= Yoruba art =

Artistic tradition of the Yoruba people

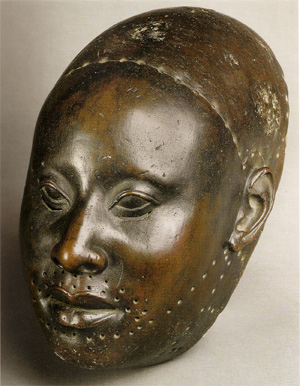
Mask for King Obalufon II; c. 1300 CE; copper; height: 29.2 cm; discovered at Ife; Ife Museum of Antiquities (Ife, Nigeria)

The Yoruba of West Africa (Benin, Nigeria and Togo) are responsible for a distinct artistic tradition in Africa, a tradition that remains vital and influential today.

Much of the art of the Yoruba, including staffs, court dress, and beadwork for crowns, is associated with the royal courts. The courts also commissioned numerous architectural objects such as veranda posts, gates, and doors that are embellished with carvings. Other Yoruba art is related shrines and masking traditions. The Yoruba worship a large pantheon of deities, and shrines dedicated to these gods are adorned with carvings and house an array of altar figures and other ritual paraphernalia. Masking traditions vary regionally, and a wide range of mask types are employed in various festivals and celebrations.

== History ==
In the period around 800CE the artists at Ife developed a refined and naturalistic sculptural tradition in terracotta, stone and copper alloy—copper, brass, and bronze— many of which appear to have been created under the patronage of King Obalufon II, the man who today is identified as the Yoruba patron deity of brass casting, weaving and regalia.

There have been a series of Yoruba kingdoms over the past nine centuries. The Ife Empire was the earliest of these; It had cultural influence over the Oyo, Owo, and Benin kingdoms, whose royal courts are said to have learned their art from Ife masters. Early art-historical and archaeological records reinforce these strong affiliations with Ife culture as far back as the 14th century.

Yoruba kingdoms prospered until the slave trade and warfare of the nineteenth century took their toll. One of the effects of this devastation was the dispersal of millions of Yoruba all over the world. This resulted in a strong Yoruba character in the artistic, religious and social lives of Africans in the New World.

=== Timeline ===
Henry Drewal, John Pemberton and Rowland Abiodun propose the following stages in the development of art in Ife:

- Archaic Era, before 800 CE
- Pre-Pavement Era, 800–1000
- Early Pavement Era, 1000–1200
- Late Pavement Era, 1200–1400
- Post-Pavement Era, 1400 – c. 1600
- Stylized Humanism Era, c. 1600 – present

== Art and life in Yoruba culture ==
The custom of art and artists among the Yoruba is deeply rooted in the Ifá literary corpus, indicating the orishas Ogun, Obatala, Oshun and Obalufon as central to creation mythology including artistry (i.e. the art of humanity).

In order to fully understand the centrality of art (onà) in Yoruba thought, one must be aware of their cosmology, which traces the origin of existence (ìwà) to a Supreme Divinity called Olódùmarè, the generator of ase, the enabling power that sustains and transforms the universe. To the Yoruba, art began when Olódùmarè commissioned the artist deity Obatala to mold the first human image from clay. Today, it is customary for the Yoruba to wish pregnant women good luck with the greeting: May Obatala fashion for us a good work of art.

The concept of ase influences how many of the Yoruba arts are composed. In the visual arts, a design may be segmented or seriate—a "discontinuous aggregate in which the units of the whole are discrete and share equal value with the other units." Such elements can be seen in Ifa trays and bowls, veranda posts, carved doors, and ancestral masks.

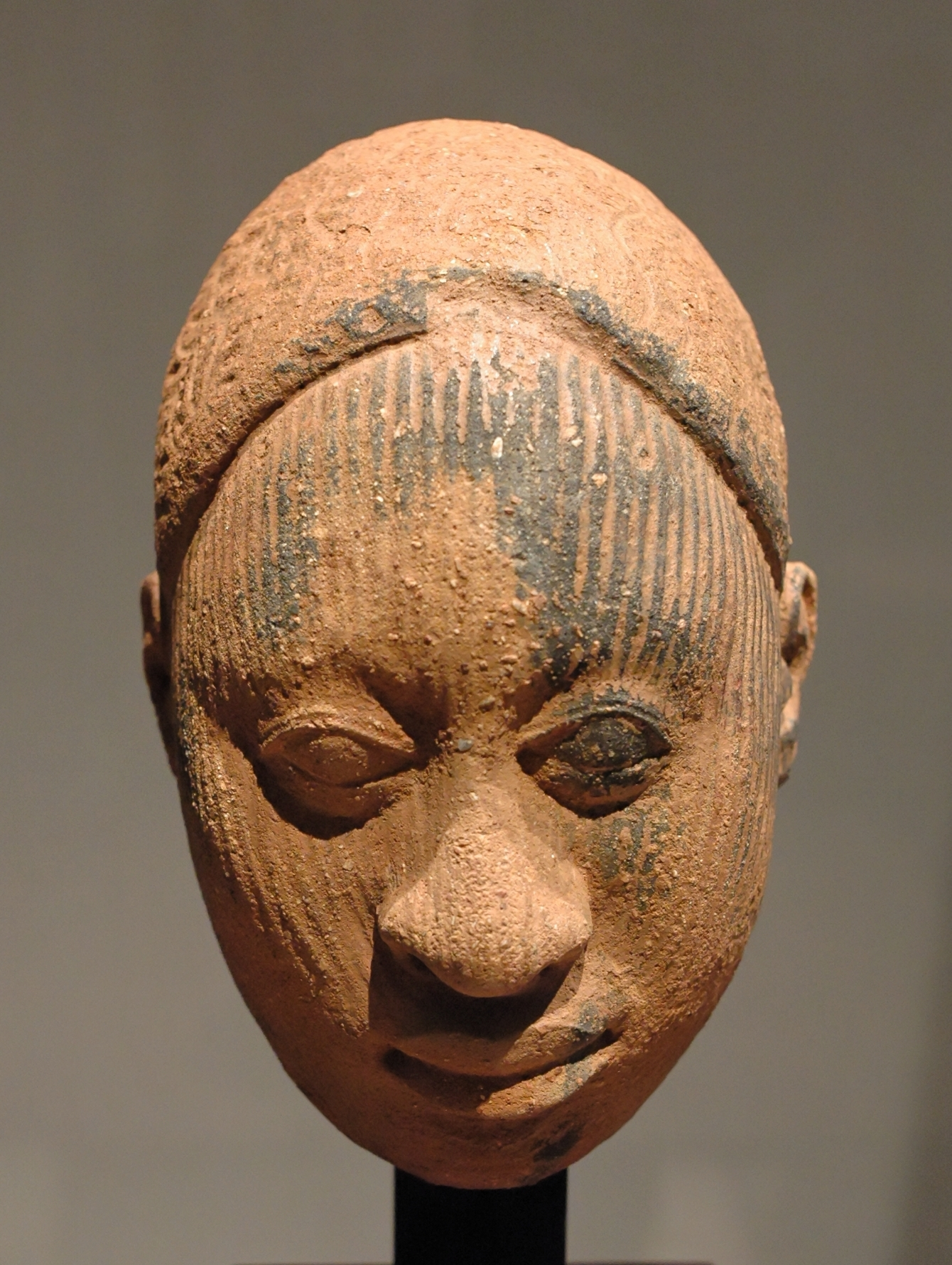
Ife head, terracotta, probably 12–14th centuries; height: 15.5 cm (6 in.)

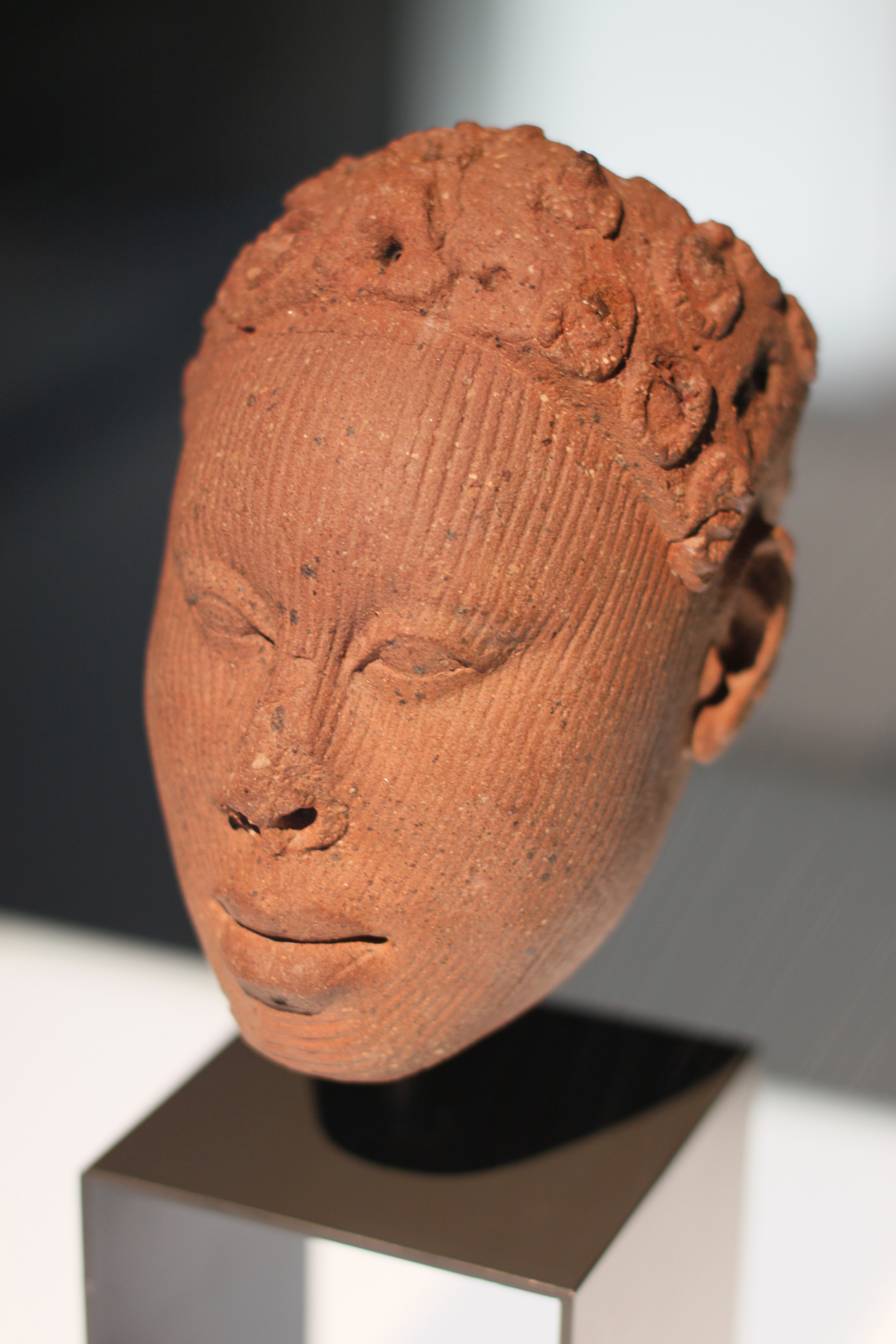
Bust of a king or dignitary; 12th–15th century AD; terracotta; Ethnological Museum of Berlin (Germany); discovered at Ife (Nigeria)

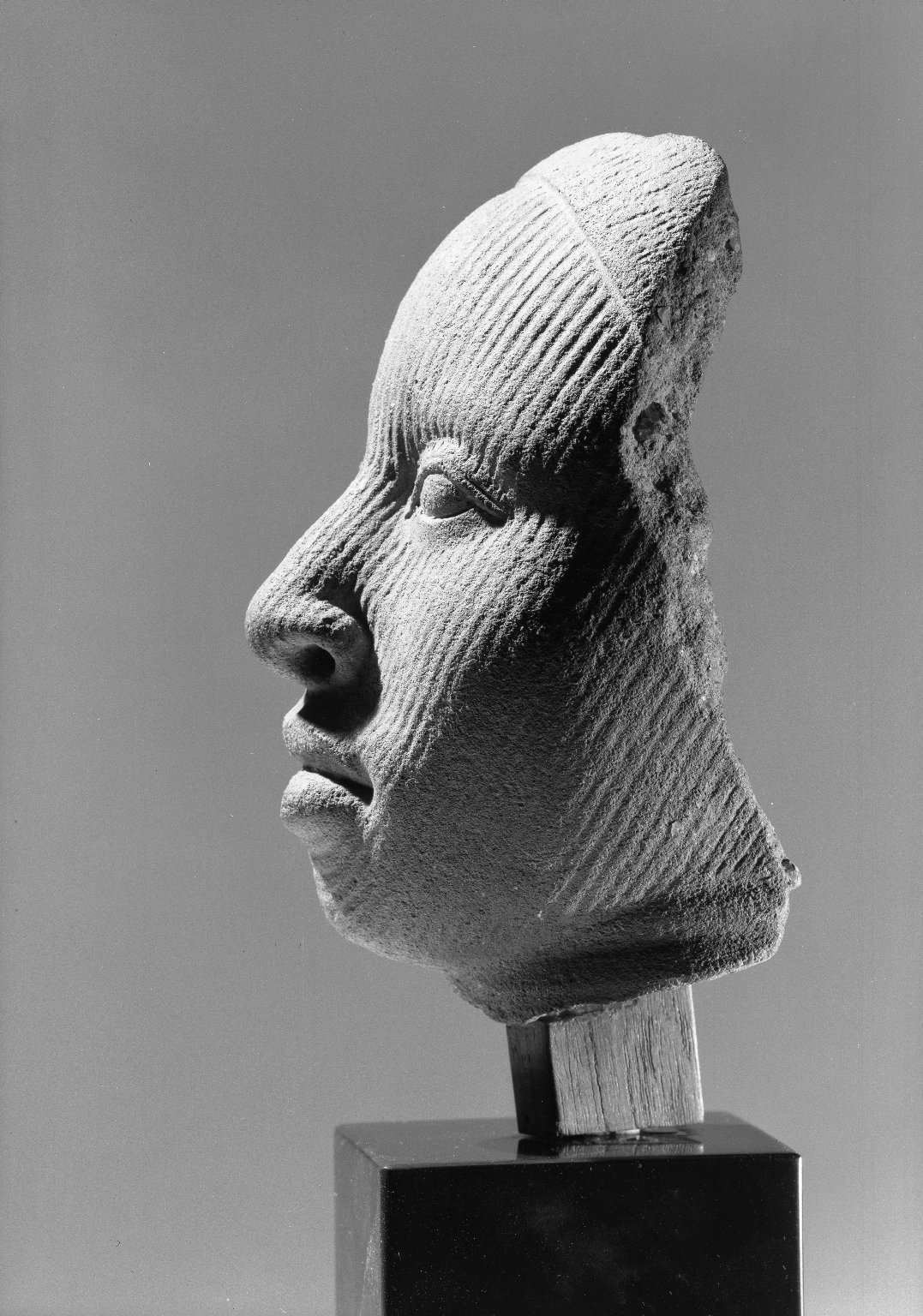
Brooklyn Museum, Fragment of an Ife Head

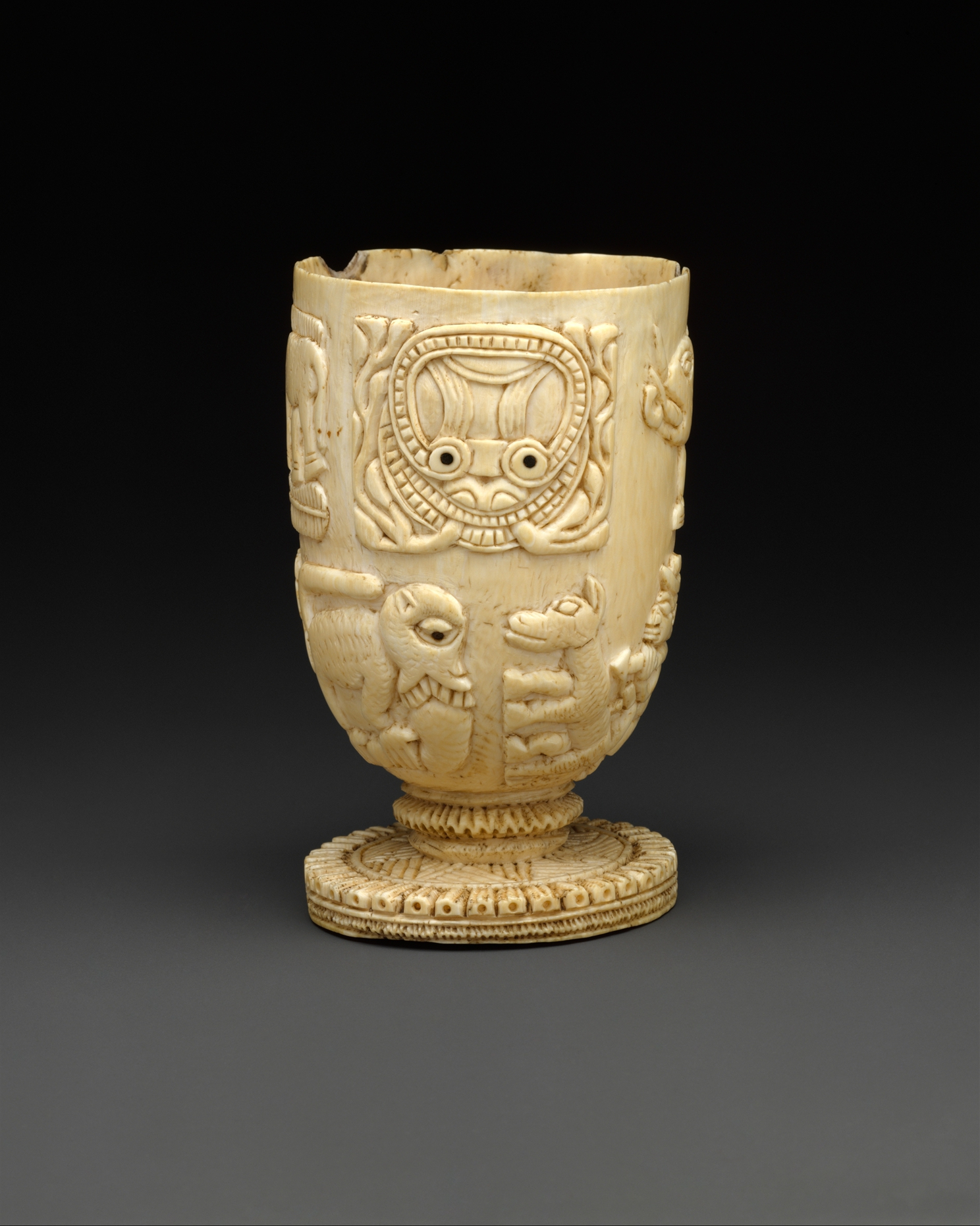
Ceremonial Ivory vessel

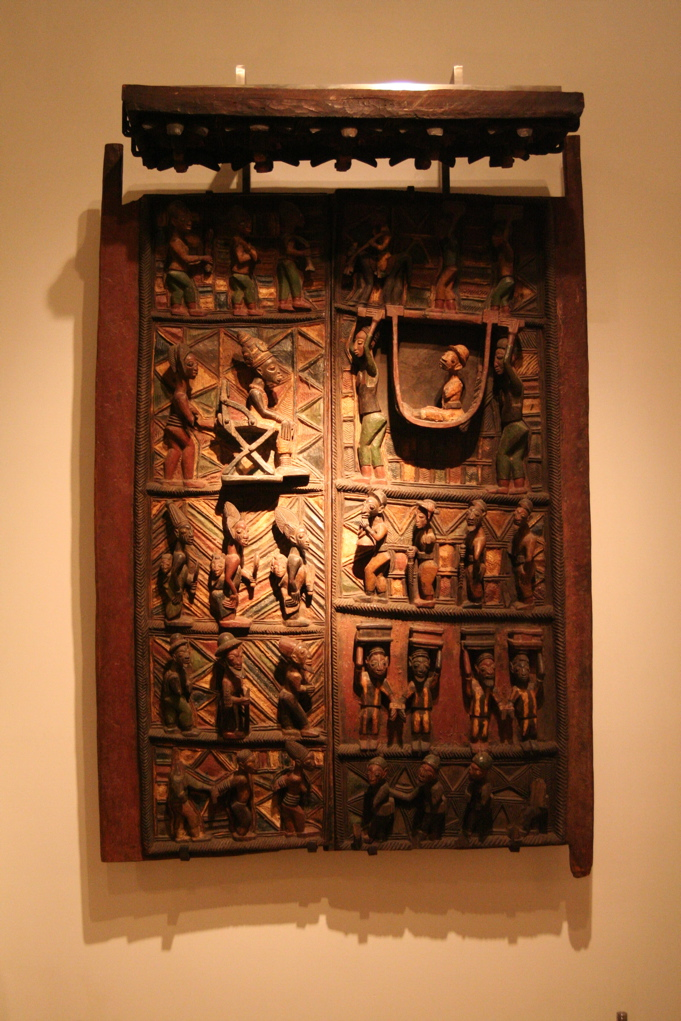
Decorated Panel Door

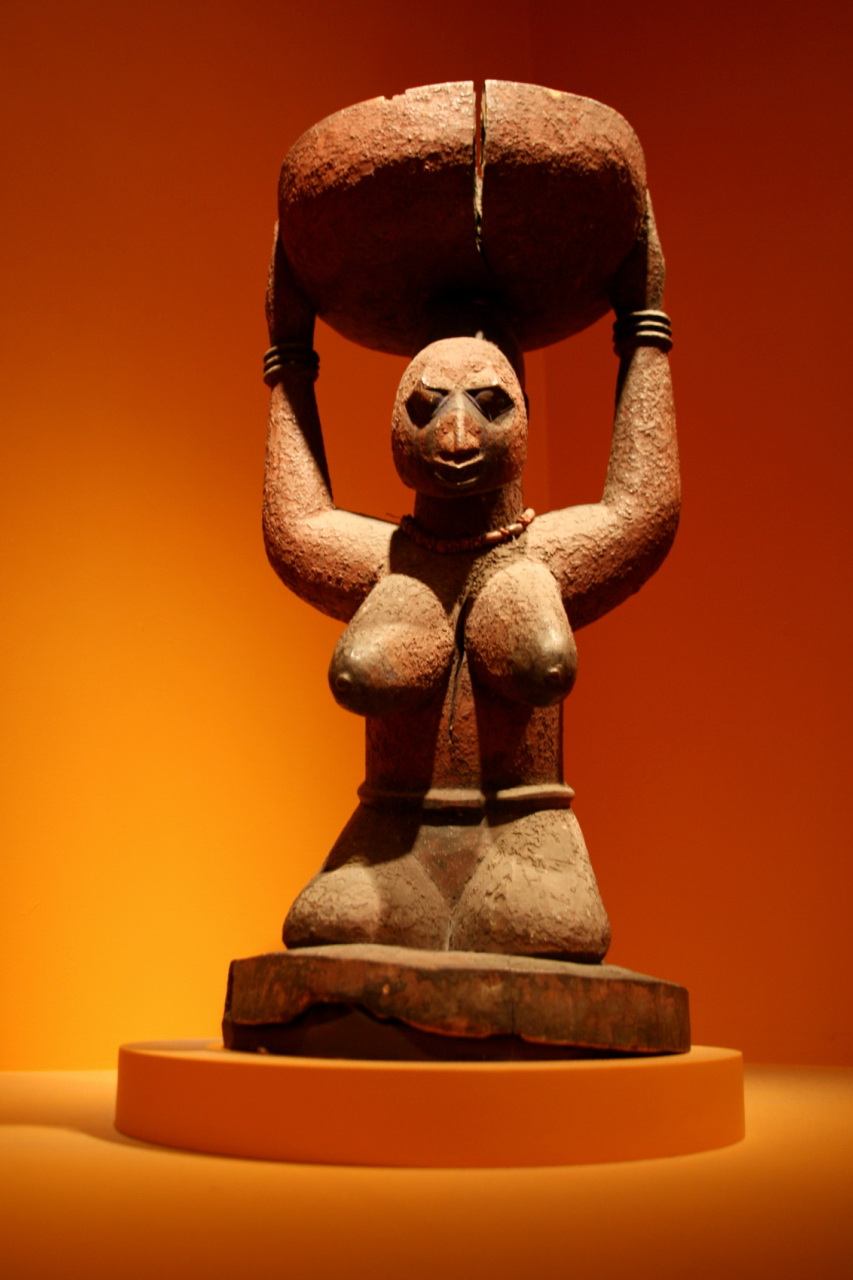
Female figure from Oke-Onigbin, Shango shrine.

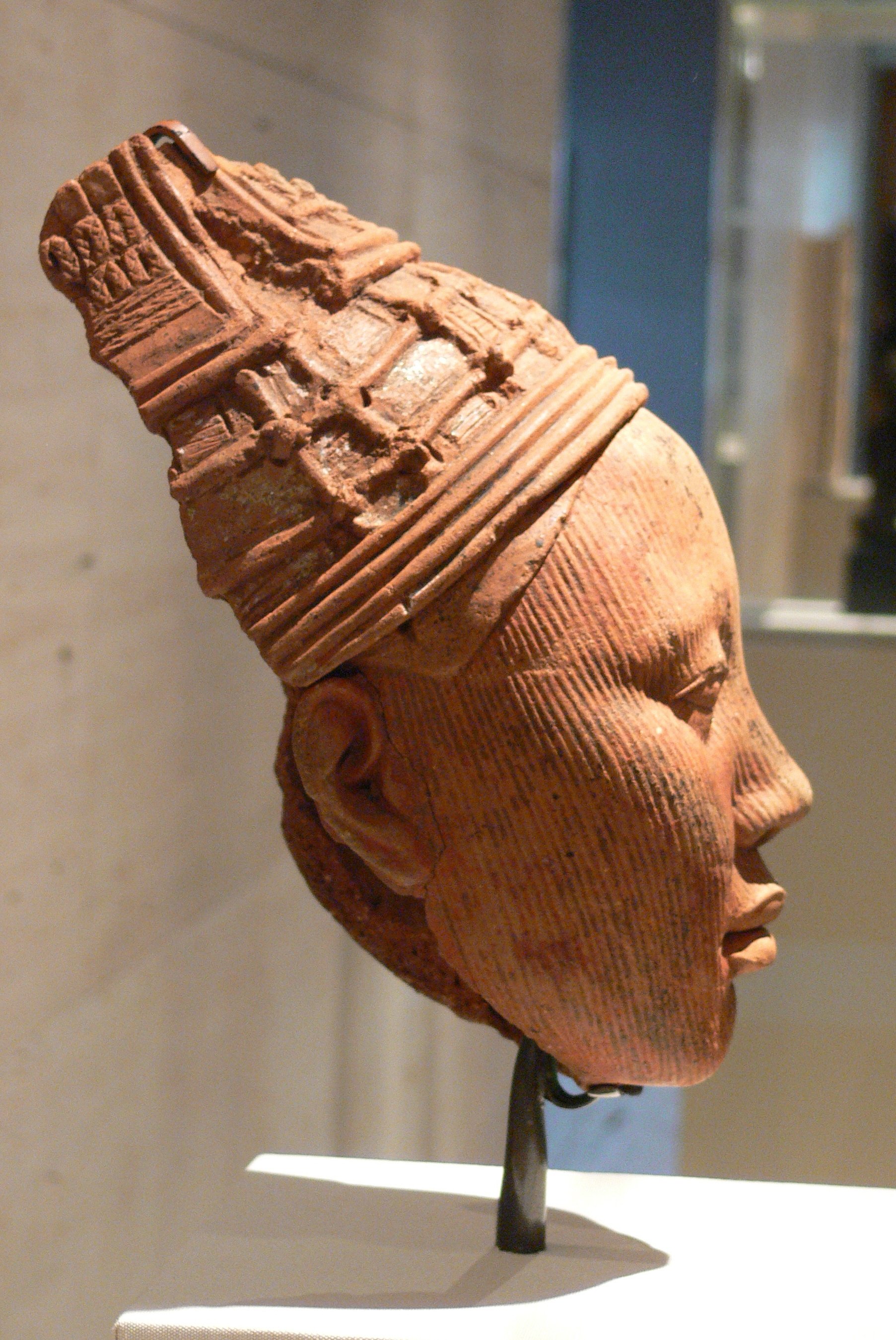
Head, probably of a king; 12th–14th century; terracotta; 26.7 × 14.5 × 18.7 cm (10.5 × 5.7 × 7.3 in.); Kimbell Art Museum (Fort Worth, Texas, USA)

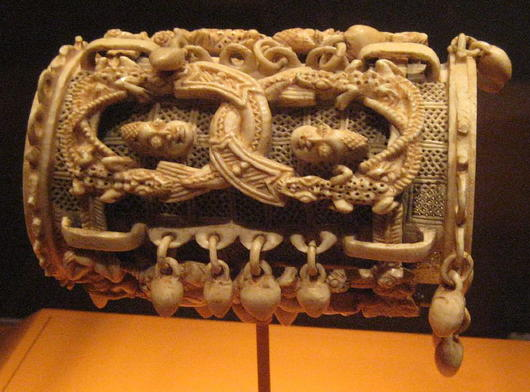
Yoruba peoples armlet (16th century)

Altar Stool, Yoruba, Art Institute of Chicago

== The importance of the Orí in Yoruba art and culture ==
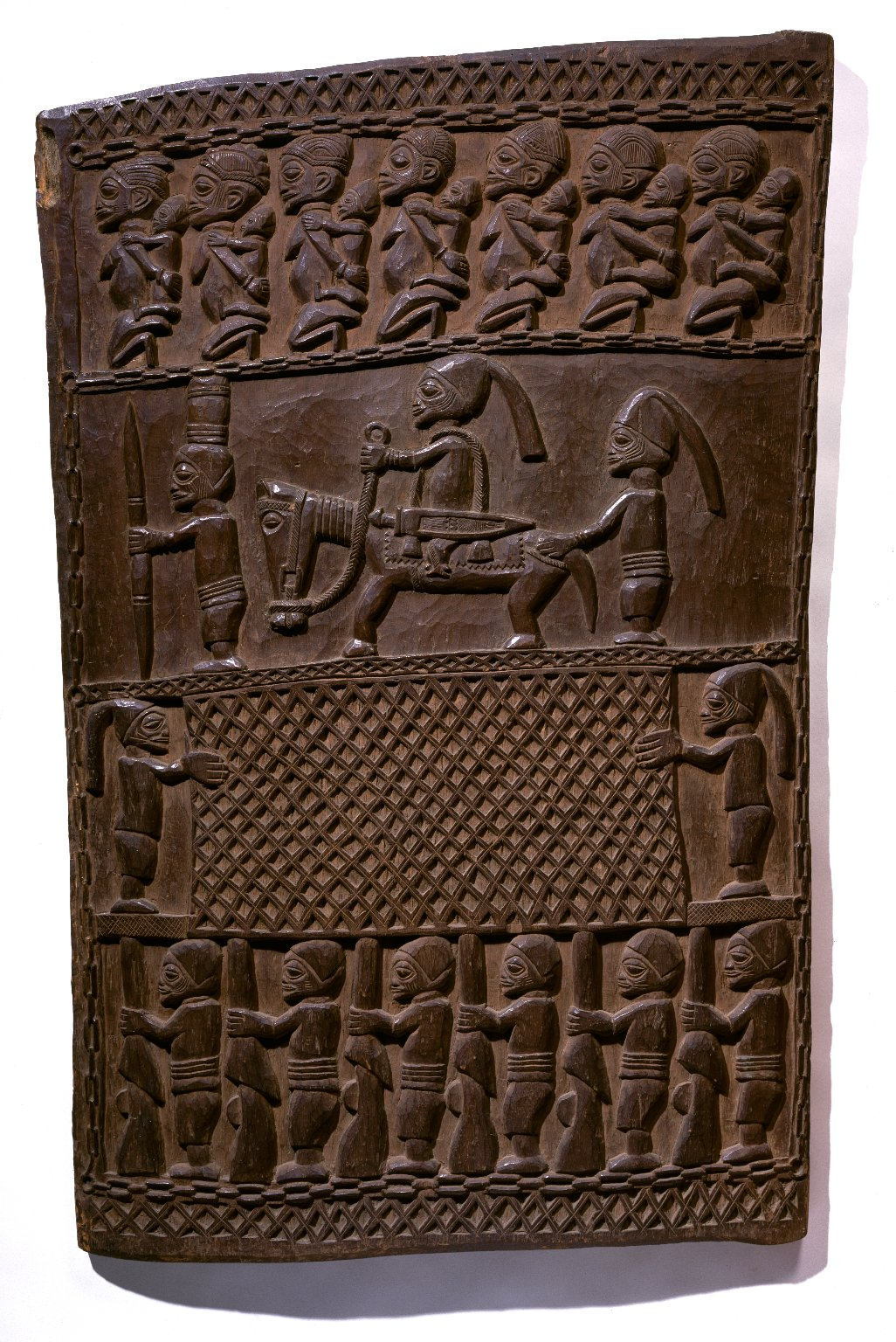
Wooden Door (Ilekun) with carved motifs

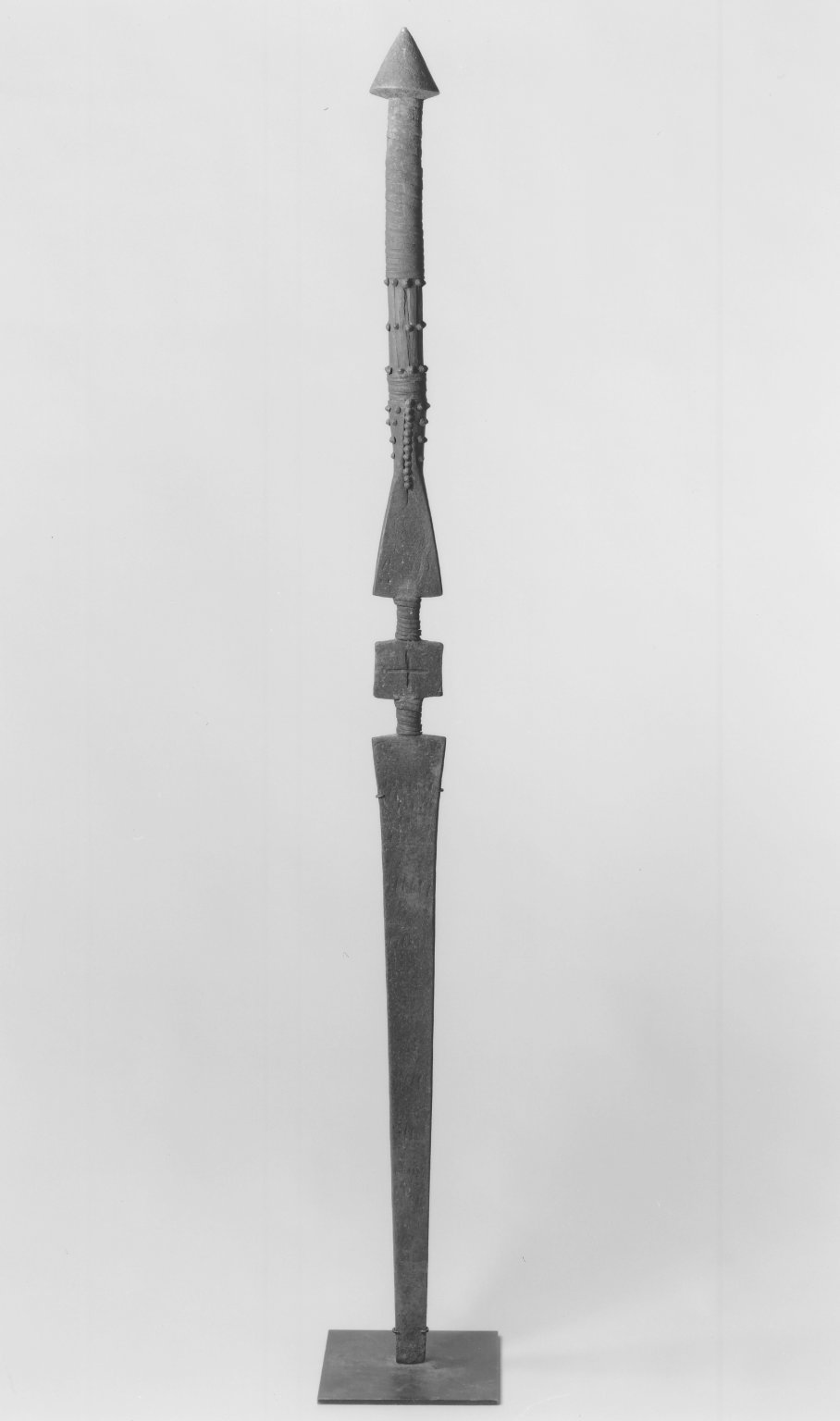
Iron and wood staff (Opa Orisha Oko); 19th century; Brooklyn Museum

The Orí-Inú, or the inner spiritual head, is very important to the Yoruba people. One's Orí-Inú is very important in terms of existing in the world. The priority goes to the Orí for any household. Thus, shrines are built in the houses. An Orí is visually represented through symbolic items within sacrifice or rituals, or more common in houses, would be terra cotta head figures. The Orí can usually determine the outcome of life for each person. Before being put into earth, each person must select their own Orí. Ajala may sometimes produce bad Orí, which this may affect the lives of those people. Sacrifices and rites happen as well in order to satisfy Orí-Isese, which is the supreme ruler over all Orí. The primary functions for sacrifices are to ward off evil and bring in good fortune and happiness.

== Anonymity and authorship in African art ==
The issue of anonymity and authorship has long troubled the field of African art history, particularly as it relates to the political disparities between Africa and the West. Such information was, at least initially, rarely sought in the field and deemed unnecessary and even undesirable by many collectors. Susan Mullin Vogel has identified a further paradox. "[I]n their own societies," she writes, "African artists are known and even famous, but their names are rarely preserved in connection with specific works. ... More often than not, the African sculptor becomes virtually irrelevant to the life of the art object once his work is complete. ... Cultures preserve the information they value."

The problem of anonymity in Yoruba art in particular is troubling in the context of Yoruba culture where "it is absolutely imperative for individuals to acknowledge each other's identity and presence from moment to moment, [and where] there is a special greeting for every occasion and each time of day."

Several Yoruba artists' names are known, including:

- Bangboshe of Osi Ilorin
- Bandele Areogun of Osi
- Master of Ikare
- Lamidi Fakeye
- Olowe of Ise

== Metal arts ==
Yoruba blacksmiths create sculpture from iron, through hand-beating, welding, and casting. Ogun is honored as the god of iron.

Metalworkers also create brass sculptures by lost-wax casting. Brass is seen as being incorruptible by the Ogboni society.

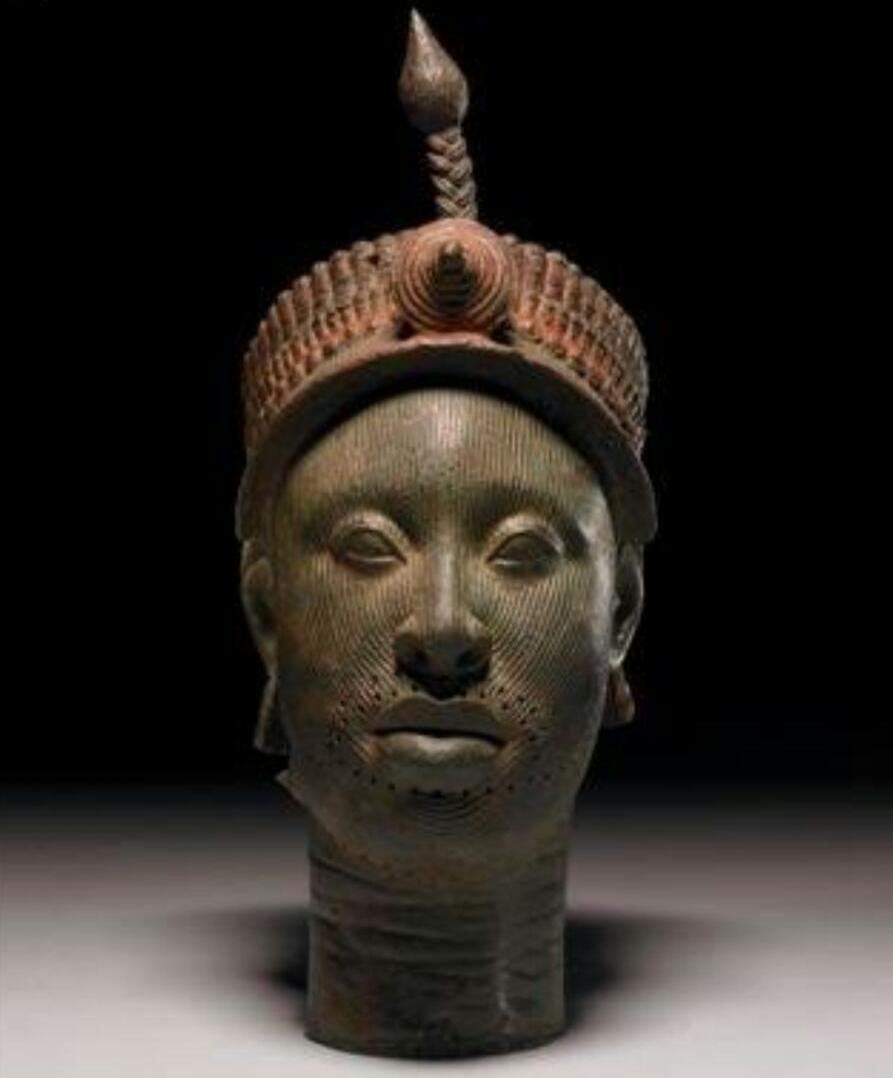
Bronze head from Ife; 12th-15th century; brass; British Museum (London)

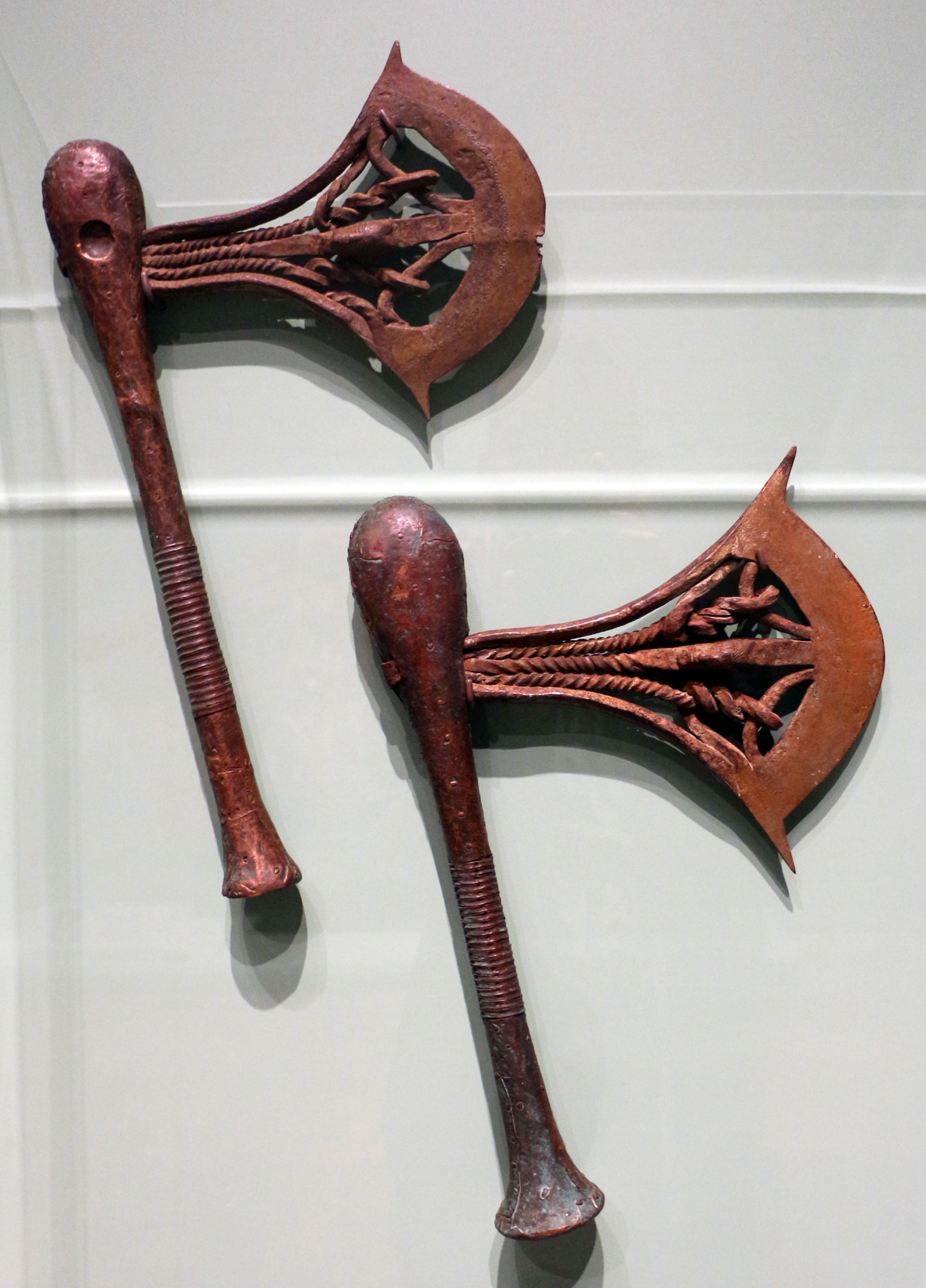
Ceremonial axes; 18th century; from Owo (Ondo state, Nigeria); Speed Art Museum (Louisville, Kentucky, USA)

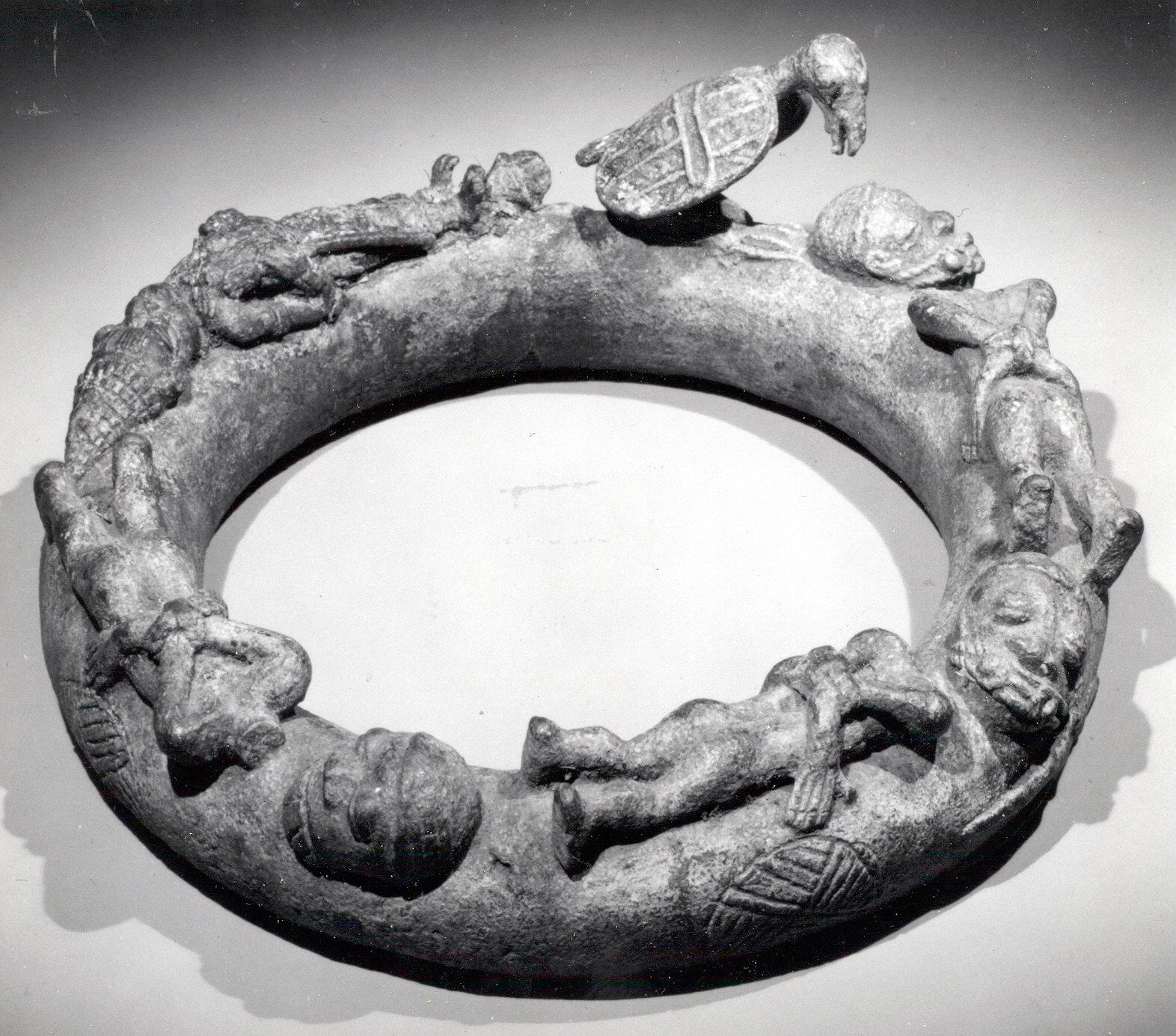
Ife altar ring,16th century, Brass or Copper alloy

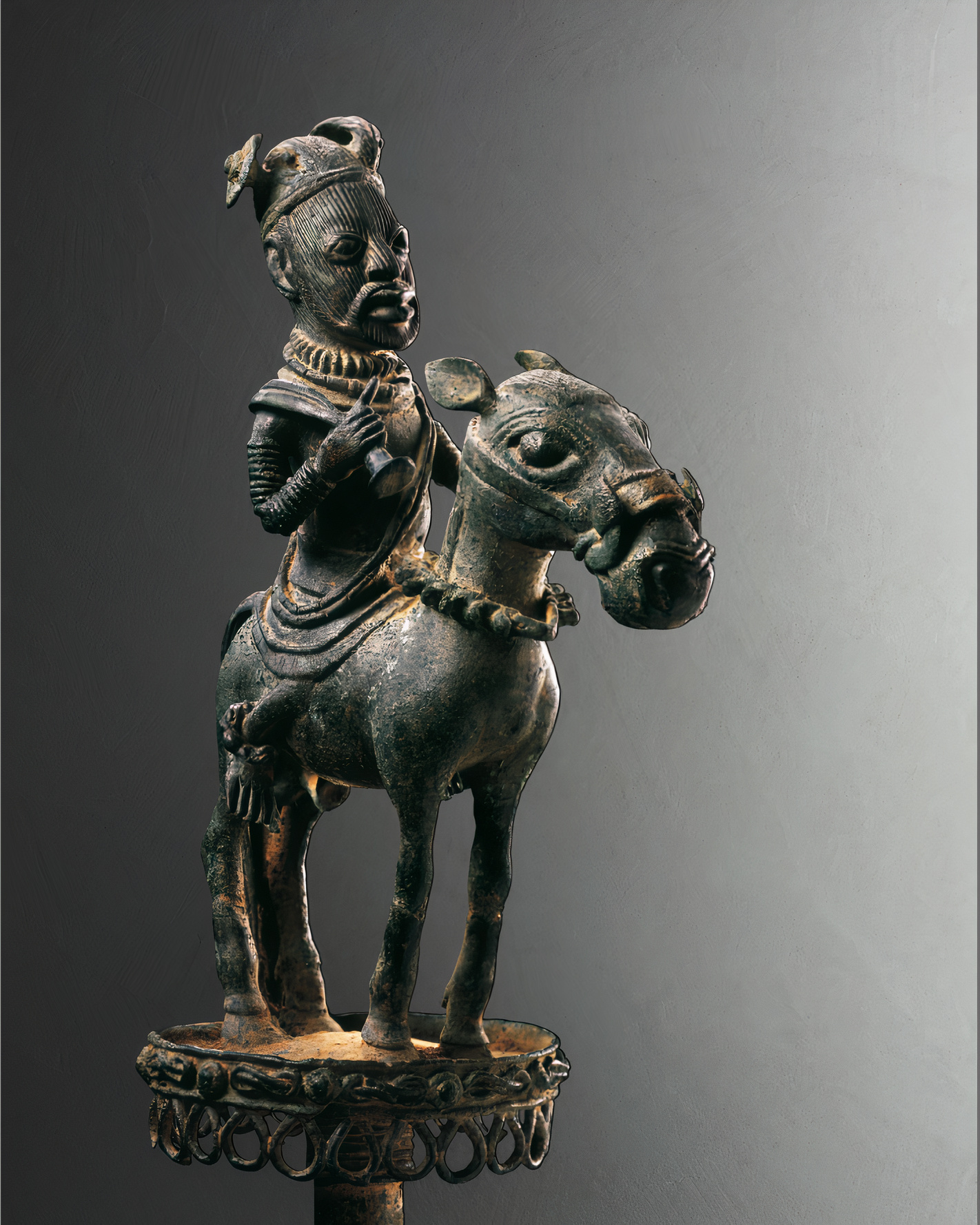
Copper alloy sceptre with horse-riding figure of a king or high-ranking noble of Ife, 12th –13th century CE. The vertical facial striation marks that typify early ife art is evident

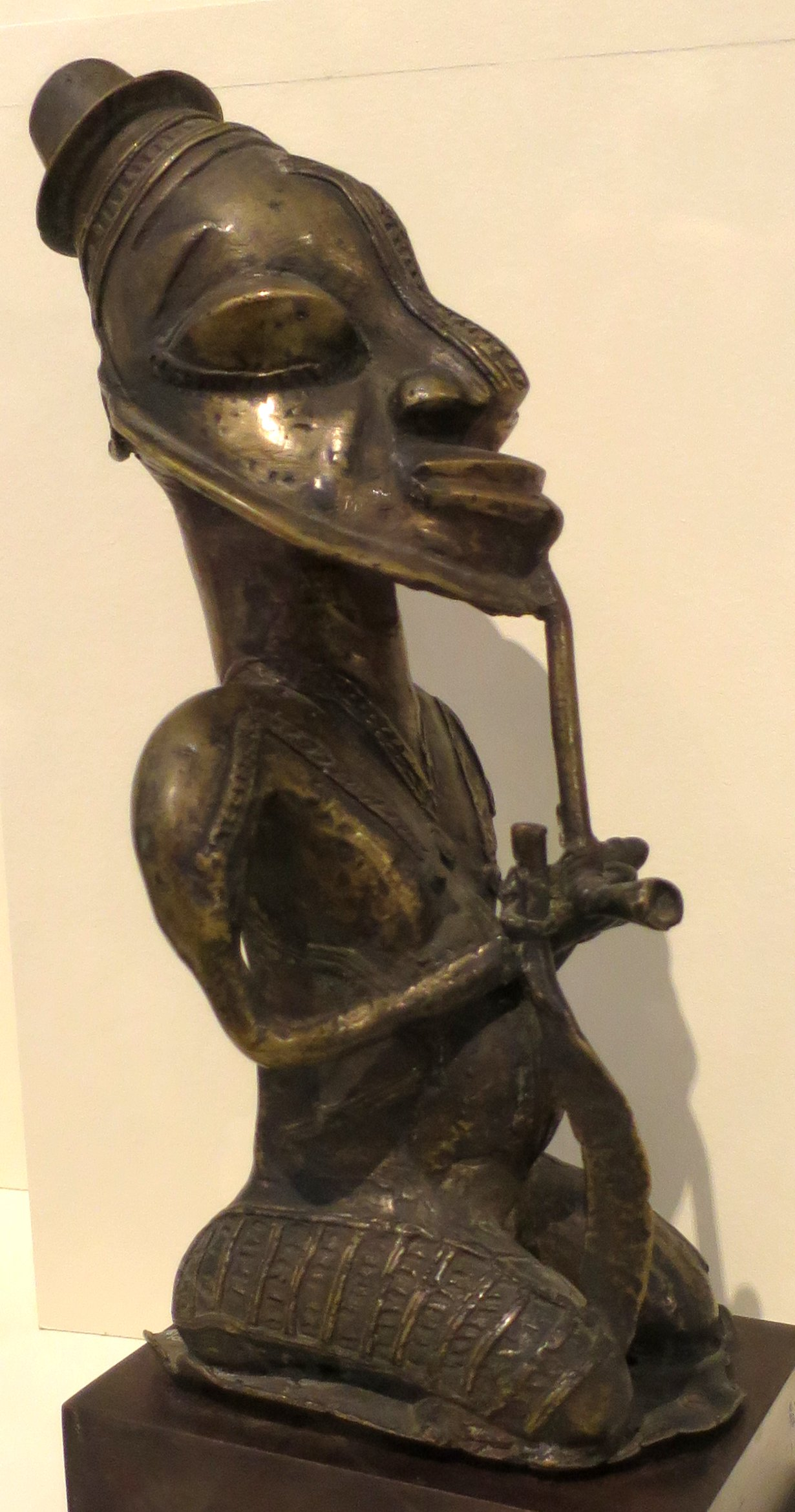
Male figure (Onile); late 19th-early 20th century; cast bronze; Honolulu Museum of Art (Hawaii, USA)

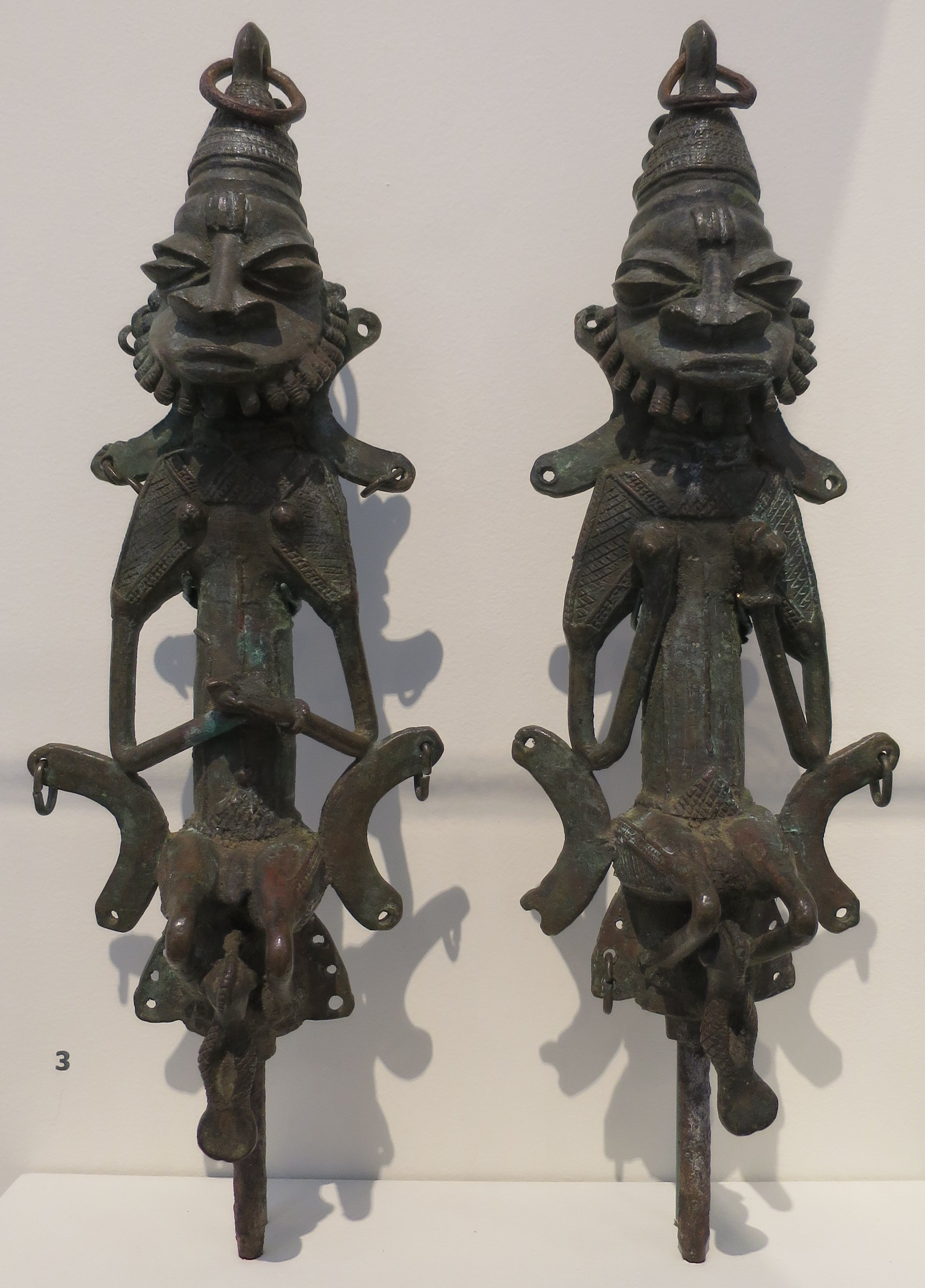
Pair of staffs (Edan Ogboni), male and female couple; 19th century; cast bronze and iron; Honolulu Museum of Art

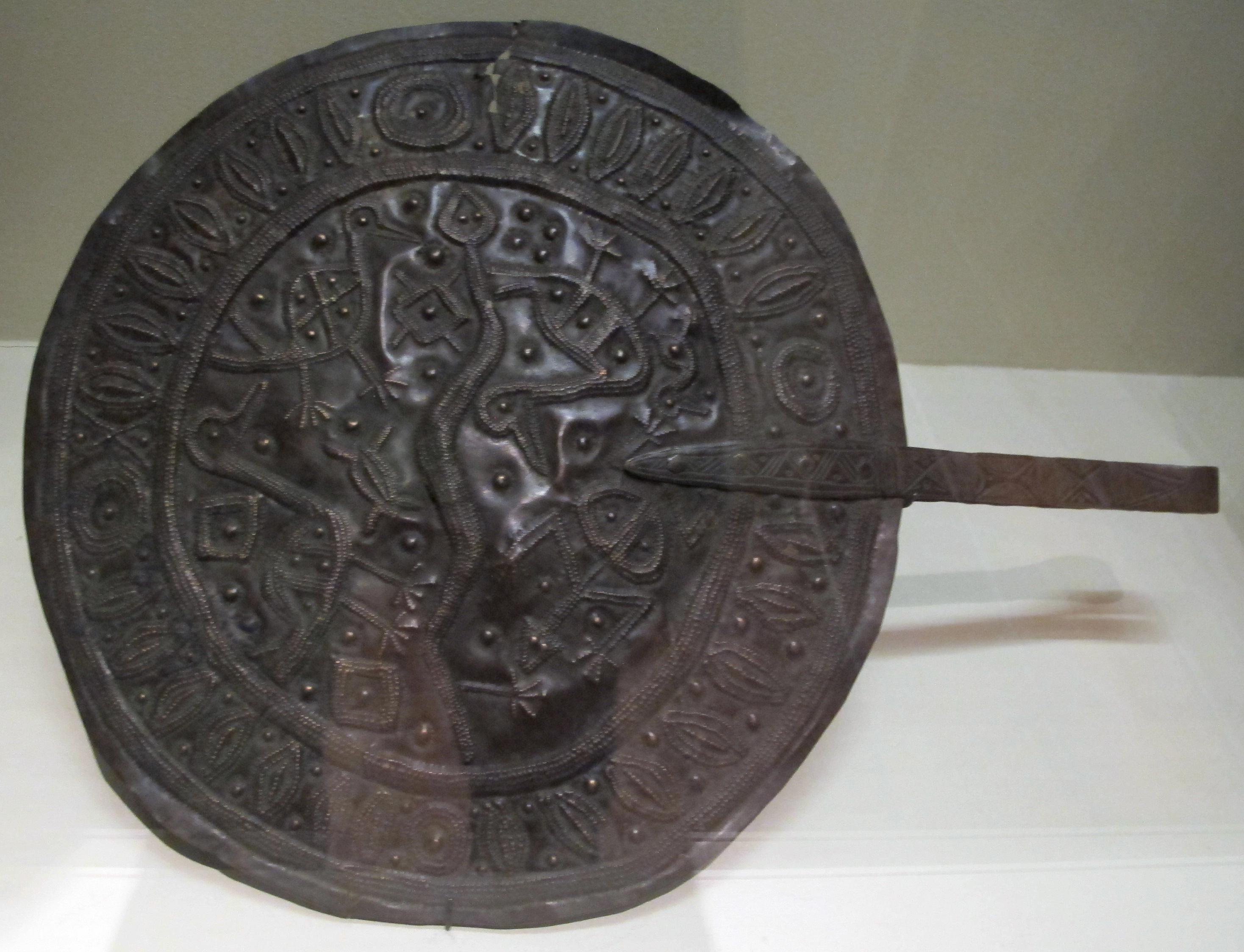
Brass fan (Abebe), one of the ritual objects associated with the Yoruba goddess, Osun

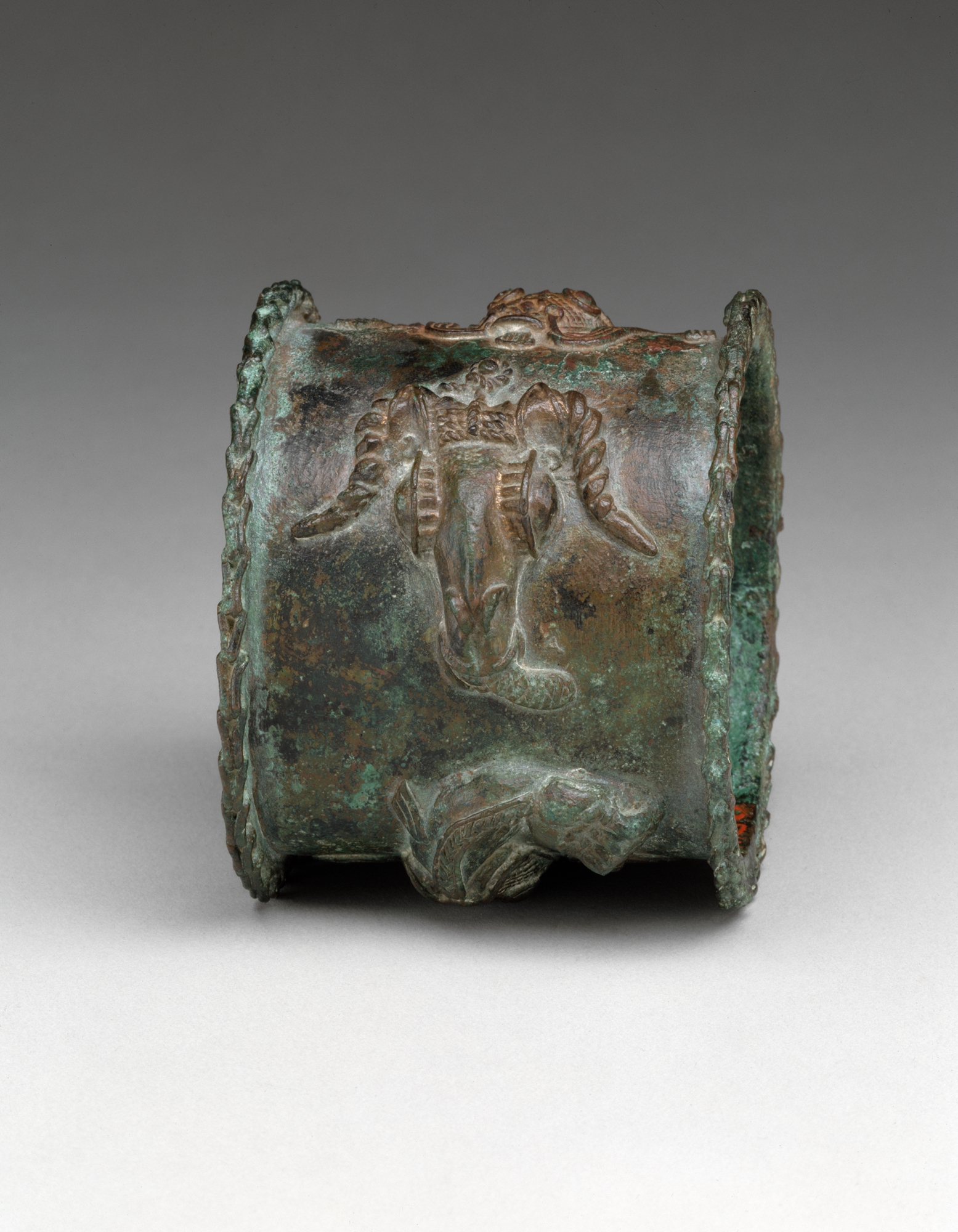
Ijebu brass bracelet depicting a ram head, 18th century

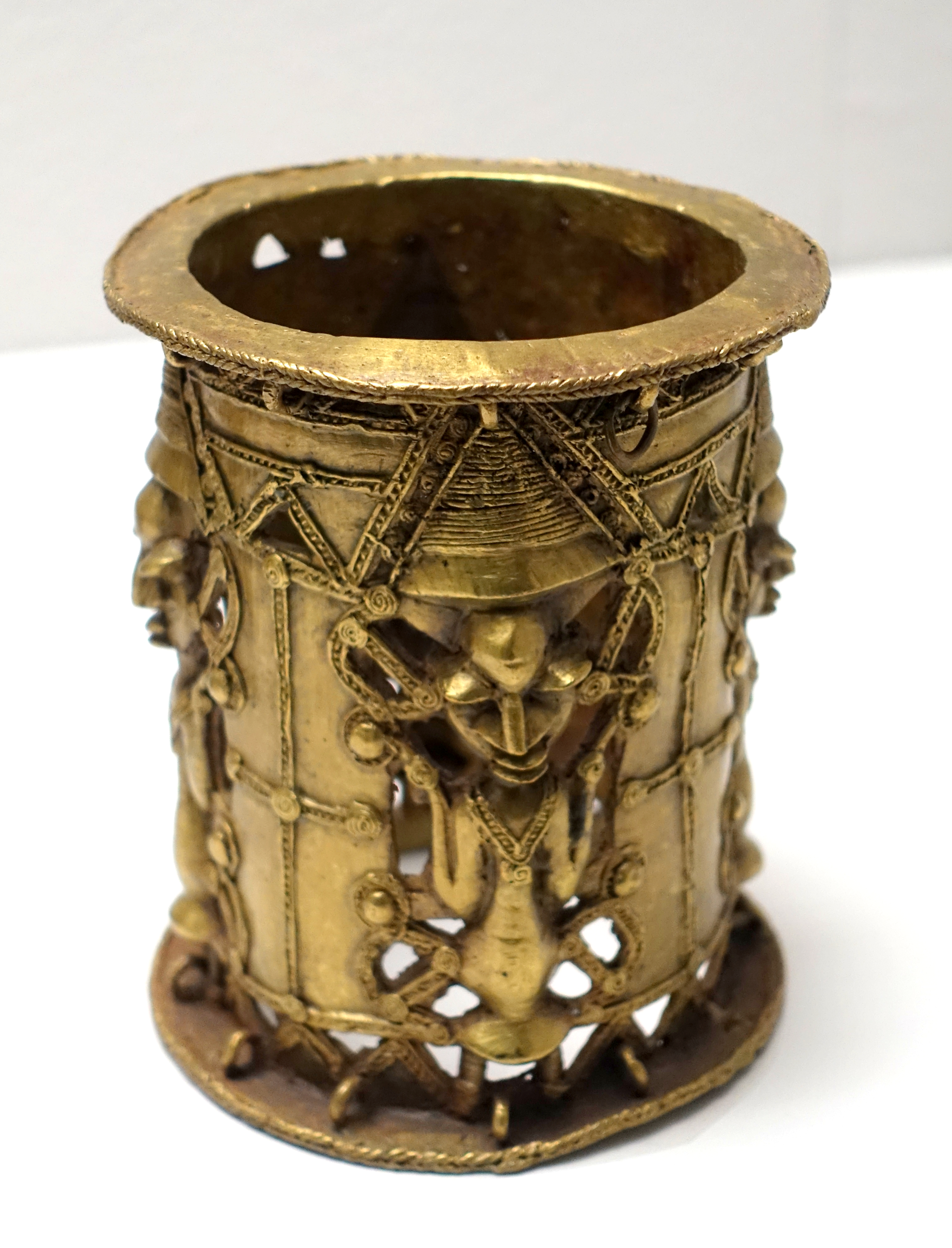
Brass arm band or vessel stand, Ijebu, Yoruba, 19th century

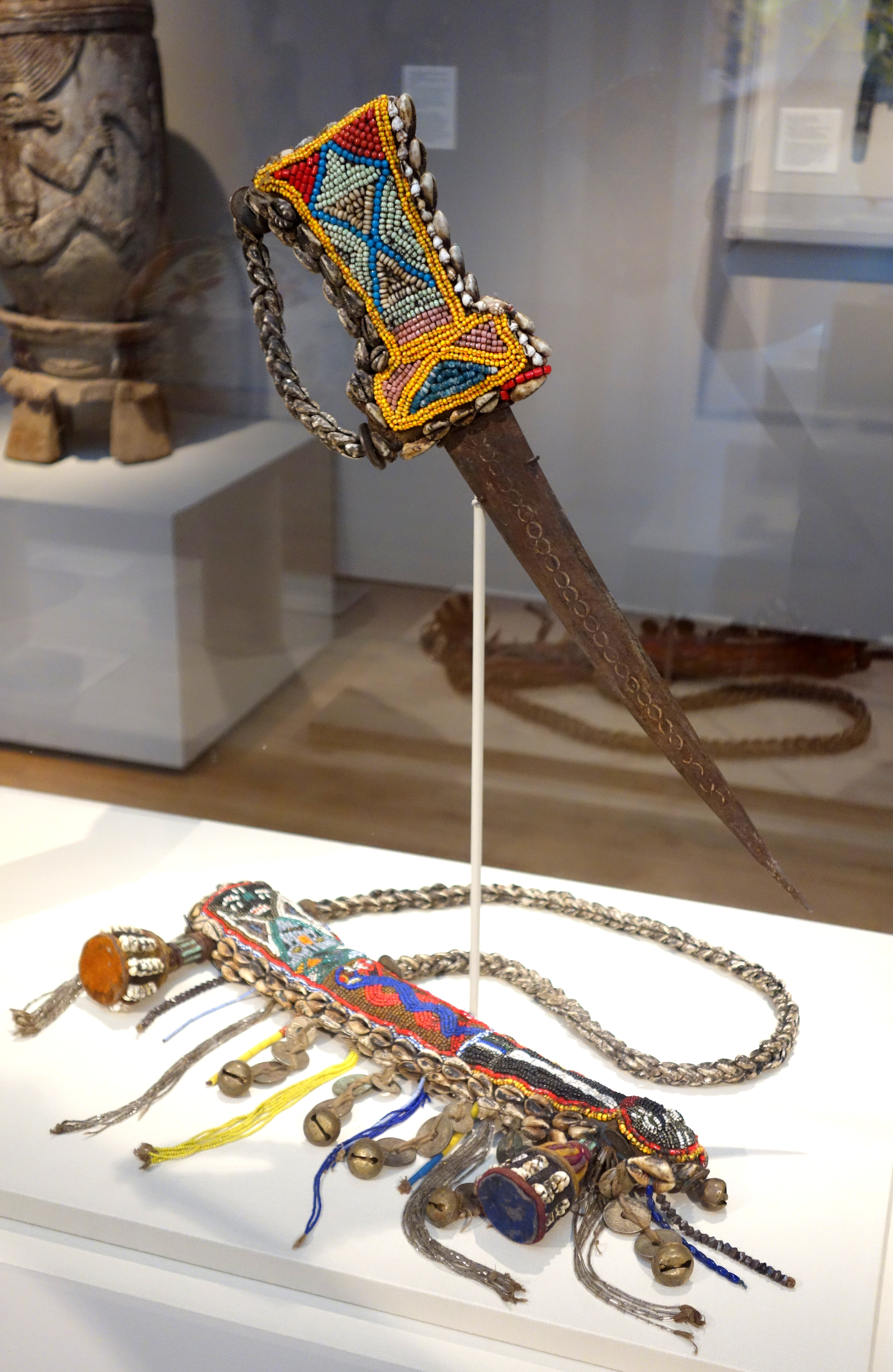
Beaded sword and Sheath, Nigeria, Yoruba people; beads, metal, fabric, coins, brass, cowry shells, leather – Chazen Museum of Art

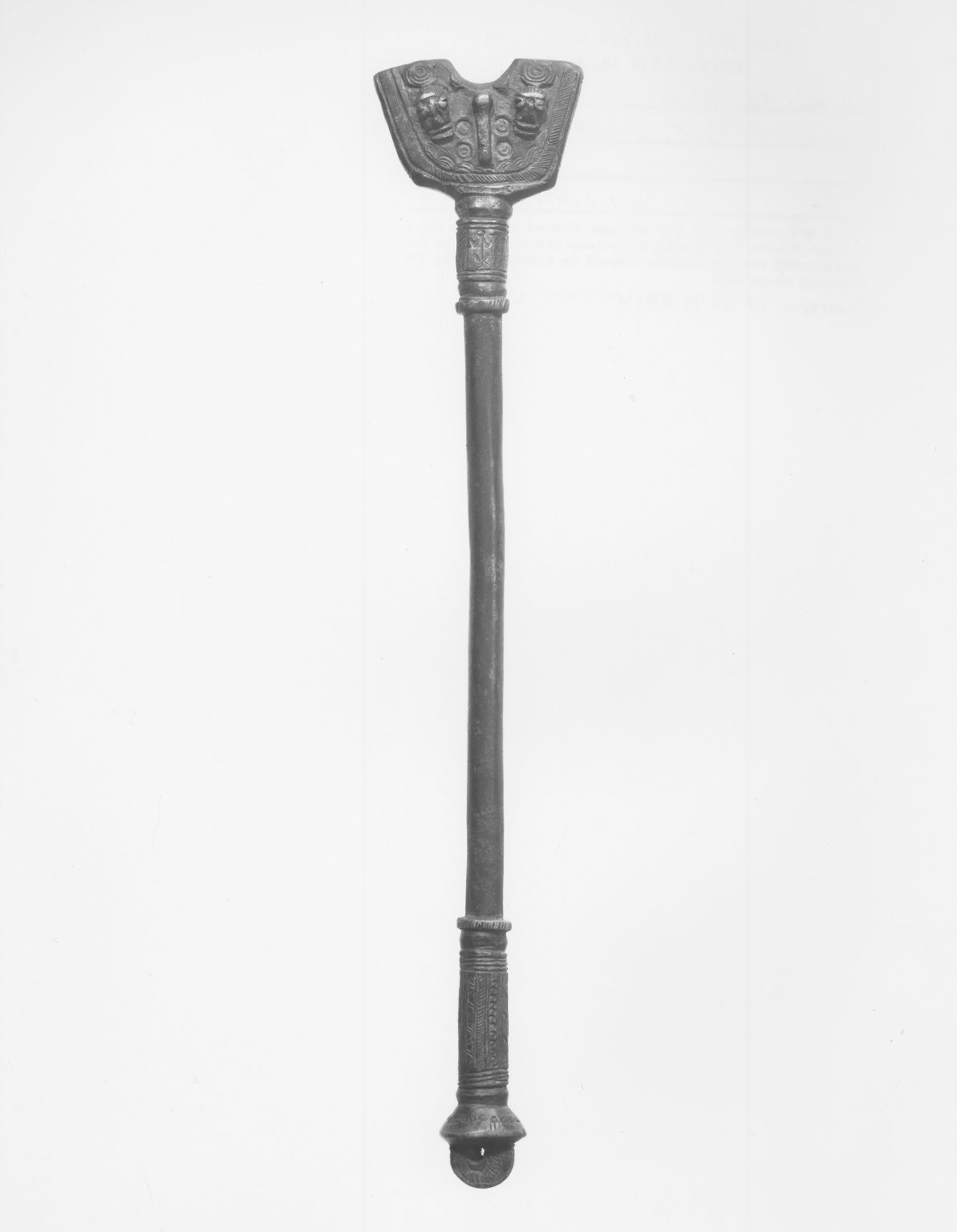
Shango ceremonial staff, 19th century, Brooklyn Museum

== Ivory and wood ==
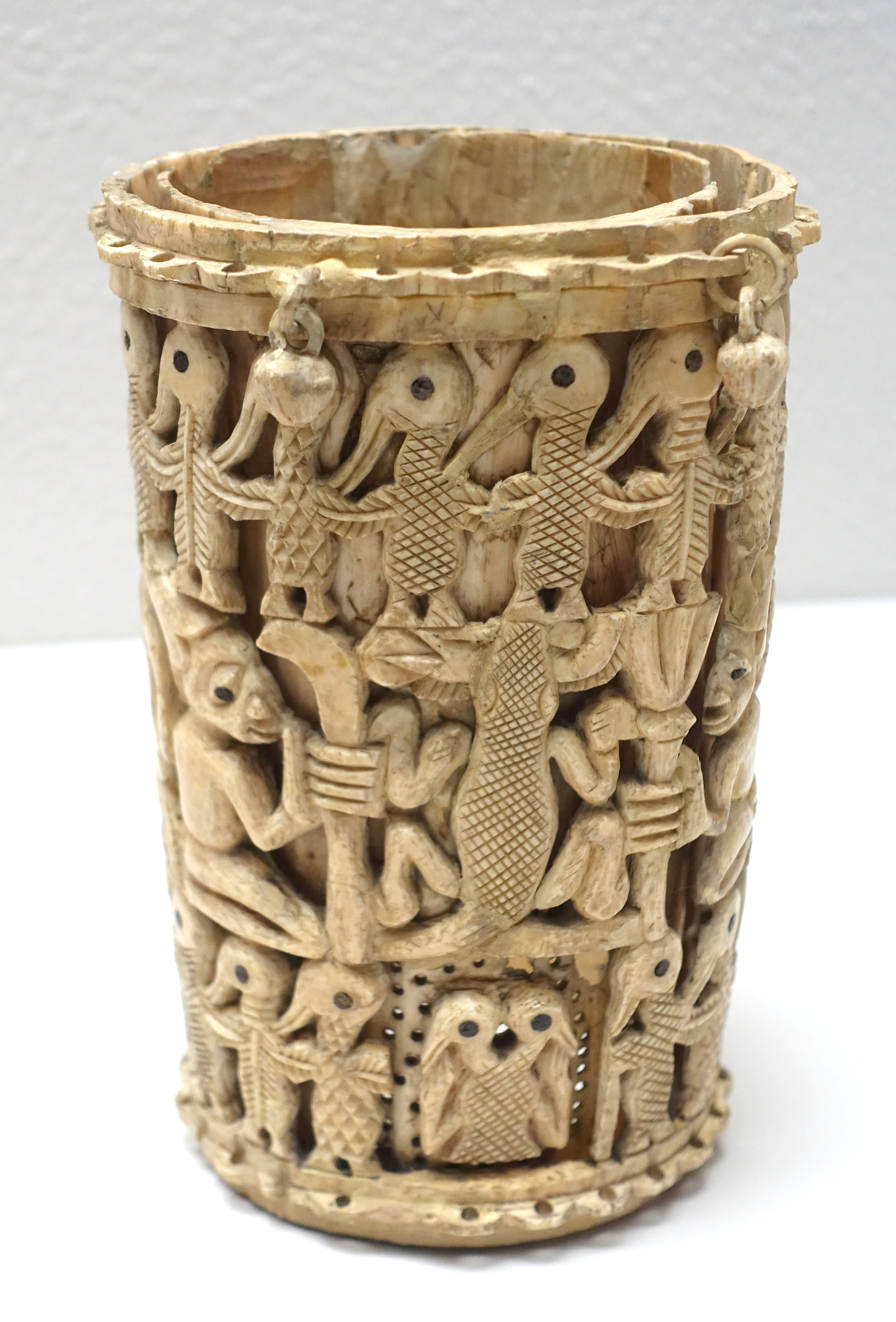
Arm band, Owo, Yoruba, 18th century AD, ivory – Ethnological Museum, Berlin

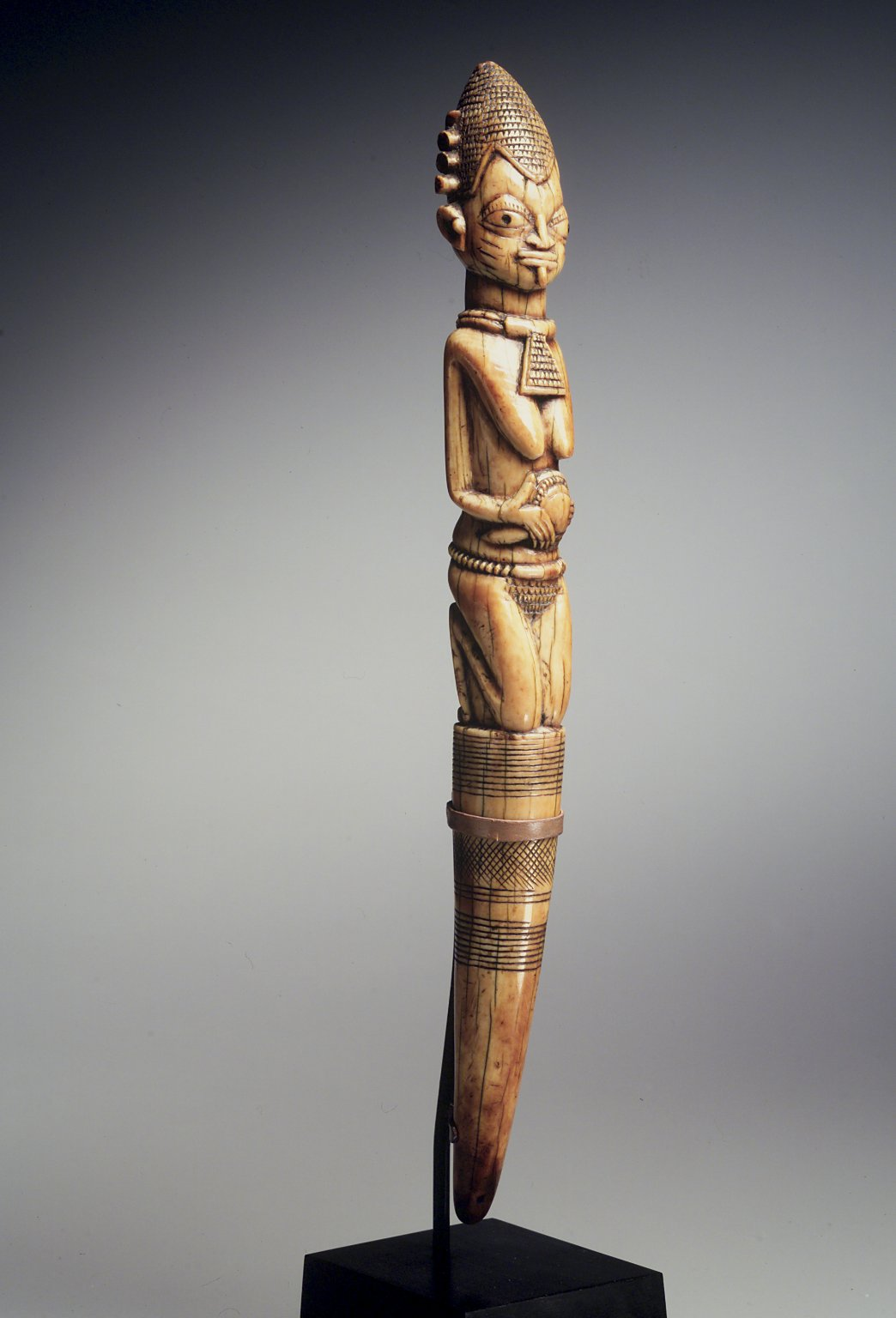
18th century ivory divination tapper (iroke ifa) from the Owo region. Brooklyn Museum

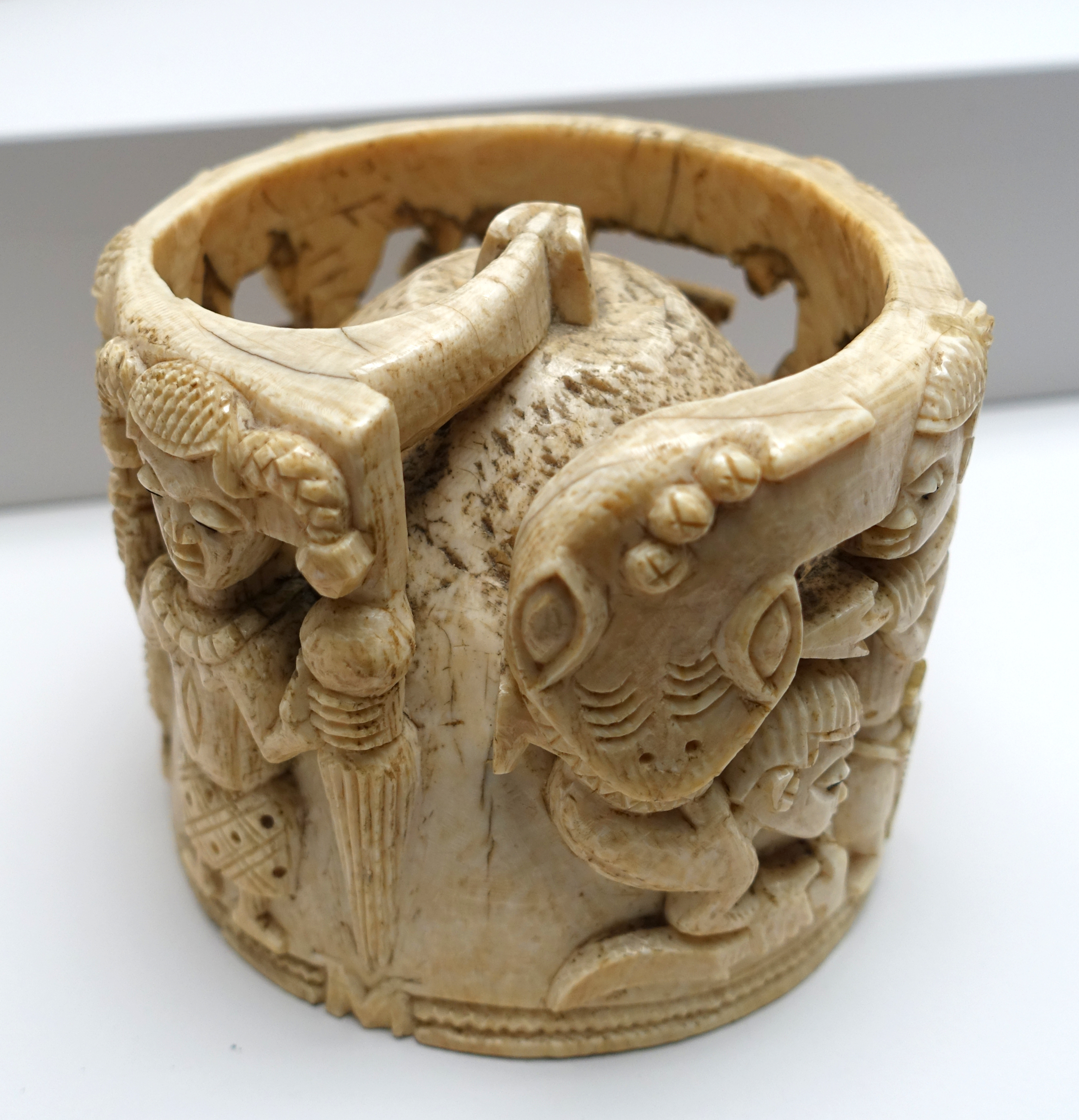
Ivory vessel cover, Owo, Yoruba, (1700s)18th Century

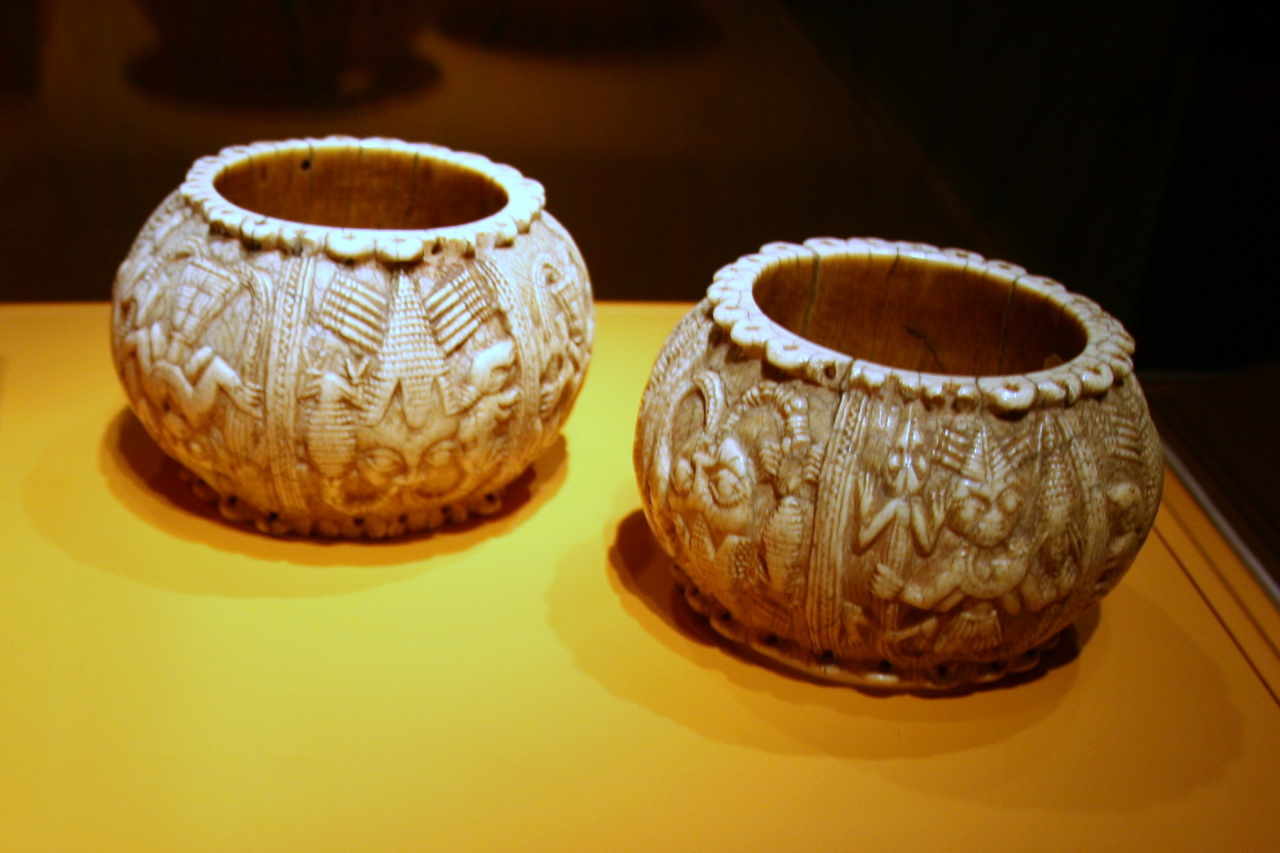
Ivory armlets, Yoruba peoples, Owo region of Yorubaland, 16th century. This particular pair may have been part of the Olowo's ceremonial attire

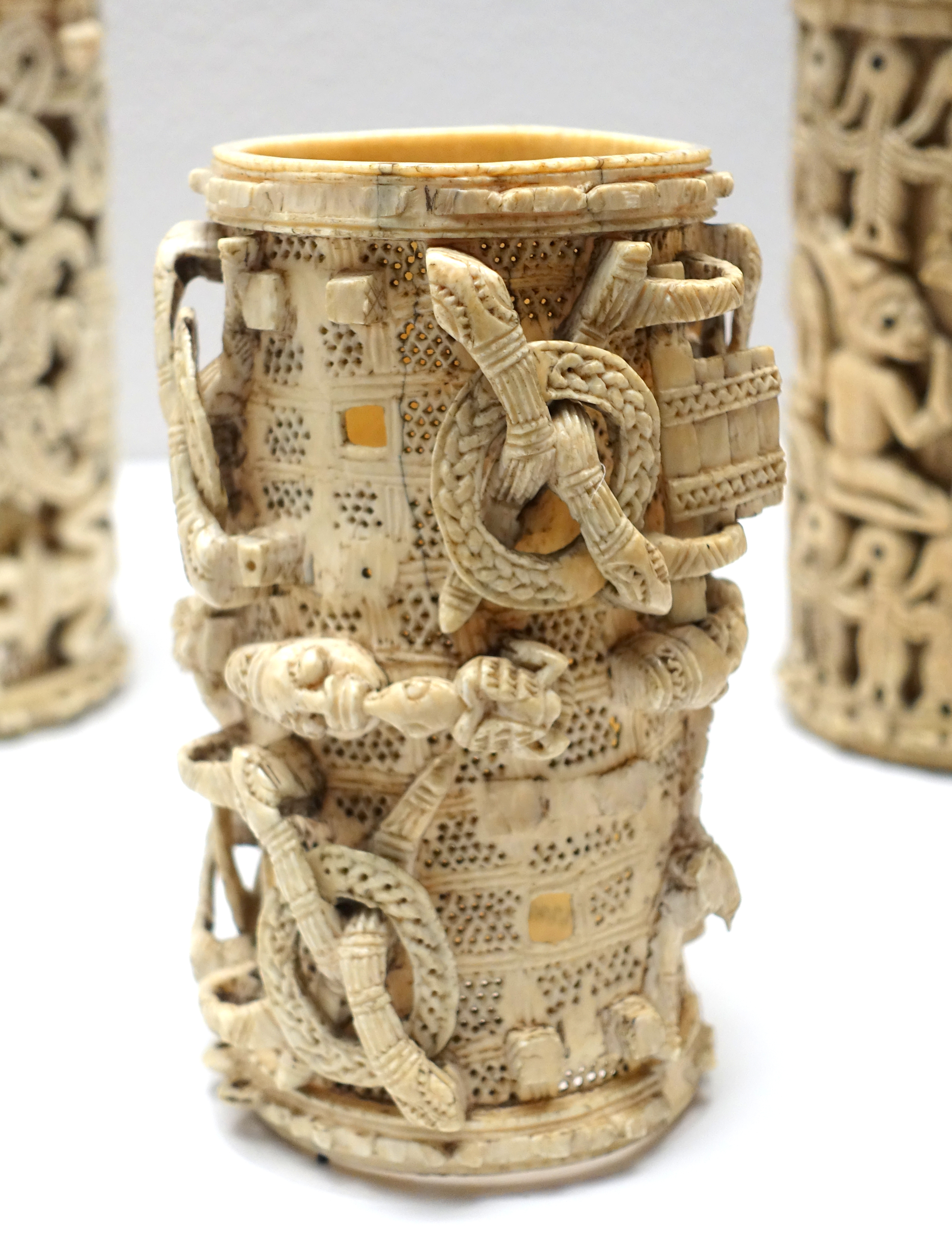
Ceremonial arm band from Owo 18th century AD, ivory – Ethnological Museum, Berlin

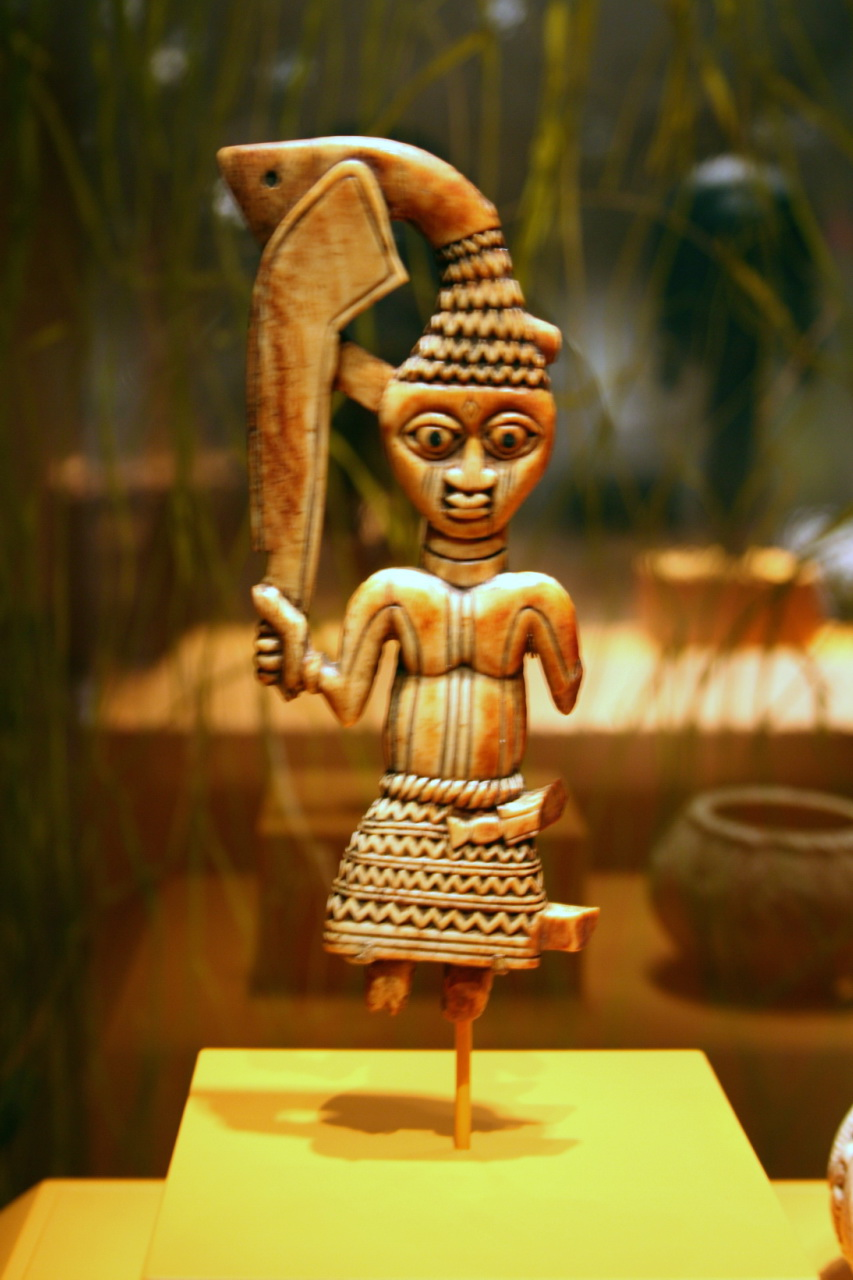
Ceremonial ivory sword fragment, Udamaloore, Owo,19th century

== Terracotta ==
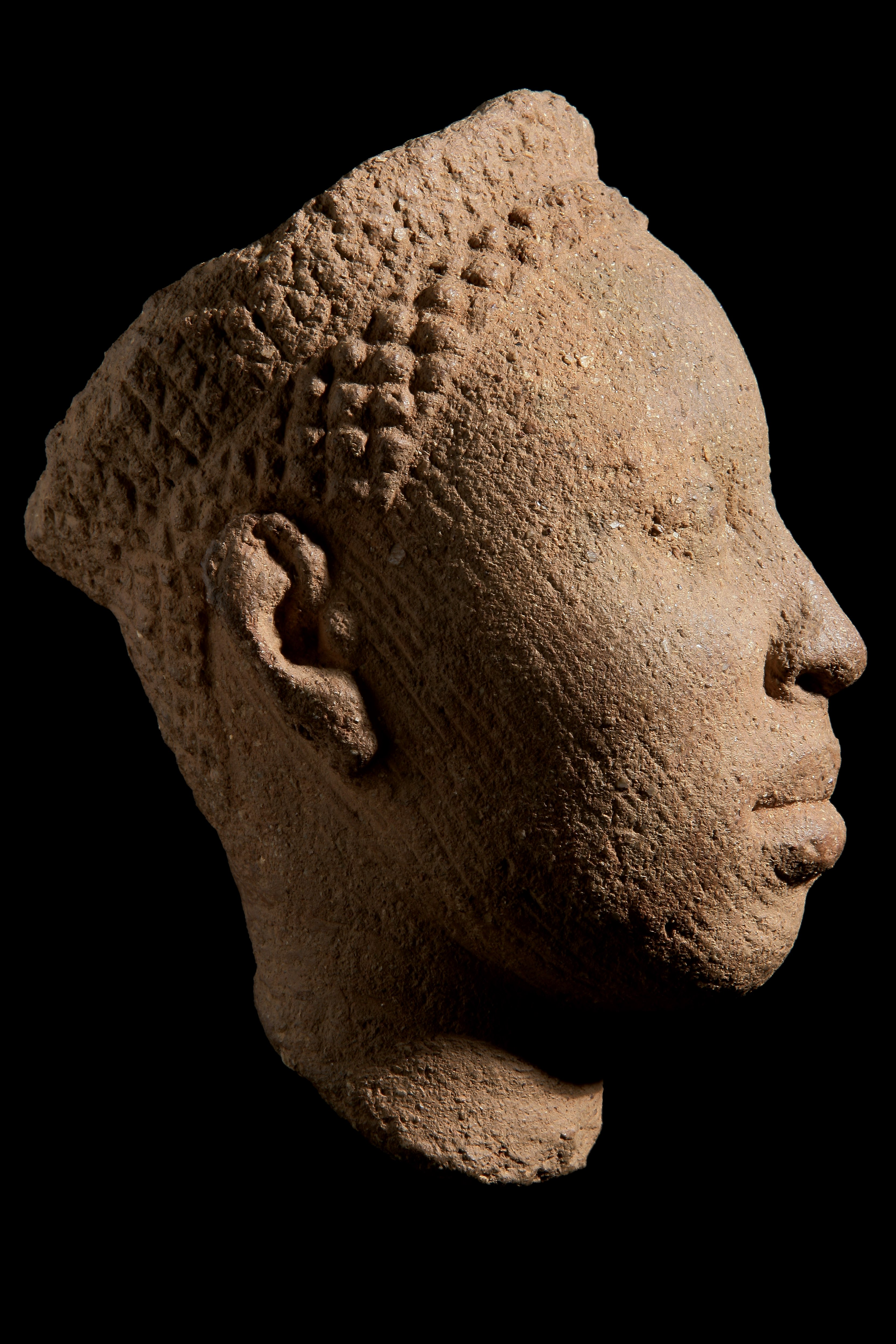
Ife terracotta head dating to the 14th century. Heads (Orí) are a very prominent aspect of early Ife artistic forms

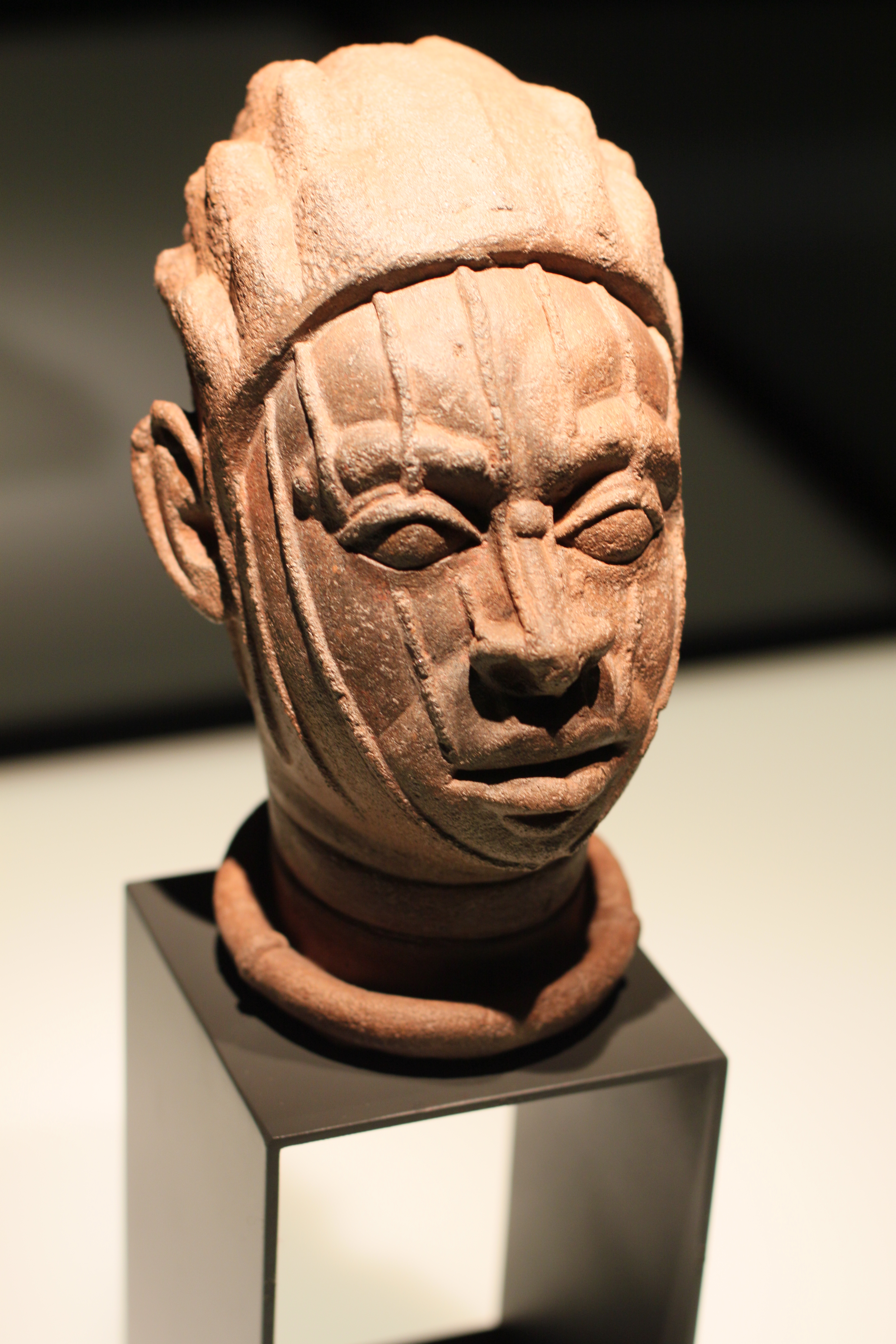
Memorial head with vertical facial striations typical of ife heads, Nigeria, 12th century AD, terracotta – Ethnological Museum, Berlin

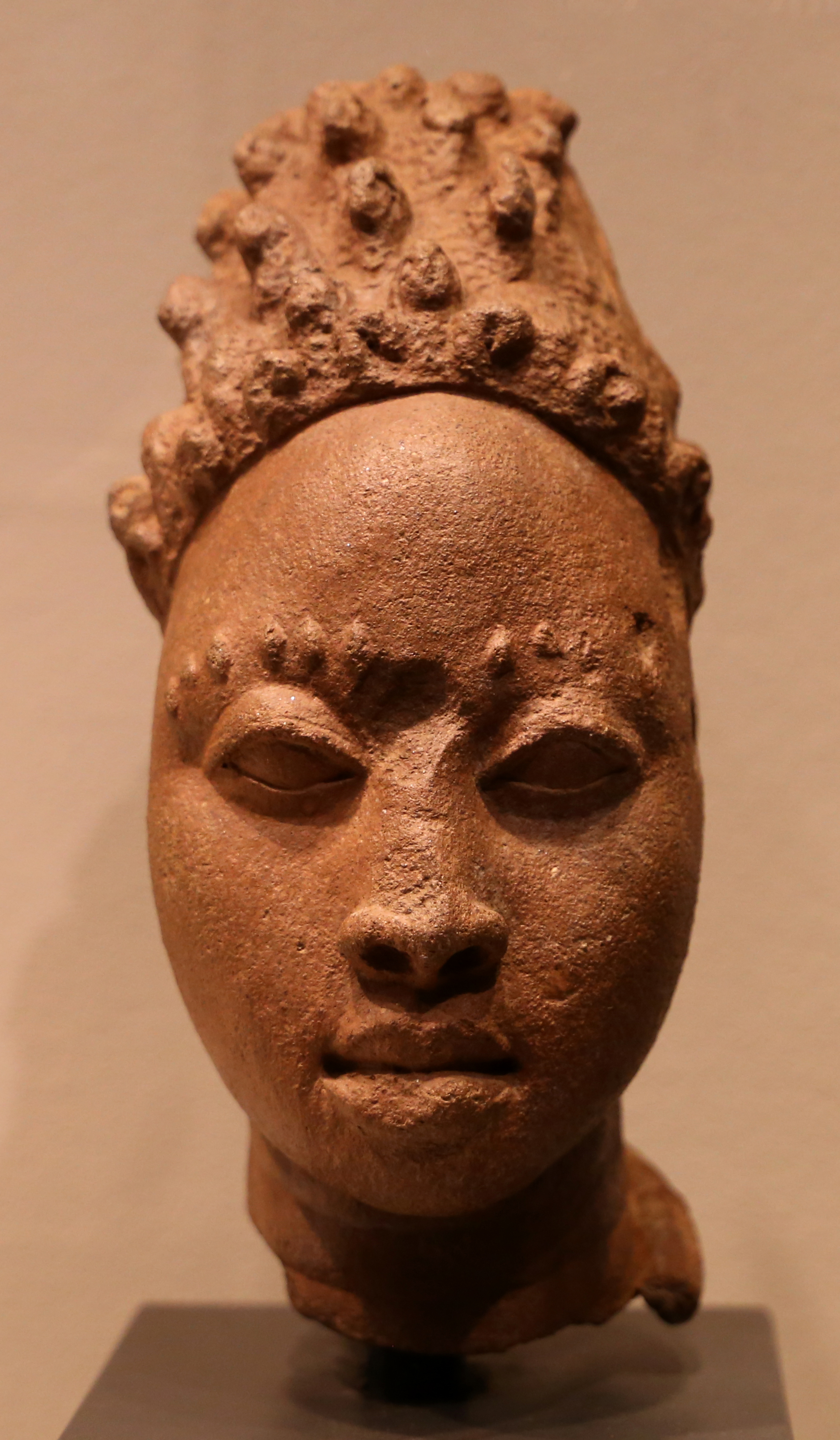
Ife, memorial head of a king or notable with tribal marking/scarification above eyes, terracotta, 12th-15th century

== Yoruba masquerade ==
The tendency in many African cosmologies to identify the body as a vehicle incarnating the soul on earth has encouraged the metaphoric use of the masquerade for a similar purpose. Egúngún, Gelede, and Epa are among the many types of Masquerade practiced by the Yoruba.

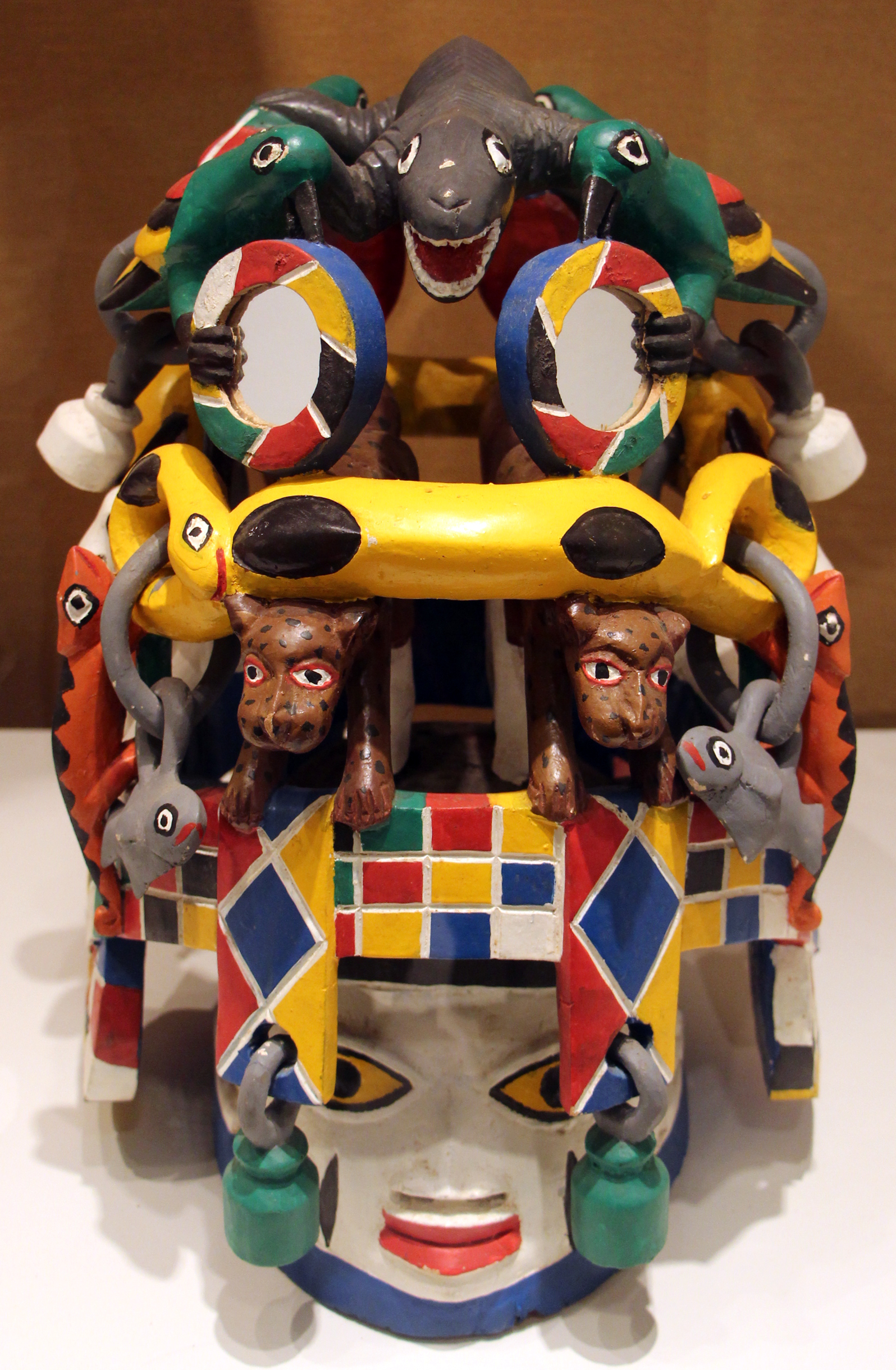
Gelede mask; Museu Afro Brasil (São Paulo, Brazil)

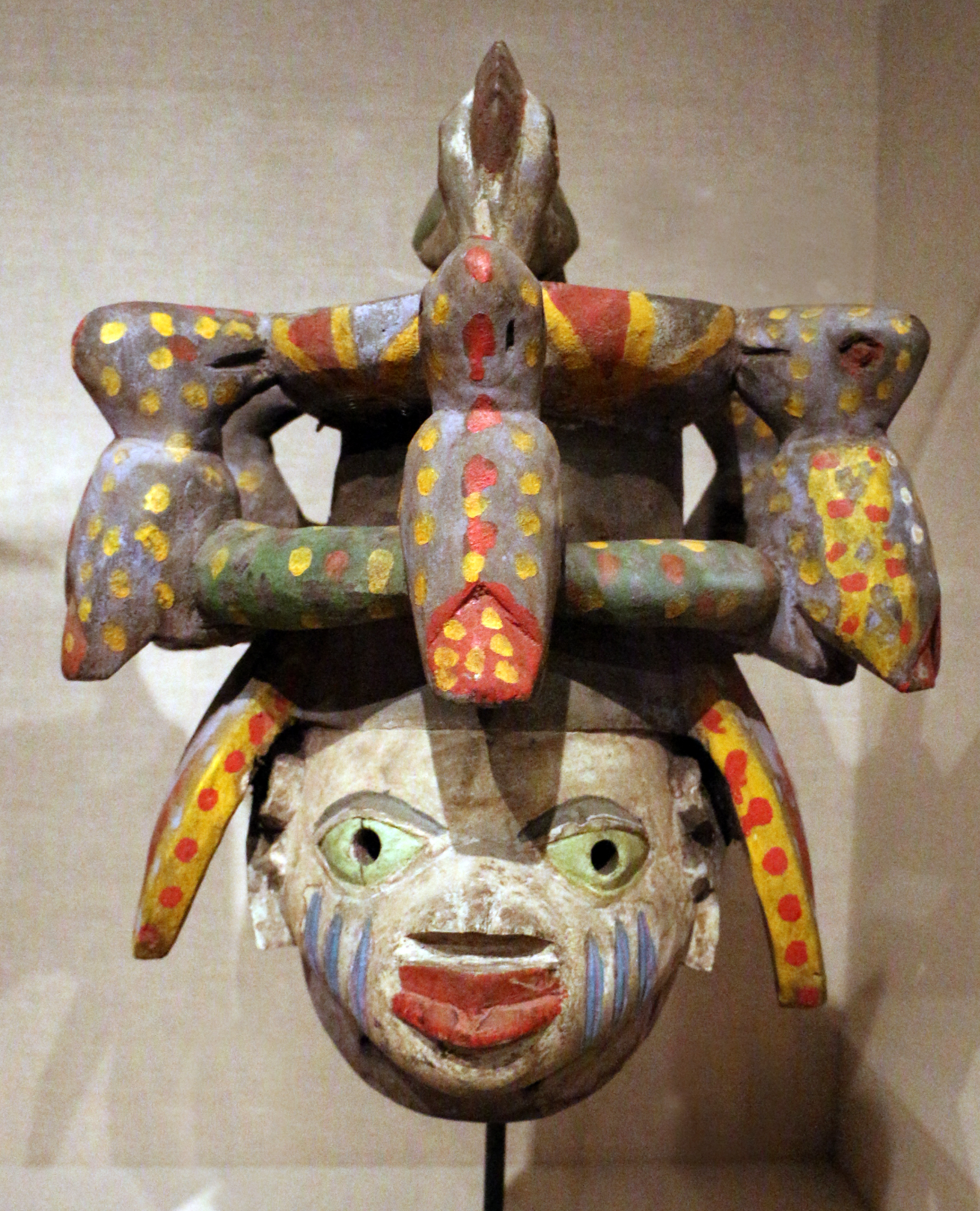
Mask with 7 birds; 19th-20th century; Detroit Institute of Arts (USA)

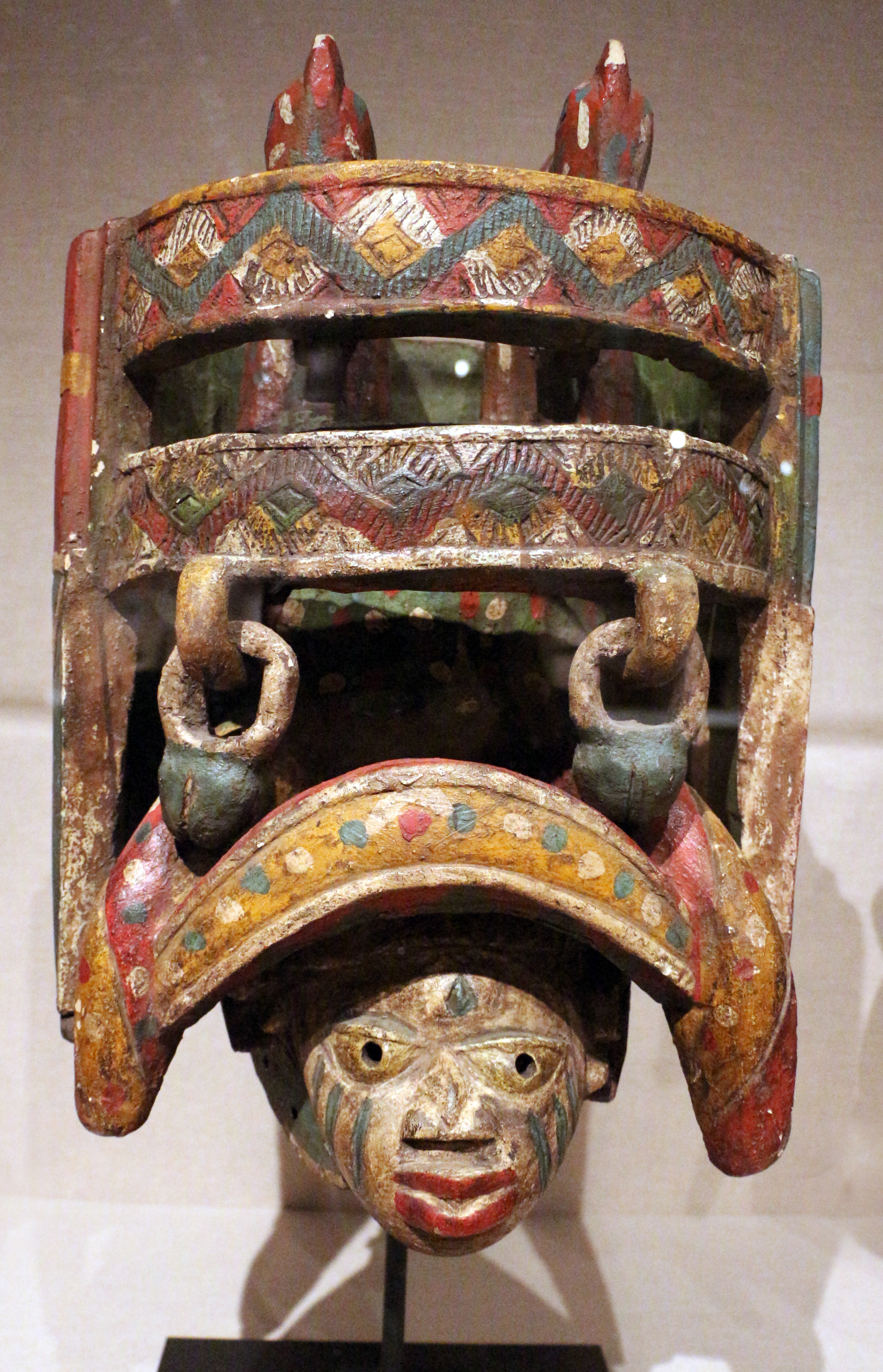
Mask with superstructure and two birds; 19th-20th century; Detroit Institute of Arts

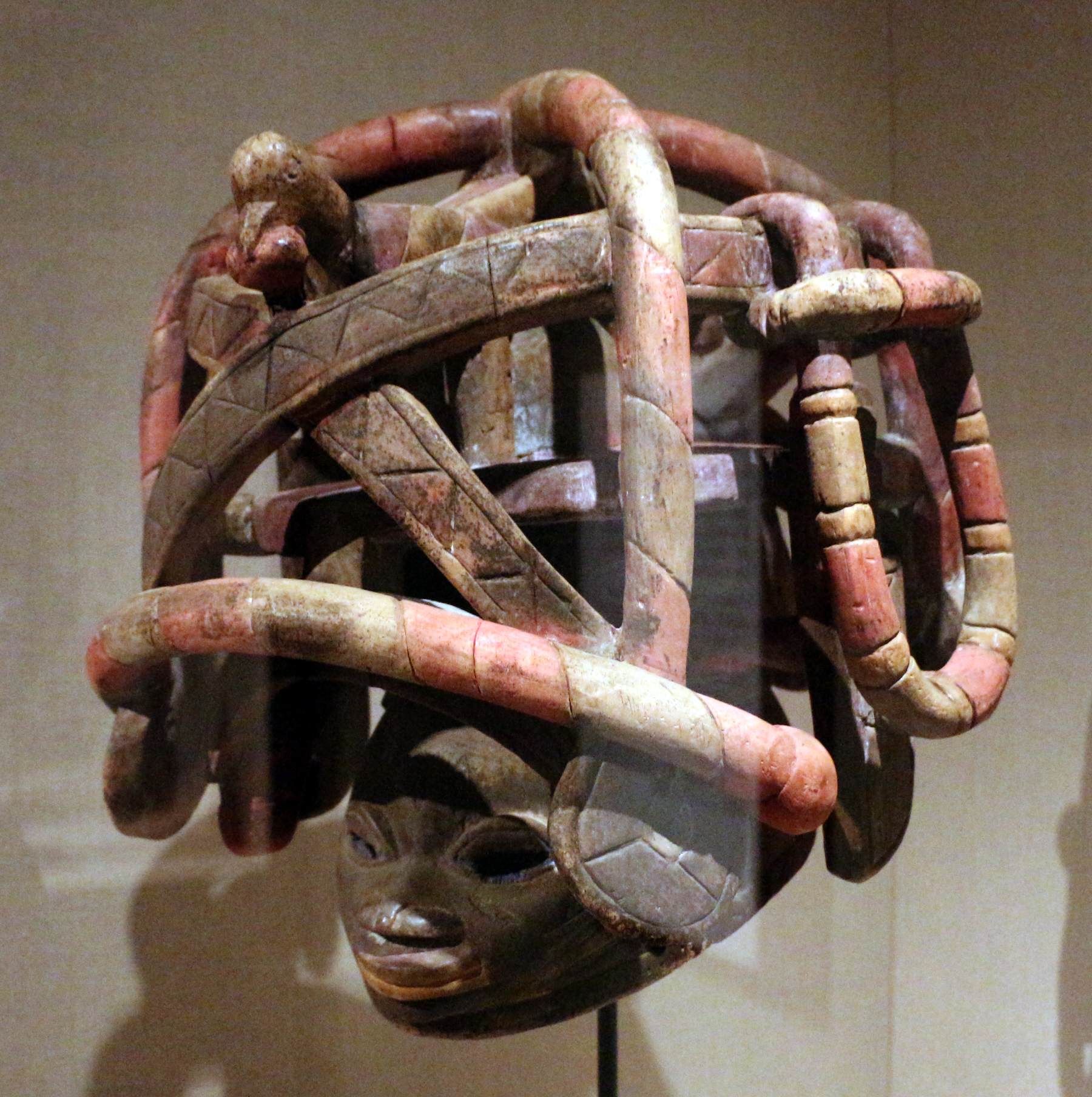
Headgear; circa 1900-1915; Detroit Institute of Arts

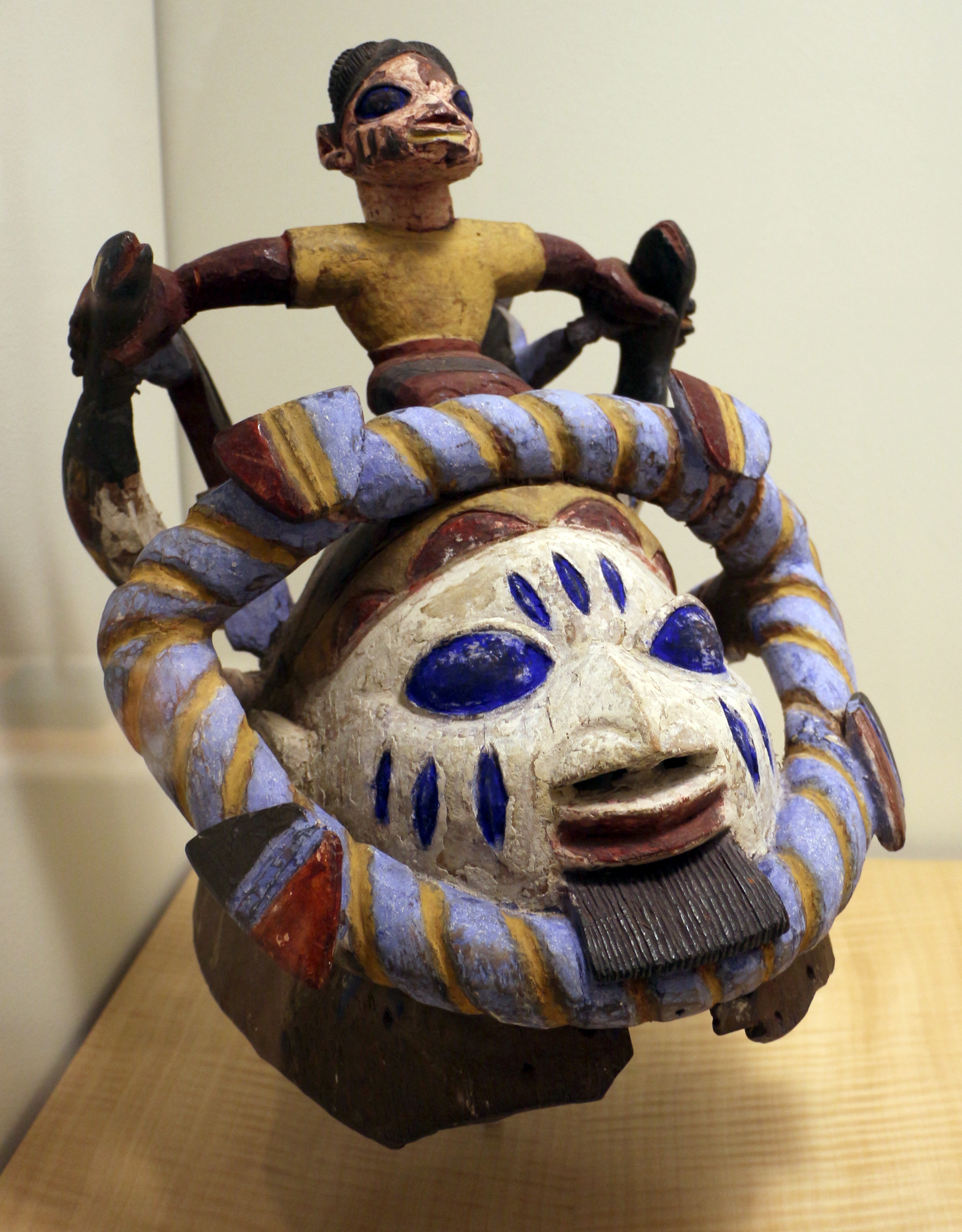
Carnival mask; circa 1950; Indianapolis Museum of Art (USA)

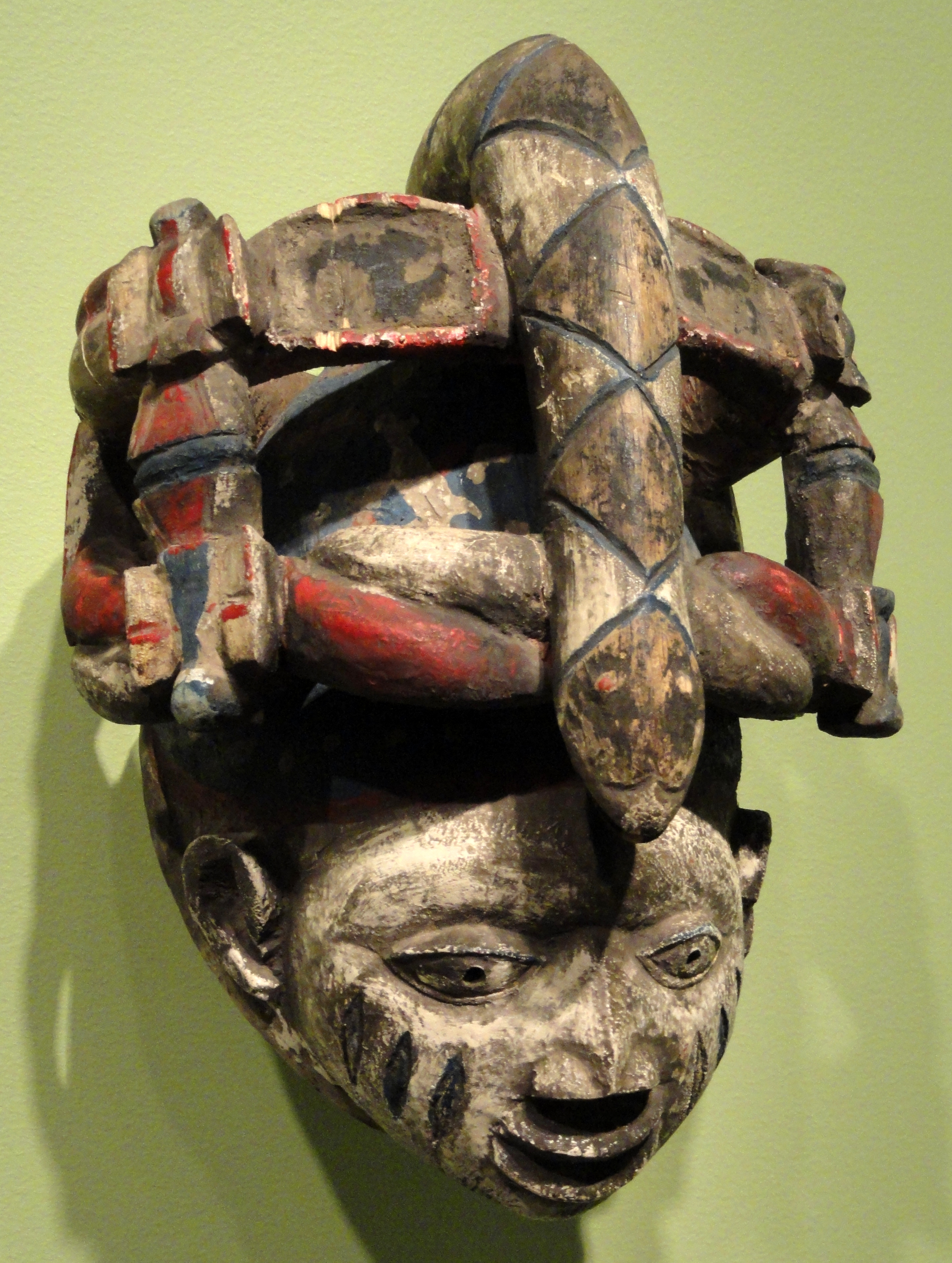
Mask; wood; Hood Museum of Art (USA)

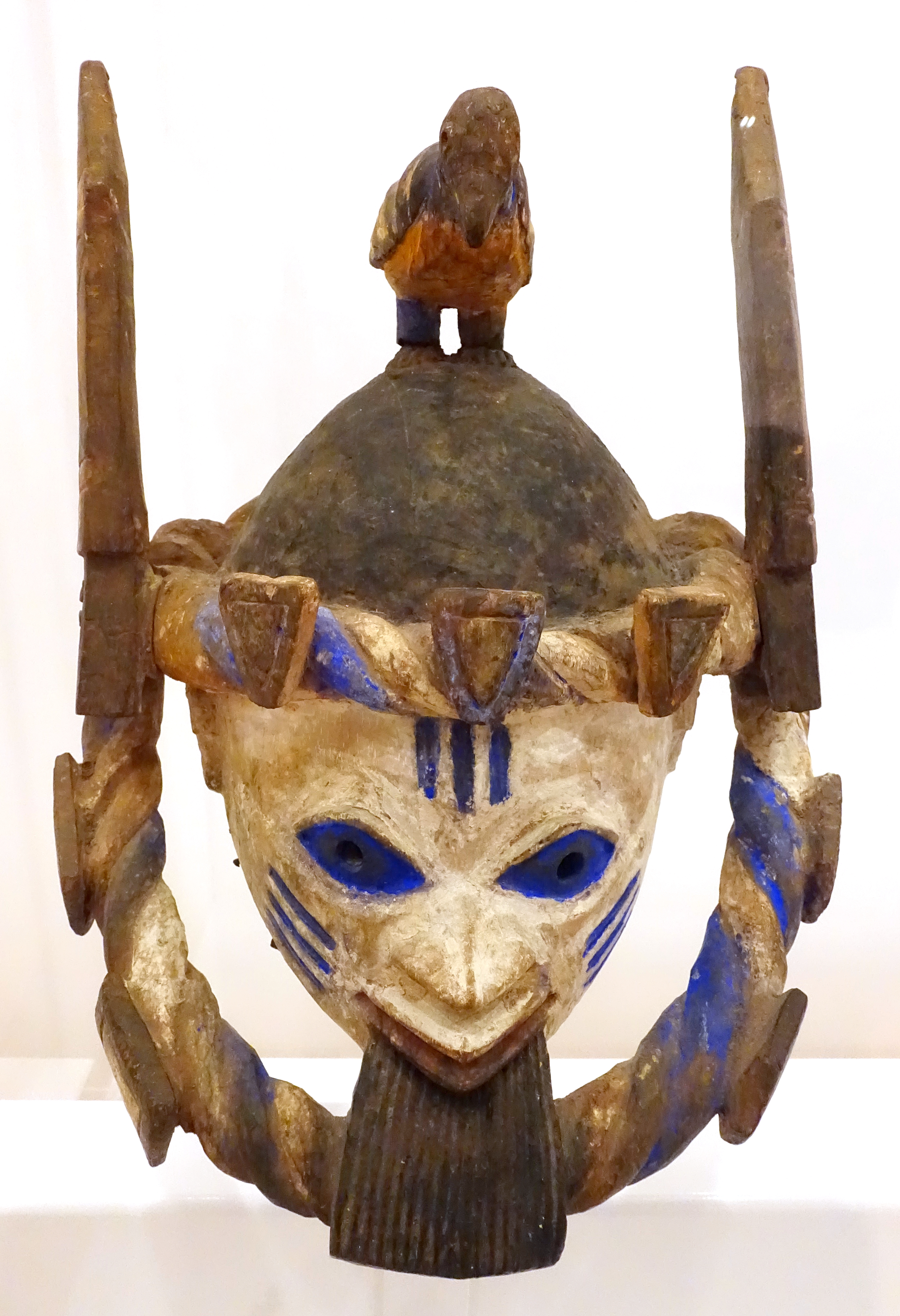
Efe-gelede mask; early 20th century AD; wood, indigo & white pigments; Krannert Art Museum (Illinois, USA)

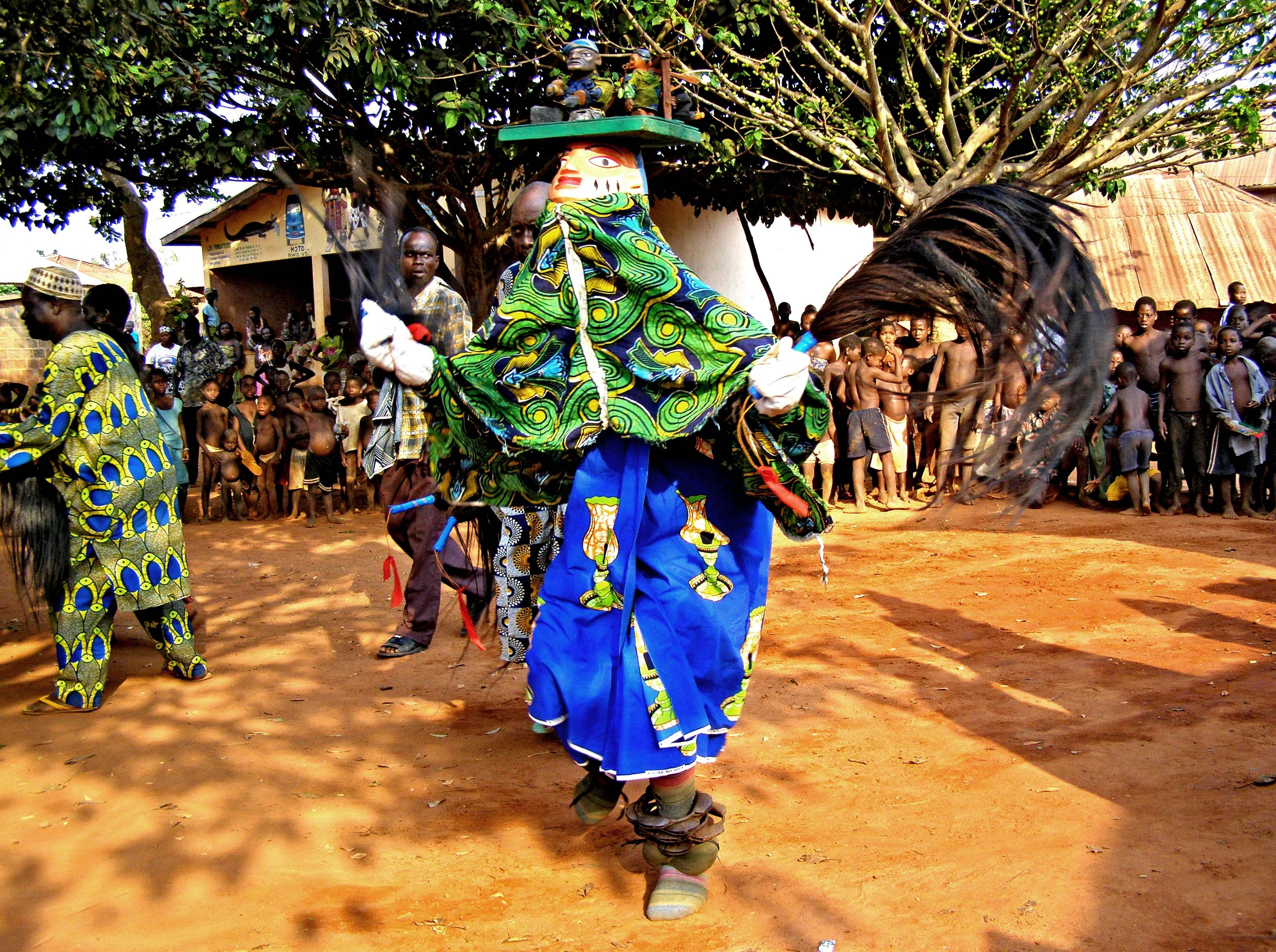
The Gelede Masked Festival in Cové, in Benin

== Yoruba crowns ==
The bead-embroidered crown (ade) with beaded veil, foremost attribute of the Oba, symbolizes the aspirations of a civilization at the highest level of authority. In his seminal article on the topic, Robert F. Thompson writes, "The crown incarnates the intuition of royal ancestral force, the revelation of great moral insight in the person of the king, and the glitter of aesthetic experience."

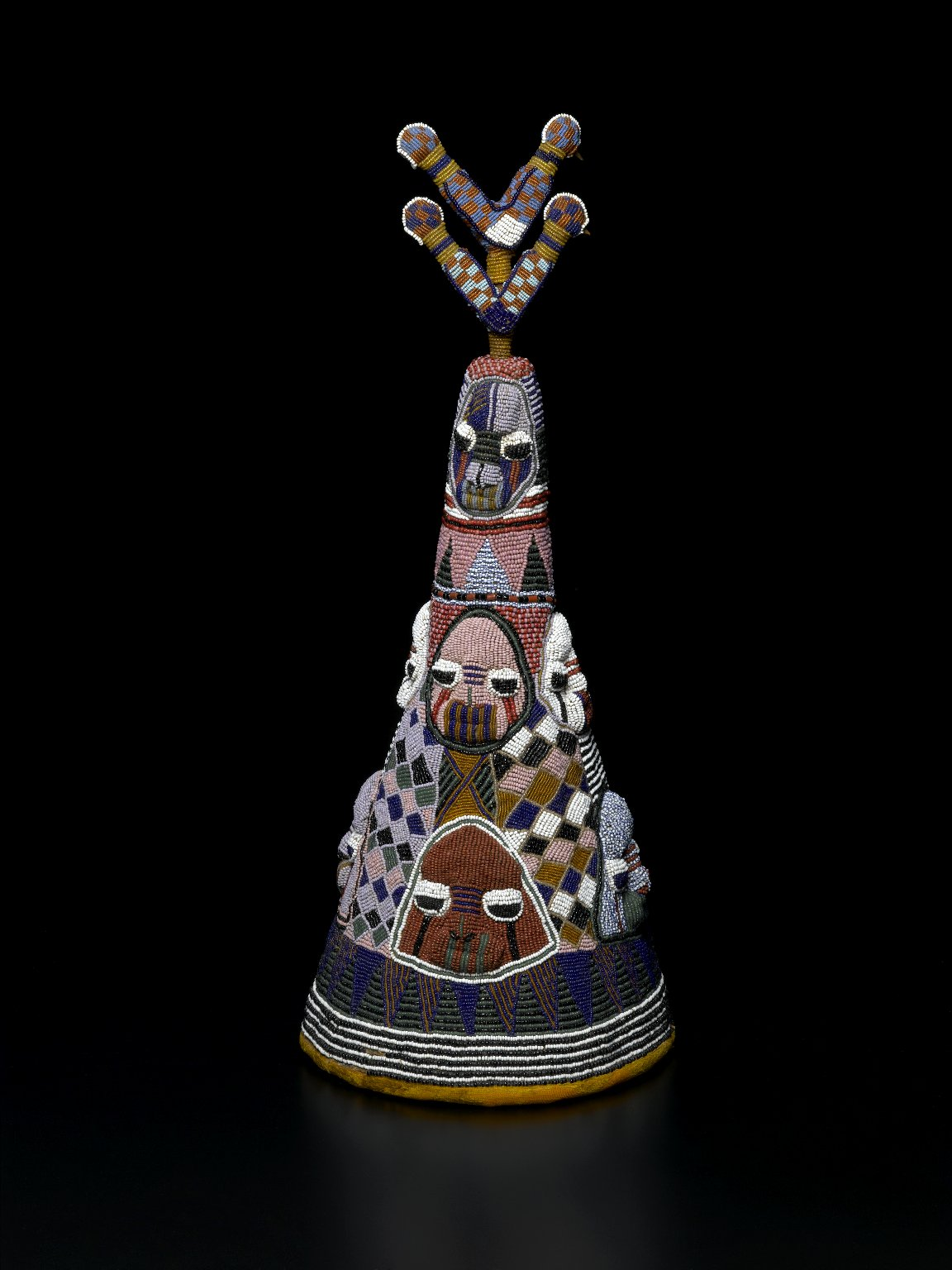
Beaded Crown (Ade) of Onijagbo Obasoro Alowolodu; late 19th or early 20th century; basketry frame covered by a stiffened cloth base which is embroidered with glass beads: white, blue, green, pink, red-orange, ochre, and violet; 57.8 x 21.6 cm (diameter) (22 3/4 x 8 1/2 in.); Brooklyn Museum (New York City)

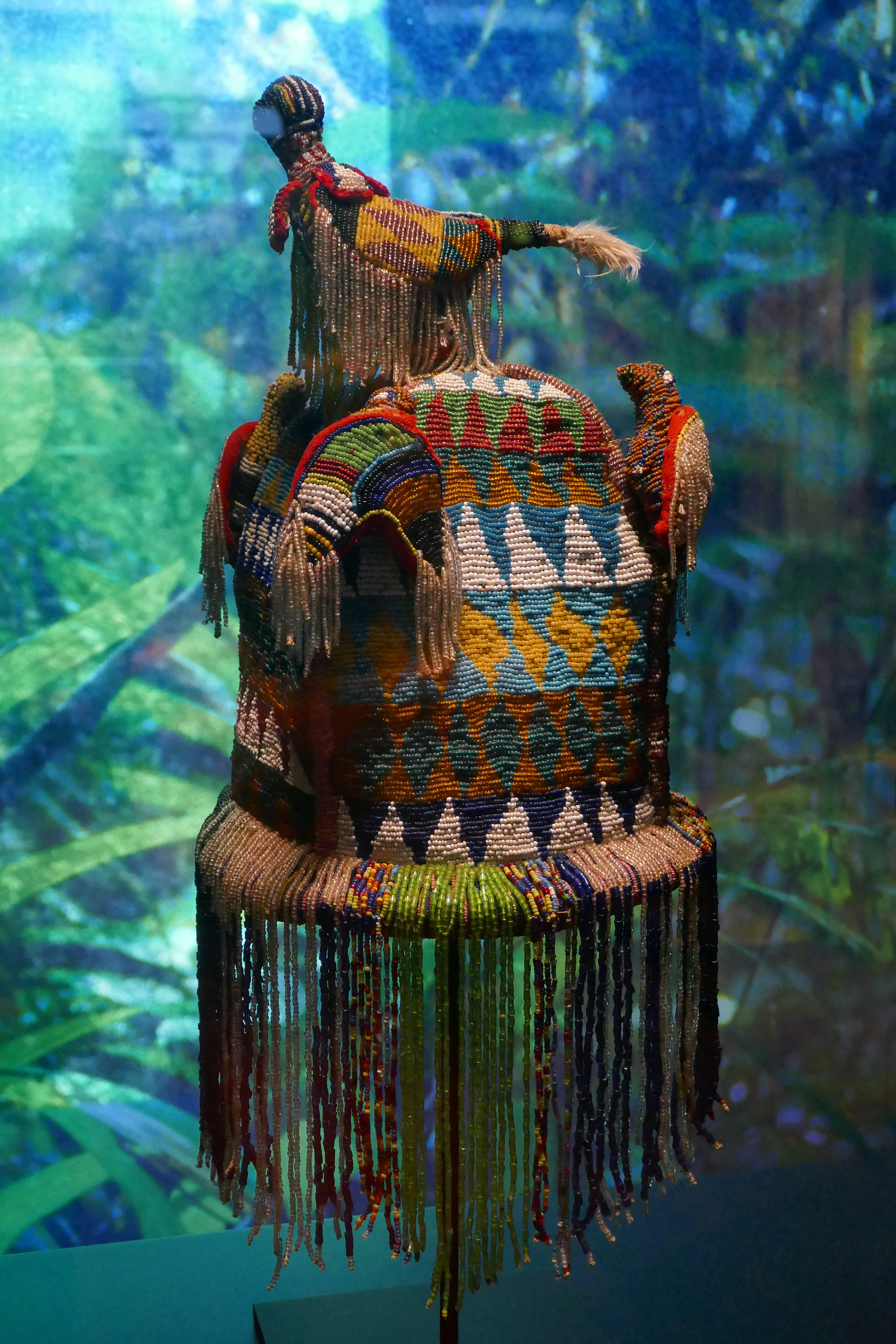
Yoruba royal ceremonial crown. Ade Nla or Ade Isenbaye. The beaded veil shields the Oba's own face and transforms him into a living embodiment of Odùduwà and the force of the collective ancestors. The birds signify that the Oba is a divine ruler. Half in the physical and half in the spiritual realms just as the birds can traverse both the terrestrial and the celestial. Musée du Quai Branly

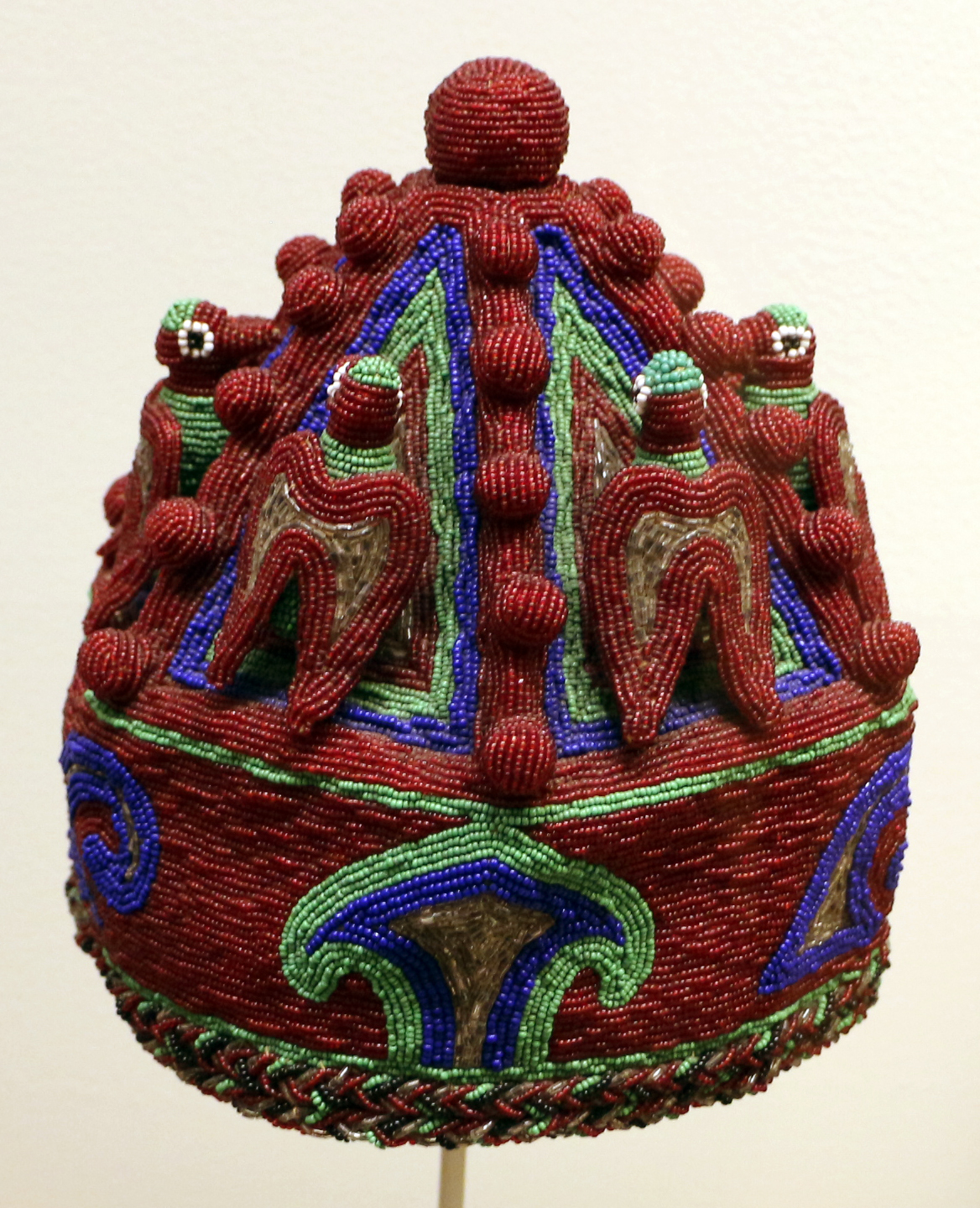
Beaded Oba's royal coronet (Akoro), Indianapolis Museum of Art. The Akoro was smaller than an Adé and was usually worn by lesser ranking kings under a regional Oba.

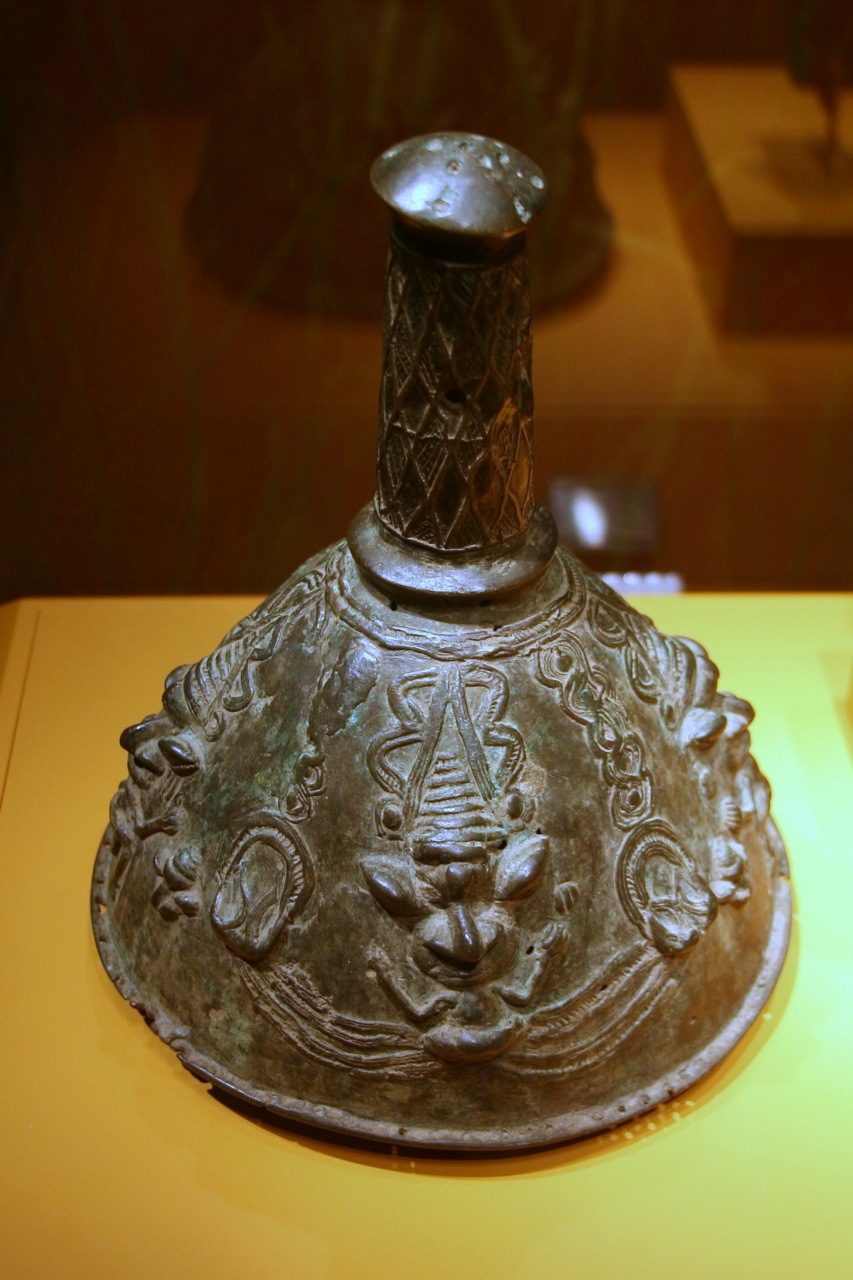
Yoruba 19th century copper alloy (brass) crown from Iperu following the typical Yoruba stem on cone ancestral crown designs. These crowns are used in the veneration of the paternal ancestors of Iperu (Ijebu) kings. The four staring faces represent the all-seeing gods or ancestors. Their protruding eyes signify when the spiritual eye replaces ordinary vision. The two figures with mudfish legs refer to supernatural powers in two realms, land and water, or reality and spirit.

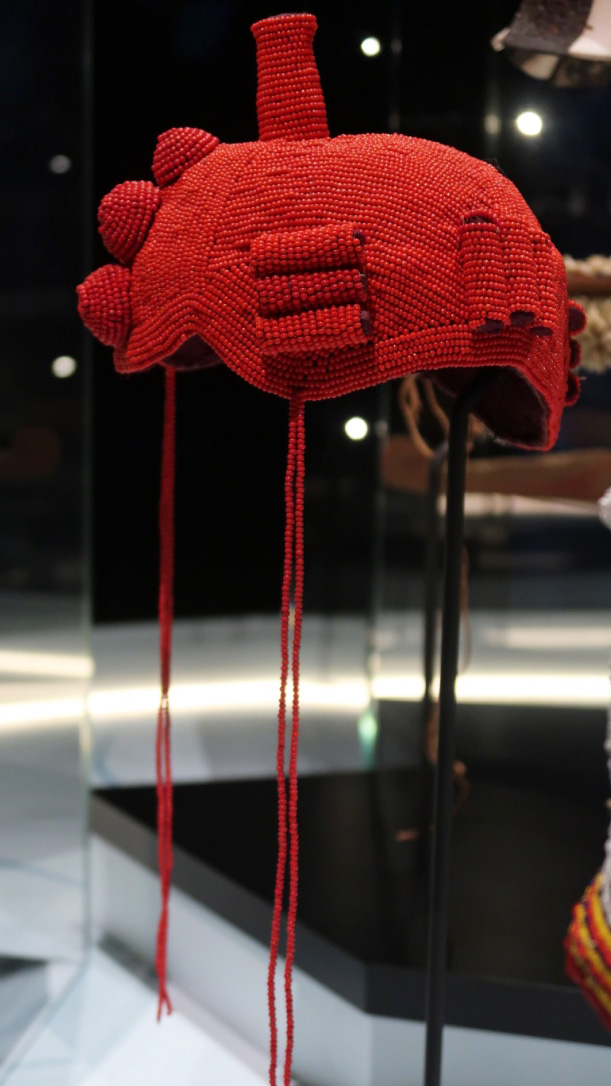
Royal headdress called Orikogbofo were lighter versions of ancestral crowns, which were often heavy and cumbersome. The orikogbofo fulfilled the function of keeping the Oba's head always covered, for it was taboo for an Oba to be seen bare headed. This style is now popular across southern Nigeria worn by various royals in the region. Remnant tassels of a beaded veil that should completely shield the Oba's face has been extensively reduced to a few convenient strings.

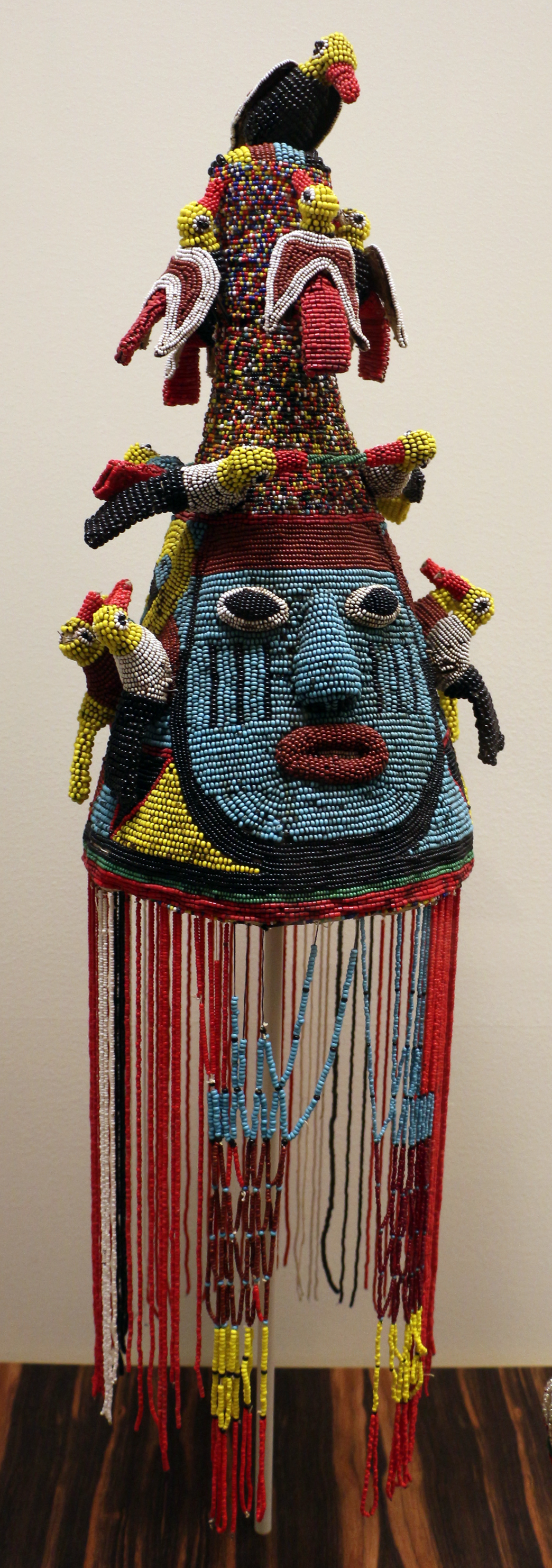
Yoruba ancestral royal crown (Ade Nla)

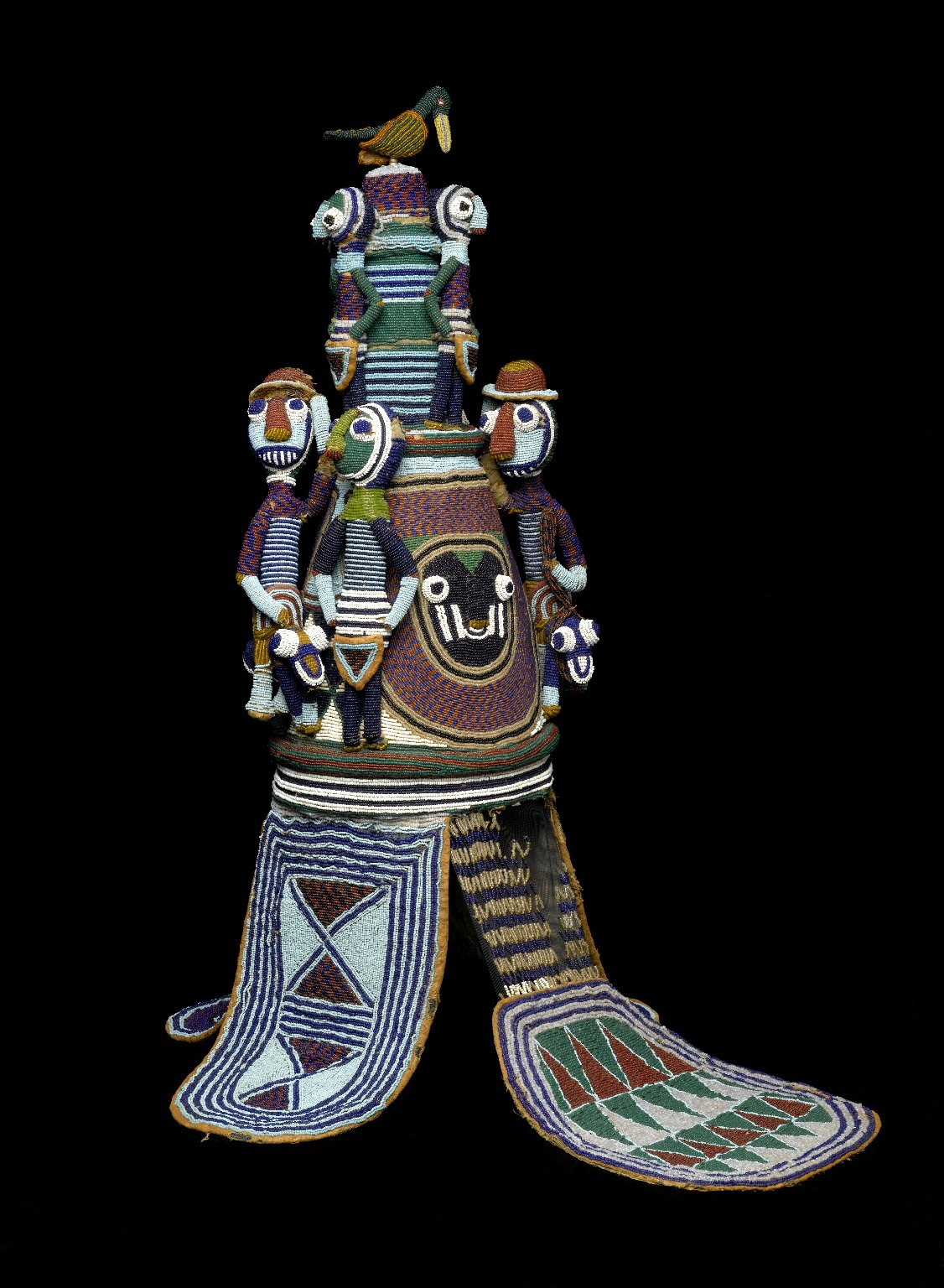
Beaded Crown (Ade) of Onijagbo Obasoro Alowolodu, The Ogoga of Ikere Ekiti; late 19th century; basketry frame, covered with beaded cloth; 95.9 x 24.1 cm (37 3/4 x 9 1/2 in.); Brooklyn Museum

== Alarinjo ==
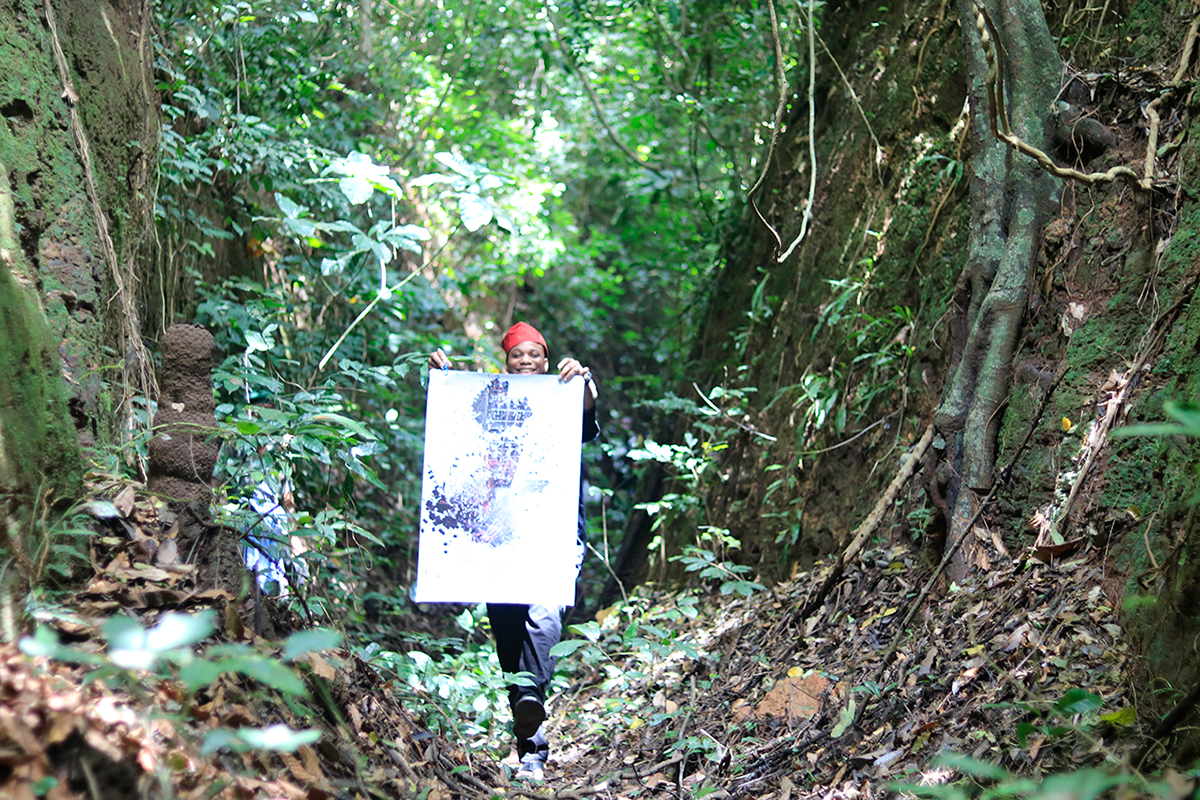
Olufeko inside Sungbo's Eredo holding the Philosophers Legacy heirloom in 2017

There is also a vibrant form of customary theatre known as Alarinjo that has its roots in the medieval period and that has given much to the contemporary Nigerian film industry.

== Esiẹ Museum ==
The museum in Esiẹ, Irepodun (Kwara state), was the first to be established in Nigeria when it opened in 1945. The museum once housed over one thousand tombstone figures or images representing human beings. It is reputed to have the largest collection of soapstone images in the world. Its works of art have also been said to bear resemblances to those of the Nok culture. In modern times, the Esie museum has been the center of religious activities and hosts a festival in the month of April every year.
