= Ninth German Inner Africa Research Expedition =

The Ninth German Inner Africa Research Expedition was led by Leo Frobenius to Southern Africa between August 1928 and March 1930. It visited modern-day South Africa, Zimbabwe, Botswana, Lesotho, Mozambique, Namibia and Zambia. It recorded a large quantity of indigenous rock art, which helped Frobenius to build one of the most important collections of such work, some of which was sold to South African museums. It also investigated ancient ore mines and provided samples for some of the first metallographic and chemical analysis of southern African indigenous metals.

== Background ==
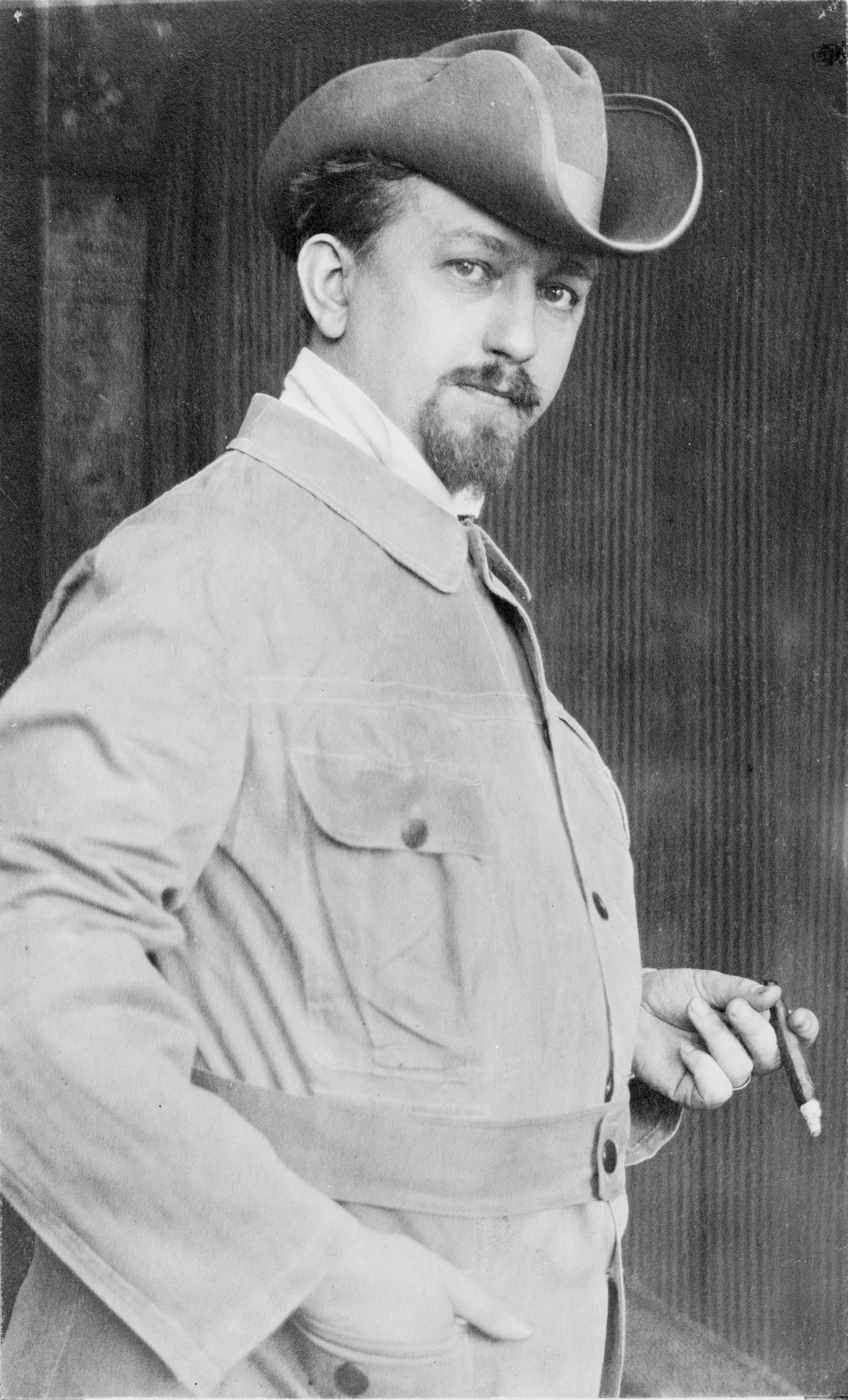
Leo Frobenius

Leo Frobenius was a self-taught German ethnologist and archaeologist who specialised in African cultures. He led twelve German Inner Africa Research Expeditions (Deutsche Innerafrikanische Forschungs-Expeditions, DIAFE) to Africa between 1904 and 1935. His work in the field has been described as epic and pioneering and is of considerable documentary value. However, his conclusions on the development of African civilisation from non-African origins were controversial and are not supported by modern writers. He has also been accused of using the expeditions to loot items of cultural value from Africa.

== Planning ==
The ninth expedition was undertaken between August 1928 and March 1930 and visited Southern Africa – including modern-day South Africa, Zimbabwe, Botswana, Lesotho, Mozambique, Namibia and Zambia. Frobenius led the expedition which consisted of his daughter, Ruth; three ethnographers (including Adolf Ellegard Jensen) and four artists. Its aims were to research "southern Erythraean cultures" (an ancient Greek designation for part of Africa), study the ruins of Great Zimbabwe, study ancient mines and to locate and copy "bushman drawings" (rock art). Frobenius was particularly keen to examine the rock art which he considered provided the "oldest tangible records of humanity". The expedition was planned to coincide with a joint meeting of the South African Association for the Advancement of Science and the British Association for the Advancement of Science in South Africa from July to August 1929.

== Expedition ==
The expedition arrived in Cape Town in late 1928 and established at base at a large house in Eloff's Estate near Pretoria. The expedition spent the remainder of 1928 in the Transvaal, Orange Free State and Basutoland. Over a period of five weeks the expedition visited 11 sites in the Drakensberg to record rock paintings. These, together with a series of engravings, were exhibited in Pretoria over Christmas at events attended by South African leaders Jan Smuts and James Hertzog. Smuts and Hertzog requested Frobenius' assistance with setting up collections of cultural documents in South African museums.

Upon his return to Germany Frobenius published two substantial accounts of the expedition as Madsimu Dsangara, Südafrikanische Felsbilderchroik and Erythräa, Länder und Zeiten des heiligen Königsmordes.

=== Rock art ===
From 17 January 1929 the expedition split into different parties: Frobenius and Jensen when to Southern Rhodesia and Mozambique by car and three of the painters went to Natal by train. Groups looked at rock art separately in Natal, the Cape Orange Free State, Basutoland, Northern and Southern Rhodesia and South West Africa. All members of the team were involved in locating and photographing the works while the painters and Frobenius made copies of the artwork. Frobenius documented one particularly extensive rock art site at Cinyati, which is now known as eBusingatha in the northern KwaZulu-Natal Drakensberg. This site was affected by removal of some of the art in 1947 and a series of collapses in the late 1990s so Frobenius' documentation of the untouched site is valuable as a record of its earlier condition. The rock paintings date from between 500 and 1820 AD.

In all Frobenius and his team made reproductions (primarily in watercolour) of 2,000 articles of African rock art from across Zimbabwe, Lesotho, Namibia and South Africa. This helped to make the Frobenius collection of the most significant records of rock art in the world in terms of scale and geographical coverage and Frobenius is sometimes credited with making the first major contribution to the study of rock art in Southern Africa. In addition to rock art the painters also captured aspects of local culture such as architecture and local dress. Some 400 of these paintings were produced, in addition to 3,000 photographs and a 16mm film reel. The expedition also recorded the stories, myths and poems of local people. Frobenius attempted to link the cultural record to the myths depicted in the rock art.

Five hundred of the paintings were sold to the Iziko Museums of South Africa in 1931 for £5,000. These are now held in the South African Museum in Cape Town and have been digitised and made available for viewing online. The remaining material and the written records are held by the Frobenius Institute in Frankfurt, though in depth research on them has not yet been carried out.

=== Metallurgy ===
The expedition also collected a wide range of ethnological artefacts. Many of these were made of metal and were analysed in Germany by Professor EH Schulz. In addition the expedition explored prehistoric tin and copper mines in the northern Transvaal and Rhodesia and samples of metals recovered were also tested by Szhulz. This was the first metallographic and chemical analysis of southern African indigenous metal - ahead of GH Stanley's more famous work in the Transvaal in 1931.

Schulz took samples from inconspicuous area of the artefacts, which were largely made from iron, steel and bronze. The bronze, which was used to make wire, rings and bead, was found to be made from a mixture of 90% copper and 10% tin - a similar composition to that found in modern bronze. In addition some beads were found to be made from pure copper or copper gilded with gold. A silver-based jewellery chain was also discovered. It was found to be of a unique alloy with copper and zinc that provided a durable and corrosion resistant material, amenable to melting and casting. Duncan Miller writing in 1992 considered it unlikely that this item was of African manufacture owing to the use of soldering and level of silver and zinc content.

Schulz assessed several chisels and wedge tools that he found to be made of alternating layers of low and high carbon steel, similar to wrought iron. This may have been intentionally made so that the soft portion swore away to leave a fresh, hard cutting edge. He speculated that the tools were made using the bloomery hearth, which was invented circa 3000 BC. Some of the tools showed evidence that hardening had been achieved through quenching of the material.
