= Elisabeth Pauli =

German artist and ethnographer

- Elisabeth Charlotte Pauli
- Born: 24 September 1906; Cologne
- Died: 24 October 1984 (aged 78); Frankfurt am Main
- Other names: Elisabeth Jensen
- Education: Kölner Werkschulen
- Spouse: Adolf Ellegard Jensen
- Scientific career
- Fields: rock art, ethnography
- Institutions: Frobenius Institute

Elisabeth Charlotte Pauli (Cologne, 1906 – Frankfurt am Main, 1984) was an artist and ethnographer working at the Frobenius Institute in Frankfurt am Main. She participated in several expeditions of the institute as participant and co-organiser, and produced a large number of copies of prehistoric rock art in Europe and Africa. During the Second World War she and three other women acted as the temporary management of the institute.

== Life and work ==
Pauli was born to landowner and military official Heinrich Pauli (1867–1924) and his wife Maria Johanna Pauli (née Bürgers; 1889–ca. 1950). She was educated at a school for upper-class girls in Cologne, followed by a six-month course at the Großherzogin Luise-Haushaltungsschule in Baden-Baden. She then enrolled at the Kölner Werkschulen, the Cologne Art and Craft Schools. During this time she spent three months at the Institut du Panthéon in Paris to study French. In addition, she took private lessons with designers Fritz August Breuhaus and Johannes Itten.

From 1928 to 1930 she worked as a designer of interior textiles in Hans Heinz Lüttgen's workshop in Cologne. She then was appointed artistic leader of the exhibitions of the Cologne Fair (Messeamt), where she oversaw the exhibitions "Das Kind" and "Schutz von Eigentum und Leben". On 1 January 1933 Pauli was employed at the Frobenius Institute in Frankfurt am Main as an artist and draughtswoman. She took part in the expeditions of the institute led by Leo Frobenius and later Adolf Ellegard Jensen, during which she copied rock art, drew images and maps of the material culture studied by the expeditions, and took photographs and films of the expedition members as well as the people they studied.

During the Second World War many male Frobenius Institute members, including management, were drafted into military service. In their absence Karin Hahn-Hissink took charge of the institute, assisted by Pauli, Hildegard Klein and Hertha von Dechend. They ensured the survival of the institute and its valuable collections. Pauli had a close friendship with Hissink.

After the war she again participated in the institute's expeditions, not only as artist and photographer, but also as anthropologist, organiser and coordinator.

Pauli was a member of the following Frobenius Institute expeditions:

- 1933: Libyan Desert ("Libyen II")
- 1934-1935: Transjordan and Libyan Desert
- 1934: southern France and eastern Spain
- 1936: northern and northwestern Spain
- 1936: Val Camonica, Italy ("Italien II")
- 1937: Val Camonica and Istria ("Italien III")
- 1950-1952: southern Ethiopia ("Äthiopien II")
- 1954-1955: southern Ethiopia ("Äthiopien III")

The archives of the Frobenius Institute hold many drawings, paintings, pre-studies, reports, notes and photographs by Pauli. She was for many years one of the constants in the institute, where she created a pleasant working atmosphere and kept warm interpersonal contacts with the other institute members.

In 1952 Pauli married Adolf Ellegard Jensen (1899–1965), then director, with whom she had long collaborated in the institute and on expedities.

== Trivia ==
In 1933 Pauli copied rock paintings in the "Cave of Swimmers" in the het Gilf Kebir plateau in the Western Desert of Egypt, made famous by the 1992 novel by Michael Ondaatje and 1996 film The English Patient. The Hungarian Count and desert explorer László E. Almásy invited Frobenius, Hans Rhotert and Pauli to examine the rock art he discovered here.

Throughout her career at the Frobenius Institute Pauli is mentioned by her first given name, Elisabeth, while her family called her Lotte (after her second given name, Charlotte). After marrying she continued to use her birth name; occasionally she was referred to as Elisabeth Jensen. In the institute she had the nickname "Paulus" (in line with colleague Helmut Petri, nicknamed "Petrus").

== Publications (selection) ==
Pauli's anthropological studies of Ethiopia were published in Altvölker Süd-Äthiopiens (met E. Haberland, Ad. E. Jensen en W. Schulz-Weidner). W. Kohlhammer, Stuttgart, 1959. She often collaborated (sometimes uncredited) on publications of other institute members, and to (the register of) Afrika. Handbuch der angewandten Völkerkunde by Hugo Bernatzik. Her copies of rock art were and are shown in exhibitions and catalogues of the Frobenius Institute, e.g.: exhibition catalogue "Kunst der Vorzeit. Felsbilder aus der Sammlung Frobenius", Gropius Bau 2016.

== Sources ==
- G. Stappert, "Elisabeth Charlotte Pauli", in: Museum Giersch, Frobenius Institut, Frobenius. Die Kunst des Forschens (Petersberg 2019), 225-229 (in German).
- B. Beer, Frauen in der deutschsprachigen Ethnologie: ein Handbuch (Köln 2007), 105-110 (in German).
- "Pauli, Elisabeth (*1906; †1984)", biography on website Frobenius Institut (accessed 25 April 2021).
- E. Haberland, "[Nachruf auf] Elisabeth Charlotte Jensen, geb. Pauli 1906-1984", Paideuma 31, XIII-XX (in German; not found).
- Elisabeth Pauli, The Soul of the Expedition. Poster in exhibition "Where Women Smoke and Banana Trees Grow No Fruit" at the Frobenius Institute, 2011 (accessed 25 April 2021).
- E. Seibert, "Am Fels. Die Kunstmalerinnen der Felsbild-Expeditionen des Leo Frobenius", in: UniReport (Goethe-Universität Frankfurt am Main) 8. Dezember 2011, p. 18-19 (in German; accessed 25 April 2021).
- M. Sperling, "Rocking out in Berlin", Apollo Magazine 14 March 2016 (accessed 25 April 2021).
