= Quiggin =

Quiggin is a surname. Notable people with this surname include:

- Alison Hingston Quiggin (1874–1971), British anthropologist, wife of Edmund
- Edmund Crosby Quiggin (1875–1920), British linguist and scholar
- John Quiggin (born 1956), Australian economist and professor
- Robynne Quiggin (born 20th century), Australian lawyer

== Other uses ==
- Quiggin's, confectionery producer in England

== See also ==
- Quiggins, former indoor market in Liverpool
- Quigg
