= German Inner Africa Research Expeditions =

Series of 14 expeditions to Africa carried out between 1904 and 1955

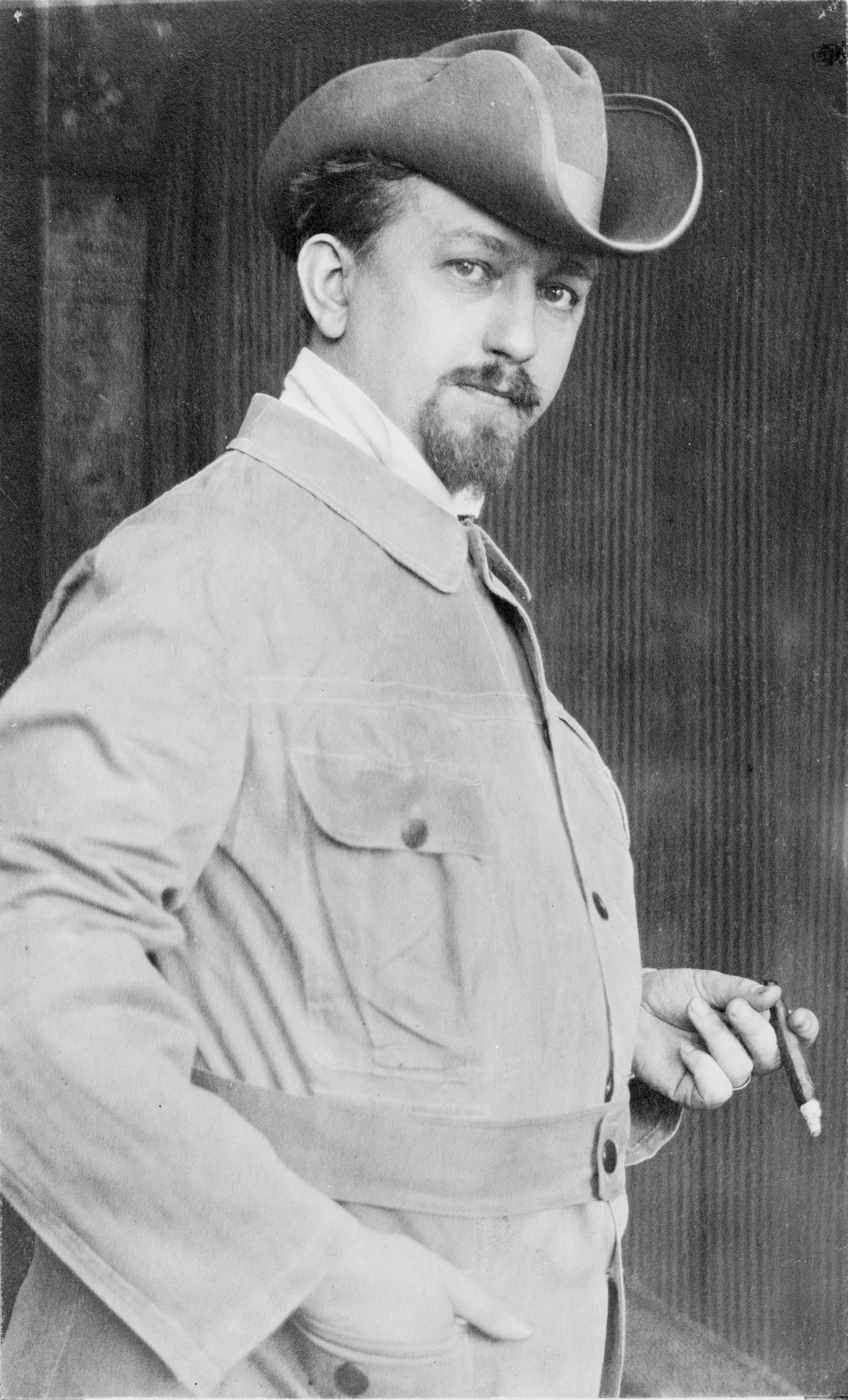
Leo Frobenius

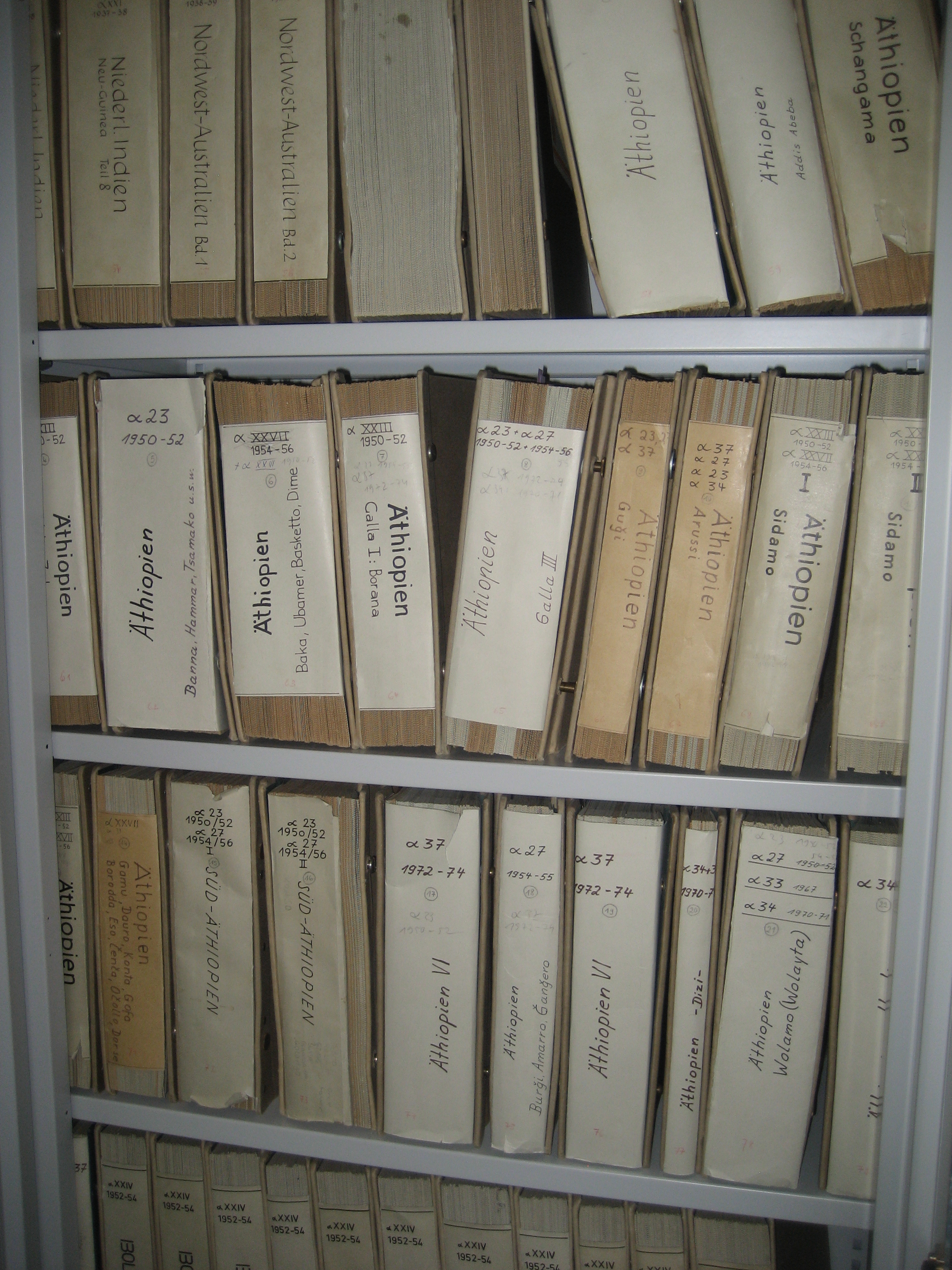
Original albums containing photographs taken during the expeditions

The German Inner Africa Research Expeditions (Deutsche Innerafrikanische Forschungs-Expeditionen, DIAFE) were a series of 14 expeditions to Africa carried out between 1904 and 1955 by German scientists. The first 12 of these expeditions were led by the ethnologist Leo Frobenius and they are sometimes referred to as the Frobenius Expeditions.

== Overview ==
Leo Frobenius was a self-taught German ethnologist and archaeologist who specialised in African cultures. He published his first articles on Africa at the age of 21 (circa 1894). Frobenius led twelve German Inner Africa Research Expeditions (Deutsche Innerafrikanische Forschungs-Expeditions, DIAFE) to Africa between 1904 and 1935. He intended these to comprise a systematic analysis of African culture. Frobenius published details of the expeditions in numerous books and journal articles and the majority of his original field notes, drawings and photographs have survived with many being preserved at the Frobenius Institute in Frankfurt. Two further expeditions were organised after Frobenius' 1938 death by his student Adolf Ellegard Jensen.

The scale of the expeditions has been described as epic and Frobenius' work is of considerable value for its documentary nature. Frobenius has been described as the "pioneering German comparative ethnographer of Africa" and a "master of the general survey" and was in the development of anthropology in Germany. He developed the theory of "culture morphology" - the idea of culture as a living organism and its development by diffusion from a limited number of "culture areas" (for example the ancient Greeks). For Frobenius, the Yoruba culture did not derive from pre-existing non-African cultures but was considered a remainder of a "culture circle" on its own, not influenced from Europe. Frobenius ideas have proved controversial and are not supported by modern writers. Frobenius has also been accused of using the expeditions to loot items of cultural value from Africa.

== First expedition ==
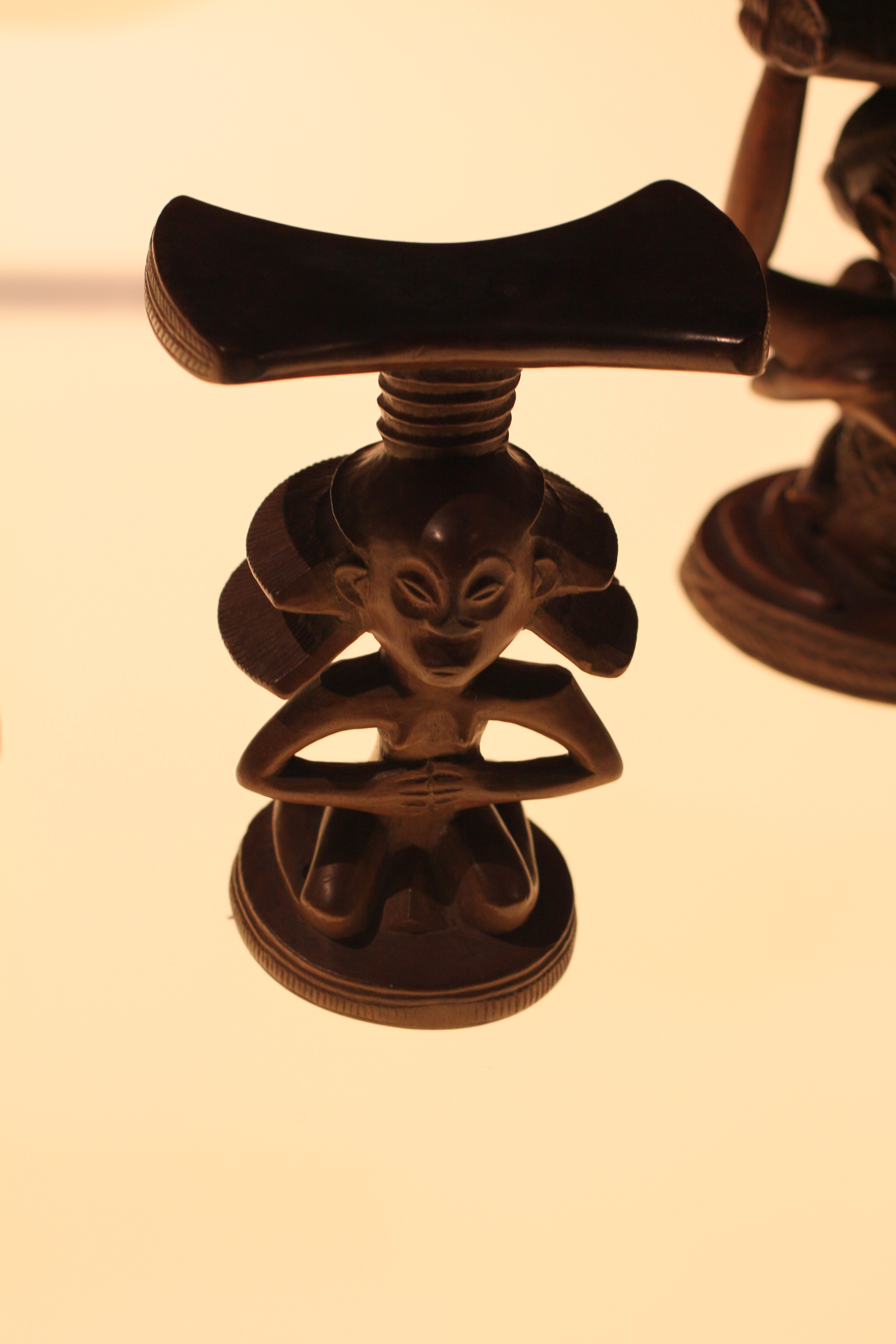
An ornate neck support brought back by Frobenius from the first expedition

Frobenius provided the initial funding for this expedition himself. It ran from 1904 to 1906 and explored the Kasai region of the Congo. Frobenius himself later described it as an "almost foolhardy" enterprise in which he undertook with a Hamburg Museum to supply as many artefacts as possible for a low price. Frobenius' wife Editha was in charge of organising the movements of the expedition and managing supplies of food, water and medicine. The expedition also had a dedicated artist by the name of Lemme. The expedition returned to Germany in 1906 having secured 8,000 pieces for the museum. Frobenius published Im Schatten des Kongostaates (In the Shadow of the Congo State) in 1907 based on this expedition.

== Second expedition ==
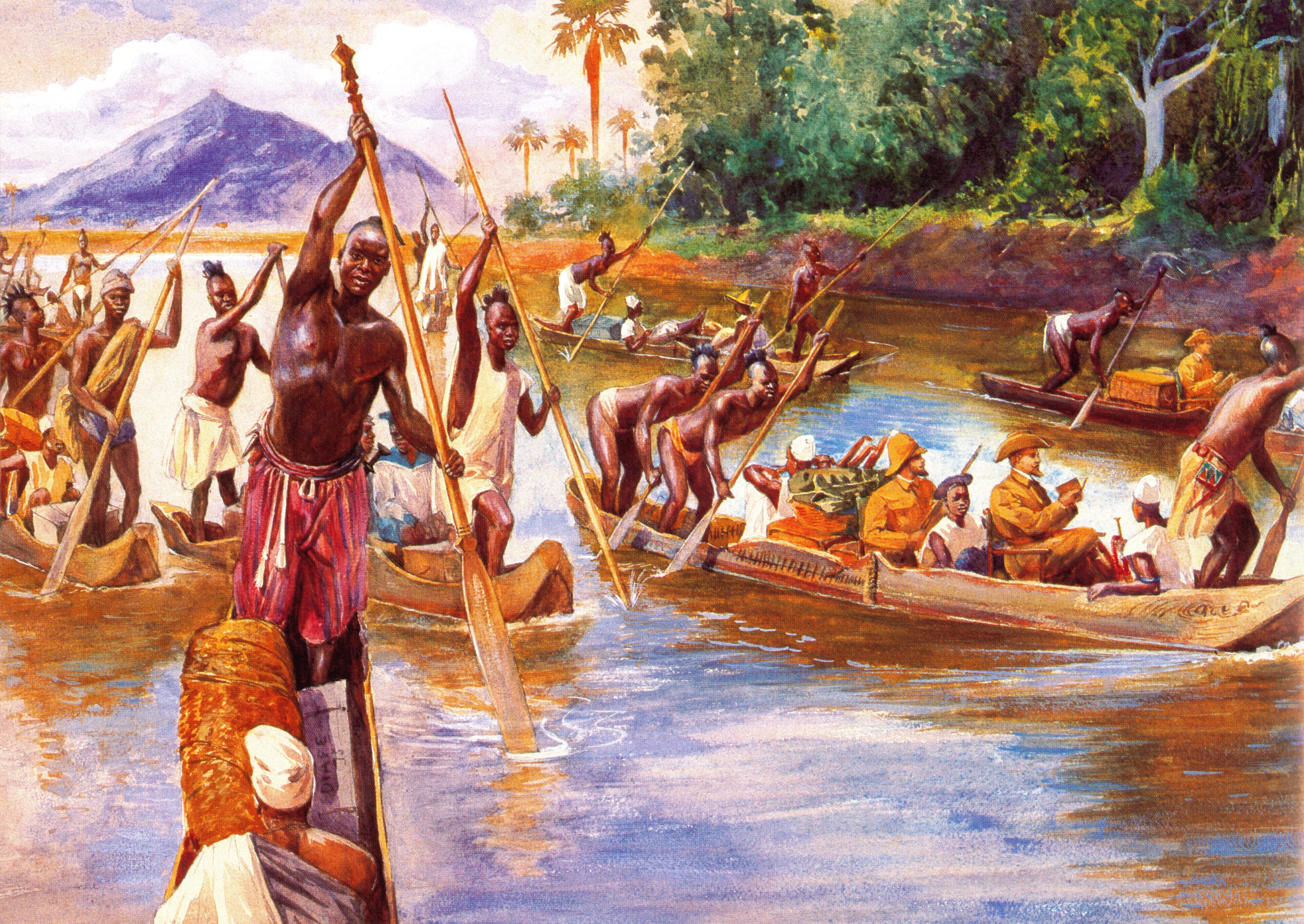
Depiction of the second expedition on the Benue River

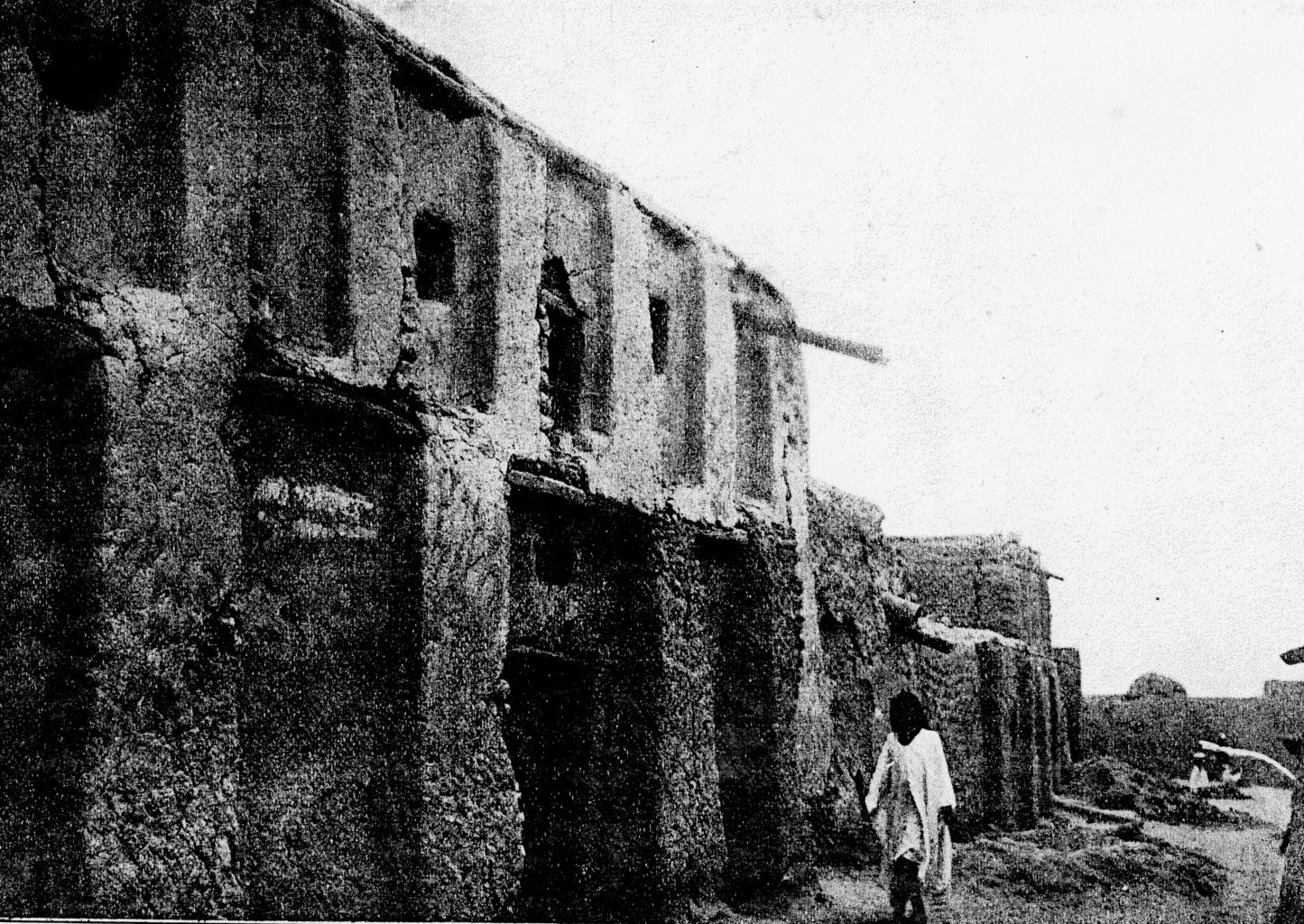
Photograph taken by Frobenius of a house in Timbuktu during the second expedition

The second expedition was funded by the German Colonial Office and supported by the City of Leipzig. It ran from 1907 to 1909 and primarily ran from Senegal through Niger and Liberia to Togo. Frobenius also visited Mali (including the ancient city of Timbuktu), Burkina Faso and the Ivory Coast. During the expedition Frobenius collected stories from the inhabitants and published some which were of an erotic nature, in a 1910 collection entitled Der Schwarze Dekameron (The Black Decameron).

== Third expedition ==
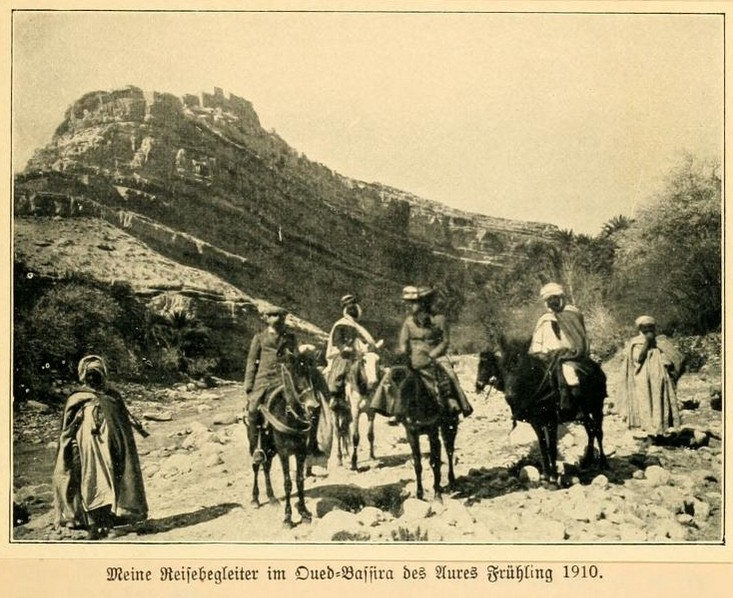
The third expedition at Oued-Bassira

The third expedition was carried out in 1910 to Northwest Africa. It visited Morocco, Algeria and Tunisia. Frobenius collected stories from the Berbers and carried out a study of the Kabyle people.

== Fourth expedition ==
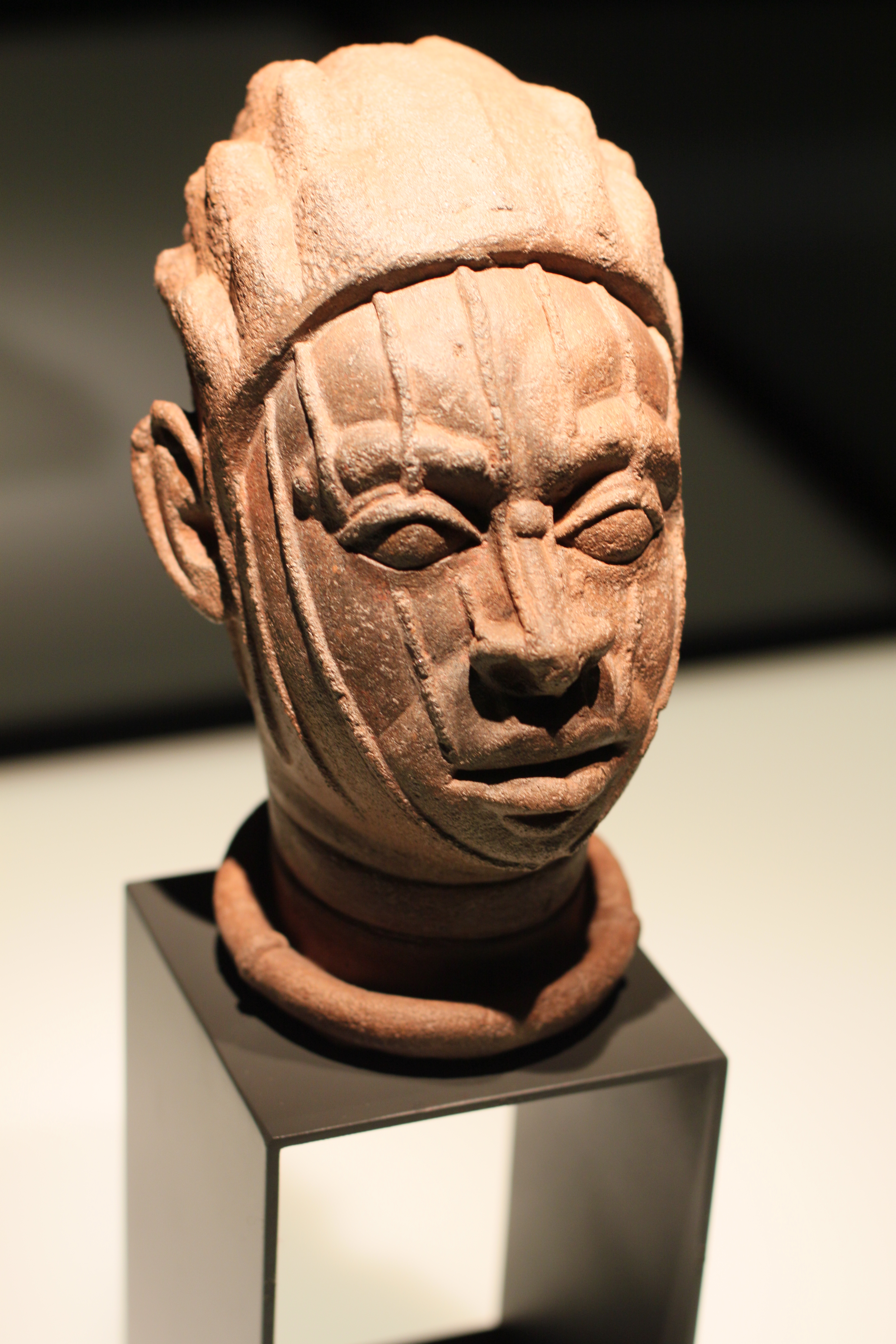
A terracotta head brought to Berlin by the fourth expedition

The fourth expedition visited Nigeria and Cameroon between 1910 and 1912. Frobenius carried out archaeological excavations at the ancient Yoruba city of Ife in Nigeria and published his findings in twelve volumes between 1921 and 1928. Frobenius theorised that the intricate bronze and terracotta sculptures he discovered at Ife were relics from the mythological city of Atlantis. However, later research has shown them to be the work of 12th-15th century AD Yoruba craftsmen.

== Fifth expedition ==
Frobenius led the 1912 fifth expedition to Kordofan in Anglo-Egyptian Sudan with the objective of locating the mines of Hophrat-en-Nahas in the Kingdom of Kush. The expedition travelled through Egypt via Suez and Port Sudan. Frobenius also visited Khartoum and El Obeid in Sudan. Upon returning to Germany he found his fame had earned him an audience with Wilhelm II (the German emperor) who agreed to sponsor his future expeditions.

== Sixth expedition ==
The sixth Frobenius expedition explored Algeria between 1912 and 1914. The expedition documented rock art from the Saharan region and in 1913 excavated ancient tombs on the Moroccan border.

== Seventh expedition ==
The seventh expedition was to Eritrea in 1915. It served as a front for a German military espionage mission to Ethiopia, and was intended to persuade Emperor Lij Iyasu to support the Central Powers in the First World War and provide assistance to an uprising in the Sudan. This could have threatened British and Italian colonies in Eastern Africa and possibly the vital supply route of the Suez Canal. The party crossed the Red Sea in a sambuk but were discovered by the Italian authorities soon after their arrival in Eritrea and had no opportunity to enter Ethiopia. Frobenius and the expedition were eventually granted safe passage to Italy.

== Eighth expedition ==
The eighth expedition travelled to the Nubian Desert in Sudan in 1926. Part of its work was to document rock art.

== Ninth expedition ==
The ninth expedition ran between August 1928 and March 1930 in Southern Africa. It visited parts of modern-day South Africa, Zimbabwe, Botswana, Lesotho, Mozambique, Namibia and Zambia. It recorded a large quantity of indigenous rock art, which helped Frobenius to build one of the most important collections of such work, some of which was sold to South African museums. It also investigated ancient ore mines and provided samples for some of the first metallographic and chemical analysis of southern African indigenous metals.

== Tenth expedition ==
The tenth Frobenius expedition was carried out in 1932 to Fezzan in Italian Libya. It started from Tripoli and part of the route was carried out by motor car procured through the German consul. The expedition returned to Rome by mid September.

== Eleventh expedition ==
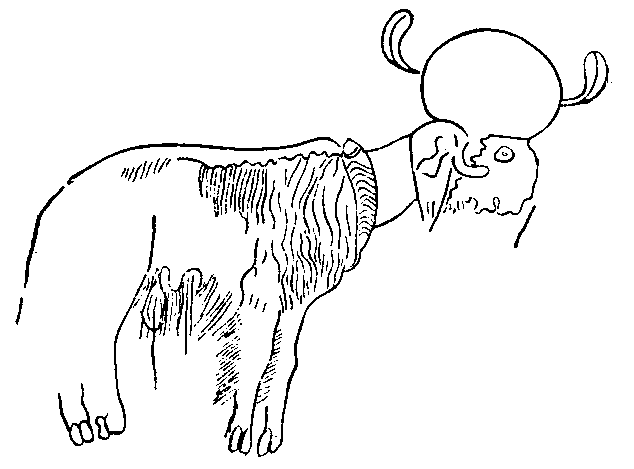
Frobenius' sketch of a rock engraving found in the Sahara desert during the eleventh expedition

The eleventh expedition was carried out in 1933 to the Libyan Desert.

== Twelfth expedition ==
The Twelfth German Inner Africa Research Expedition was carried out between 1934 and 1935 in the Emirate of Transjordan and the Ethiopian Empire. The expedition was led by Frobenius, though he did not accompany it - the leader of the field group was Jensen. This would be the last of the Frobenius Expeditions to Africa; though he would lead the "Frobenius Expedition I" to New Guinea in 1937-8 and the "Frobenius Expedition II" to Australia in 1938. He died in August 1938.

Jensen published the findings from the twelfth expedition as a book in 1936. He later took over the directorship of the Frobenius Institute.

== Thirteenth expedition ==
Jensen resumed the German Inner Africa Research Expeditions after the Second World War. Jensen struggled to raise money in war-devastated Frankfurt but managed to secure funding for an expedition to Ethiopia. Jensen led the expedition which took place between 1950 and 1952. Jensen's party included doctors Eike Haberland and Willy Schulz-Weidner; Haberland later also became a director of the Frobenius Institute.

== Fourteenth expedition ==
The final German Inner Africa Research Expedition was led by Jensen to Ethiopia between 1954 and 1955.

The institute undertook further expeditions to Ethiopia, though these were under a separate programme. The expeditions were halted in 1974 among political turmoil following the socialist takeover of Ethiopia. The institute's Ethiopian Studies department ceased to exist until re-established in 2010.
