= Augustus Henry Keane =

Irish journalist (1833–1912)

Augustus Henry Keane (1833–1912) was an Irish Roman Catholic journalist and linguist, known for his ethnological writings.

== Early life ==
He was born in Cork, Ireland. He was educated in Cork, Dublin and Jersey, and graduated at the Roman Catholic College, Dublin.

== In Glasgow ==
Keane was editor of the Glasgow Free Press from 1862. He and his deputy, Peter McCorry, turned the first Scottish Catholic newspaper into a campaigning sheet, setting the Irish priests against the Scottish priests, and in particular the vicars-apostolic. The paper supported the nationalist Patrick Lavelle, who used its pages to attack Paul Cullen. John Murdoch, the Vicar Apostolic of the Western District was another particular target, the background being the increasing number of Irish Catholic priests in Scotland, and an increasing Irish immigrant population. Keane and McCorry found themselves in court proceedings.

The policy of the Glasgow Free Press under Keane and then McCorry had only short-term direct effects, and the paper was shut down after the intervention by Cardinal Manning towards the end of the 1860s; but the divisions it revealed have been taken as important in the move towards restoring the Scottish Catholic hierarchy, which occurred in 1878. Keane may have drifted from the Catholic faith in later life.

== Linguist, geographer, ethnologist ==
He studied in Germany and taught at Hameln; and became a linguist. He taught languages including Hindustani at the Hartley Institute, Southampton; a chair of Hindustani was created for him at University College, London, in 1883, but he left it in 1885. He then spent a period lecturing on ethnology at the University of Virginia in Charlottesville, Virginia.

Keane belonged to the "philological" group of British linguists, with Richard Garnett, Thomas Hewitt Key, Isaac Taylor, John Horne Tooke and Hensleigh Wedgwood. He began attending meetings of the a Royal Anthropological Institute in 1879, read papers there, and became a Fellow, serving as vice-president. He was granted a Civil List pension in 1897. Keane was a Fellow of the Royal Geographical Society.

== Views ==
Keane's racial theories were published first in Nature in 1879–81. He affirmed the specific unity of human beings in his 1896 text Ethnology, even if his views had some other implications. He produced racial typologies in his expository writings; they were more systematic than those of John George Wood and Robert Brown, and were intended for rote learning.

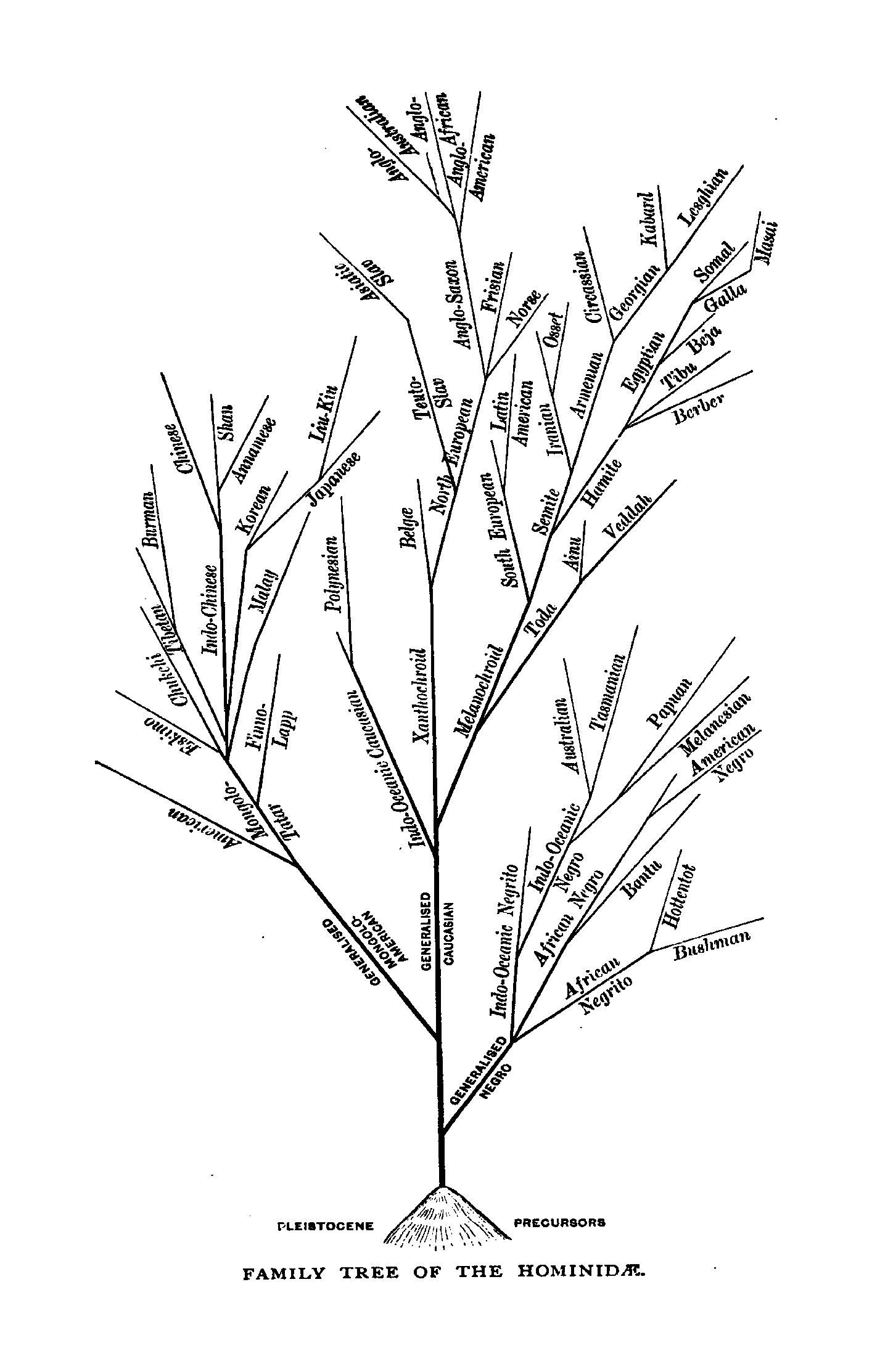
Evolutionary tree from Keane's Ethnology (1909)

Keane was out of step with the anthropology of the time, preferring linguistic data to that of physical anthropology and came to occupy a marginal position in the emerging scientific discipline. On the other hand, his efforts at popularising anthropology were praised by Sir Harry Johnston.

Keane's views were invoked by F. W. Bell in South Africa from 1908, with those of Robert Bennett Bean, and played a part in the move of the Transvaal Native Affairs Society towards a segregationist position. He was known for his sympathies displayed in The Boer States (1900), in which he attributed the long-term issue behind the Boer Wars to the attitude of Lord Glenelg in the 1830s. The stance taken by Keane, who has been described as a "virulent racist", was conveyed in person when he addressed the Transvaal Native Affairs Society in September 1909. He cited Robert Wilson Shufeldt of Virginia, author of The Negro a Menace to American Civilization (1907), aiding the Bell faction against the moderates around Howard Pim.

== Works ==
- Handbook of the History of the English Language (1875)
- Ethnology of the Egyptian Sudan (1884)
- Codex Fejrvry-Mayer: An Old Mexican Picture Manuscript in the Liverpool Free Public Museums (12014/M) with Joseph Florimond Loubat
- The Early Chartered Companies (A.D. 1296-1858) (1896, 2002 reprint), with George Cawston
- Man, Past and Present (1899); this work has been called "overtly racist", and a later edition was revised by Alison Hingston Quiggin and A. C. Haddon removed some of the extreme statements.
- Ethnology. In Two Parts: I. Fundamental Ethnical Problems. II. The Primary Ethnical Groups (1896)
- Asia: Northern and Eastern Asia, vol. 1; Asia: Southern and Western Asia, vol. 2 (1896)
- The Boer States: land and people (1900)
- The Gold of Ophir - Whence Brought and by Whom? (1901)
- The World's Peoples: A popular account of their bodily and mental characters

Translations

- Ancient Peruvian art: contributions to the archaeology of the empire of the Incas, translator, original by Arthur Baessler
- Philosophy Historical and Critical (1879), translator, original by André Lefèvre
- The Science of Language. Linguistics, Philology, Etymology, translator, original by Abel Hovelacque
- The Antichrist Legend; a chapter in Christian and Jewish folklore, translator, original by Wilhelm Bousset
- The Early Teutonic, Italian and French Masters (reprinted 2004), translator from the work of Robert Dohme
- The Chittagong Hill Tribes: results of a journey made in the year 1882 (1885), translator, original by Emil Riebeck
- Travels in Africa: During the years 1875-1878: Volume 1 (1890), translator, original by Wilhelm Junker
- Travels in Africa: During the years 1879-1883: Volume 2 (1891), translator, original by Junker
- Travels in Africa during the years 1882-1886: Volume 3 (1892), translator, original by Junker
- The Childhood of Man, translator, original by Leo Frobenius
- Diego Velazquez and His Times, translator, original by Carl Justi.

He contributed ethnological appendices to the volumes of Edward Stanford's Compendium of Geography and Travel, which was based on Friedrich von Hellwald's Die Erde und ihre Völker. An English edition of La Nouvelle Géographic universelle, la terre et les hommes, 19 vols. (1875—94) of Elisée Reclus appeared as The Earth and Its Inhabitants the first volumes were edited by Ernest George Ravenstein, the rest by Keane. With Sir Stanley Reed he edited Bradshaw's Through Routes to the Chief Cities of the World (1907).

A prolific author, Keane wrote encyclopedia articles, in particular for the Encyclopædia Britannica. His articles in the 9th edition (1875–89) included "Negro", which included details of the racial theory of Filippo Manetta., as well as articles on "Malay Peninsula", "Mexico (Republic of Mexico)", "Mexico (City of Mexico)", "Sudan" and "Yoruba. He also wrote magazine articles and textbooks; he contributed 800 entries to Cassell's Storehouse of General Information. In 1905, he was involved in the part publishing venture The Living Races of Man, illustrated with 800 photographs.
