= Quigg =

Surname

Quigg is a surname. Notable people with the surname include:

- Charles Quigg (1851–1909), American physician and politician
- Chris Quigg (born 1944), theoretical physicist at the Fermi National Accelerator Laboratory
- Doc Quigg (1911–1998), American journalist
- Eoghan Quigg (born 1992), Irish pop singer who appeared in The X Factor in 2008
- H. Gerald Quigg (born 1937), American fundraiser at the University of Richmond
- H. Leslie Quigg (1887–1980), American chief of police of Miami and member of the Ku Klux Klan indicted for the murder of a Black prisoner
- Joe Quigg, American basketball player
- Lemuel E. Quigg (1863–1919), United States Representative from New York
- Robert Quigg (1885–1955), Irish World War I recipient of the Victoria Cross
- Scott Quigg (born 1988), English professional boxer

== See also ==
- Eoghan Quigg (album), the debut studio album by Irish pop singer Eoghan Quigg
- Quigg Lawrence (born 1959), American Anglican bishop
- Quiggin
