= Charles Henry Monro =

English author, jurist and benefactor

Charles Henry Monro (1835–1908) was an English author, jurist and benefactor.

== Life ==
He was born in London, 17 March 1835, the second of three sons of Cecil Monro (1803–78) of Hadley, chief registrar of the Court of Chancery, son of John Monro and a descendant of Alexander Monro, principal of Edinburgh University 1685–90. Charles's mother was Cecil's wife Elizabeth (d. 1883), daughter of Colonel Henry Howe Knight-Erskine of Pittodrie. Charles's older brother, Cecil James, was incapacitated by phthisis soon after his election to a fellowship at Trinity in 1855. His younger brother, Kenneth, an artillery officer, died in early manhood of phthisis in Nova Scotia.

Monro entered Harrow in 1847, was Monitor in 1853, and proceeded to Gonville and Caius College, Cambridge, as Sayer scholar in 1853. He graduated B.A. in 1857 with a first class in classics and eighth Classic in his year. In the same year he was elected to a fellowship, which he resigned in 1897. Called to the bar at Lincoln's Inn in 1863, he did not practise, but continued his study of law, though the work was hampered by ill-health, necessitating much residence abroad. From 1872 to 1896 he was law lecturer at his college and at some point was appointed a member of the Syndicate of Modern Languages in the university, being a good linguist. In 1900 he represented Cambridge University at the 500th anniversary of the second foundation of the University of Cracow.

Monro died in Eastbourne on 23 February 1908, where he was buried.

== Works ==
Monro's published scholarship consisted mainly of translations which were for a long time the main translations of those texts in the English-speaking world, and are still referred to in twenty-first-century scholarship. In 1891 he published an annotated text and translation of the title 'Locati Conducti' in Justinian's Digest (a.k.a. Corpus Juris Civilis); in 1893 'De Furtis'; in 1896 'Ad legem Aquiliam'; in 1900 'De Acquirendo Dominio'; and in 1902 'Pro Socio.' Meanwhile, he had begun the task of translating the whole Digest. One volume of this work appeared in 1904 and another in 1909, after his death, covering, altogether, about one-fourth of the book, published by Cambridge University Press.

== Legacy ==
Monro was an accomplished linguist, and was specially interested in Celtic languages. By his will he left a large sum to his college, which perpetuated his memory by a Monro fellowship, a Monro lectureship in Celtic, a Monro endowment to the Squire law library in Cambridge, and a Monro extension to the college library.

The Monro lectureship was first held by Edmund Crosby Quiggin, and was a significant step in introducing formal Celtic teaching at Cambridge, now effected by the Department of Anglo-Saxon, Norse and Celtic.

== Sources and links ==
- Alexander Mackenzie, History of the Munros of Fowlis (Inverness: privately published, 1898), http://www.ebooksread.com/authors-eng/alexander-mackenzie/history-of-the-munros-of-fowlis-with-genealogies-of-the-principal-families-of-th-kca/page-38-history-of-the-munros-of-fowlis-with-genealogies-of-the-principal-families-of-th-kca.shtml.
- Charles Henry Monro (trans.), The Digest of Justinian, 2 vols (Cambridge: Cambridge University Press, 1904–8). Vol I: https://archive.org/details/digestjustinian00monrgoog
- Letters in the National Archives: http://www.nationalarchives.gov.uk/a2a/records.aspx?cat=074-acc1063&cid=0#0.

== Notes ==
Attribution

This article incorporates text from a publication now in the public domain: Lee, Sidney, ed. (1912). "Monro, Charles Henry". Dictionary of National Biography (2nd supplement). Vol. 2. London: Smith, Elder & Co.
