= Roland Hardenberg =

German professor

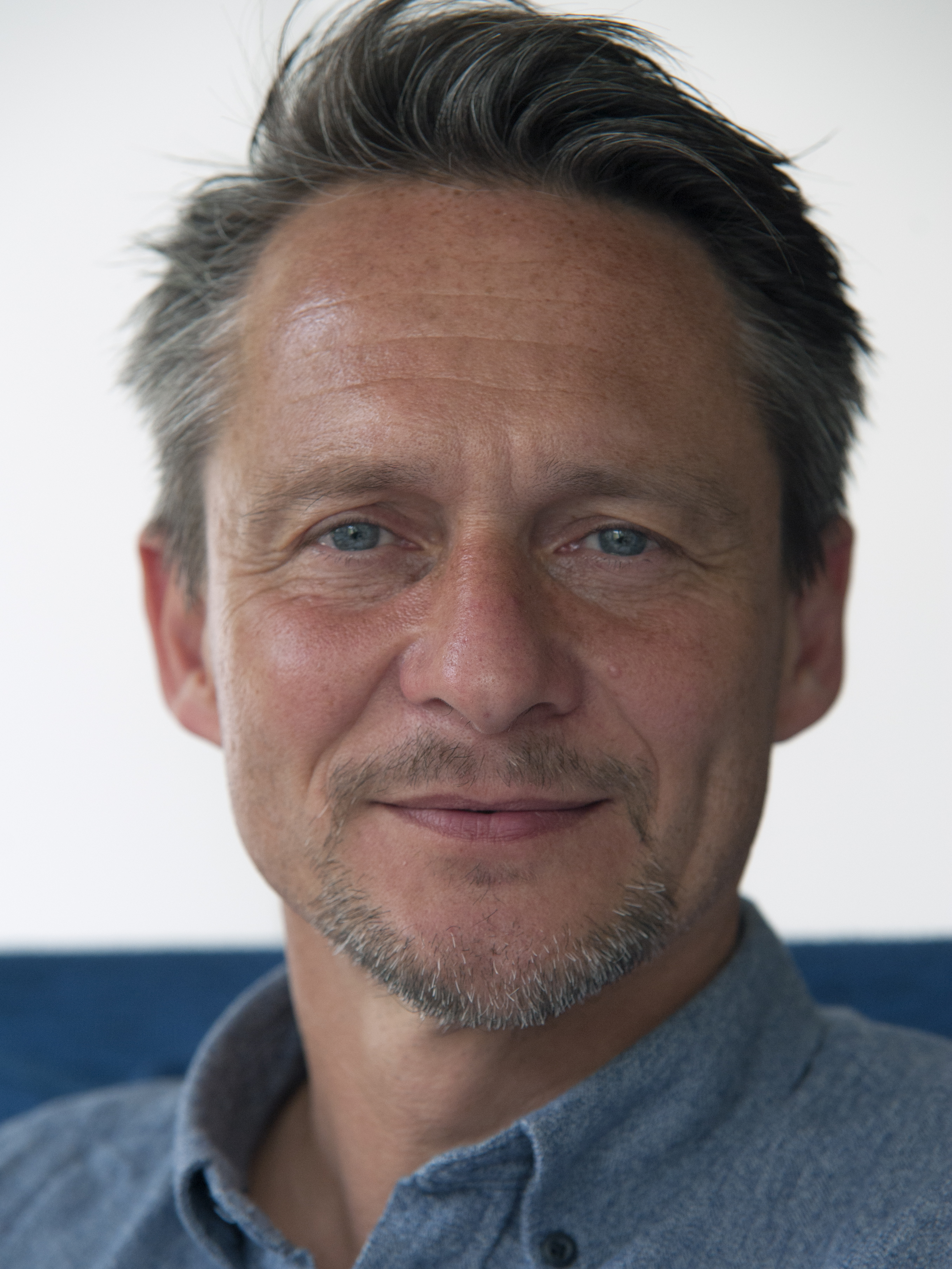
Roland Hardenberg

Roland Josef Hardenberg (born 1967 in Münster, Westphalia) is a German professor for Social and Cultural Anthropology. From 2009 to 2016 he was director of the Department of Ethnology at the Eberhard Karls University of Tübingen and from 2013 to 2017 deputy spokesperson of the CRC 1070 "ResourceCultures: Socio-cultural dynamics in the use of resources". In October 2016, he moved to a professorship for Social and Cultural Anthropology at the Goethe University Frankfurt am Main and took over as director of the Frobenius Institute in 2017. From 2017 to 2020, he was also managing director of the Institute for Ethnology at the Goethe University. Together with Holger Jebens he publishes the scientific journal Paideuma: Journal of Cultural Anthropology.

== Career ==
Hardenberg studied Ethnology, Modern History, Political Science and Southeast Asian Studies at the Westphalian Wilhelms University in Münster from 1988 to 1990 (Undergraduate), at Oxford Polytechnic (now Oxford Brookes University) from 1990 to 1991 (Diploma of Advanced Studies) and at the Free University of Berlin from 1991 to 1994 (Magister Artium). In 1998, he received his doctorate from the Free University of Berlin with a thesis on "The Rebirth of the Gods: Ritual and Society in Orissa" and was subsequently a research assistant in the Department of Ethnology.

In 2001, he moved to the South Asia Institute at the University of Heidelberg, where he continued as a research assistant until 2005. In 2006 he habilitated at the Westphalian Wilhelm University of Münster. The title of his habilitation thesis is "Children of the Earth Goddess: Society, Marriage and Sacrifice in the Highlands of Orissa". From 2006 to 2007, he was substitute professor at the Ethnological Institutes of the Free University of Berlin and the Eberhard Karls University of Tübingen. From 2007 to 2009 he headed the research project "Burial Cultures in Kyrgyzstan".

In 2009, he accepted the offer of a W3 professorship at the Department of Ethnology at the Eberhard Karls University of Tübingen, where he taught and headed the department until September 2016. In October 2016, he accepted the offer of a W3 professorship for ethnology at the Goethe University Frankfurt am Main and became the new director of the Frobenius Institute in January 2017, succeeding Karl-Heinz Kohl.

== Research ==
Hardenberg studies socio-cultural values that form the framework for social action. Based on ethnographic studies in India and Kyrgyzstan, his research aims at understanding local practices that are expressions of shared socio-cosmic ideas. In India and Kyrgyzstan, these include in particular religious practices such as rituals, sacrifices, pilgrimages and burials as well as exchanges that suggest specific conceptions of "kinship", "friendship", "neighborhood", etc. Hardenberg's approach is comparative, with the aim of understanding cultural differences and commonalities.

He works with techniques of empirical field research in the context of long-term stays mainly in rural areas of South and Central Asia. His systematic contributions to social and cultural anthropology include topics such as cultural comparison, gift exchange, hierarchy, house societies and 'New Kinship'. In the framework of a Collaborative Research Center (SFB 1070) at the University of Tübingen, Roland Hardenberg, together with other scholars, has developed cultural studies approaches to resources and elaborated concepts such as "resource complexes" and "resource cultures". Based on comparative studies of ritual economies, he has coined the term "socio-cosmic field".

His current research interests focus on processes in the handling (production, distribution and consumption) of different millet varieties and on the question of which factors contribute to the rise and decline of millet as a staple food in India and Africa.

== Field research ==
- 1995-1996: 14 months in Puri (Odisha, India)
- 2001-2003: 16 months in Rayagada (Odisha, India)
- 2007-2008: 12 months in Bishkek and Tosor (Kyrgyzstan)
- Various shorter research stays in Pakistan, Bangladesh, Iran and India.

== Publications (selection) ==
=== Monographs ===
- Hardenberg, Roland. Children of the Earth Goddess: Society, Marriage and Sacrifice in the Highlands of Odisha. De Gruyter, Berlin 2018 (paperback edition 2019).
- Hardenberg, Roland.The Renewal of Jagannatha’s Body. Ritual and Society in Orissa. (Überarbeitete, englische Übersetzung von R. Hardenberg, 1999, Die Wiedergeburt der Götter) Manak Publications, New Delhi 2011.
- Hardenberg, Roland. König ohne Reich: Rituale des Königtums in Orissa (Indien). (2. vollständig überarbeitete Auflage, 2000, Ideologie eines Hindu-Königtums) Schiler, Berlin 2008.

=== Editor ===
- Hardenberg, Roland und Jebens, Holger (eds.). Paideuma: Zeitschrift für kulturanthropologische Forschung / Journal of Cultural Anthropology Reimer Verlag (vor 2018: Kohlhammer). Annual Publication.
- Martin Bartelheim, Leonardo Garcia Sanjuán and Roland Hardenberg (eds.). Human-Made Environments. The Development of Landscapes as ResourceAssemblages. RessourcenKulturen Bd. 15. Tübingen: Tübingen University Press. 2021.
- Schnell, Christiane/Pfeiffer, Sabine/Hardenberg, Roland (Hrsg.). Gutes Arbeiten im digitalen Zeitalter. Frankfurt a. Main: Campus Verlag 2021.
- Hardenberg, Roland (ed.). Approaching Ritual Economy: Socio-Cosmic Fields in Globalized Contexts. SFB 1070 Publications, Tübingen 2016.
- Hardenberg, Roland (ed.). Asian World Views. Context and Structure. Journal of Social Sciences (special edition), 4/4, Delhi: Kamla Raj. 2000.
- Berger, Peter; Roland Hardenberg; Ellen Kattner & Michael Prager (eds.). An Anthropology of Values. Essays in honour of Georg Pfeffer. New Delhi: Pearson/Longman. 2010.
- Scholz, Anke K; Martin Bartelheim, Roland Hardenberg & Jörn Staecker (eds.), ResourceCultures. Sociocultural Dynamics and the Use of Resources – Theories, Methods, Perspectives. SFB Publications: Tübingen. 2017.
- Hardenberg, Roland & Holger Jebens (eds.). Paideuma: Zeitschrift für kulturanthropologische Forschung / Journal of Cultural Anthropology Reimer Verlag (vor 2018: Kohlhammer). Annual appearance.

=== Articles ===
- Hardenberg, Roland. Dwelling in an Animated Landscape. Forms of Attachment Between Environment and People in Eastern India. In: Martin Bartelheim, Leonardo Garcia Sanjuán and Roland Hardenberg (eds.), Human-Made Environments. The Development of Landscapes as ResourceAssemblages (RessourcenKulturen Bd. 15). Tübingen: Tübingen University Press. 2021: 23-34.
- Hardenberg, Roland. Arbeit als Daseinsgestaltung. Ethnologische Perspektiven auf Mensch-Ding-Beziehungen und soziokosmische Felder. In: Schnell, Christiane/Pfeiffer, Sabine/Hardenberg, Roland (Hrsg.), Gutes Arbeiten im digitalen Zeitalter. Frankfurt a. Main: Campus Verlag 2021: 45-64.
- Conrad, Ruth/Hardenberg, Roland. Religious Speech as Resource. International Journal of Practical Theology 24(1), 2020: 165-195.
- Hardenberg, Roland/Berger, Peter. Georg Pfeffer (1943-2020). Paideuma: Zeitschrift für kulturanthropologische Forschung / Journal of Cultural Anthropology 65, 2020: 331-345.
- Berger, Peter & Roland Hardenberg. “Cereal Belongings – a cultural perspective on cereals as resource.” In: Paideuma: Zeitschrift für kulturanthropologische Forschung / Journal of Cultural Anthropology 64: 2018: 167–181.
- Hardenberg, Roland. “‘Imperial rice‘ and ‚subaltern millets‘. Cereals as resources in Odisha (India) and beyond.” In: Paideuma: Zeitschrift für kulturanthropologische Forschung / Journal of Cultural Anthropology 64: 2018: 265–283.
- Hardenberg, Roland, “Dongria Kond: Perspectivism in Tribal India”, in: Brill’s Encyclopedia of the Religions of the Indigenous People of South Asia Online, Marine Carrin (Editor-in-Chief), Michel Boivin, Gérard Toffin, Paul Hockings, Raphaël Rousseleau, Tanka Subba, Harald Lambs-Tyche (Section Editors). <http://dx.doi.org/10.1163/2665-9093_BERO_COM_031977>
- Hardenberg, Roland. Sacrifice, in: International Encyclopedia of Anthropology, ed. H. Callan, Vol. 12 (ed. By Simon Coleman). Wiley-Blackwell. doi:10.1002/9781118924396.wbiea2258 2018.
- Hardenberg, Roland. “From Durkheim to Hocart: Sacred Resources and the Quest for ‘life’.” In: Durkheimian Studies / Etudes Durkheimiennes 23:, 2017: 40–56.
- Bartelheim, Martin; Roland Hardenberg & Joern Staecker. The ‚Resource Turn‘: A Socio-Cultural Perspective on Resources, in: A. K. Scholz, M. Bartelheim, R. Hardenberg and Jörn Staecker (eds.), ResourceCultures. Sociocultural Dynamics and the Use of Resources – Theories, Methods, Perspectives. SFB Publications: Tübingen. 2017: 13–24.
- Hardenberg, Roland. Beyond Economy and Religion. Resources and Socio-cosmic Fields in Odisha, India. Religion and Society: Advances in Research 7, 2016: 83–96.
- Hardenberg, Roland. Those who spread from one father”: The Cultural Elaboration of Segmentation and Inclusion in Kïrgïzstan, in: L. Prager/M. Prager/G. Sprenger (eds.), Parts and Wholes. Essays on Social Morphology, Cosmology, and Exchange in Honour of J. D. M. Platenkamp. Zürich: Lit Verlag. 2016: 105–124.
- Hardenberg, Roland. Three Dimensions of Liminality in the context of Kyrgyz Death Rituals, in: P. Berger/J. Kroesen (eds.), Ultimate Ambiguities Investigating Death and Liminality. New York & Oxford: Berghahn Books. 2015: 125–146.
- Hardenberg, Roland. Collective, communicative and cultural memories: examples of local historiography from northern Kyrgyzstan. Central Asian Survey (Special issue: Local History as an Identity Discipline) 3/31, 2012: 265–276.
- Hardenberg, Roland. Die kulturelle Gestaltung des Todes in nicht-westlichen Gesellschaften. Berliner Theologische Zeitschrift (Bestattungskultur in der Gegenwart) 2/2012, 2012: 335–359.
- Hardenberg, Roland. The Efficacy of Funeral Rituals in Kyrgyzstan. Journal of Ritual Studies 24/1, 2010: 29–43.
- Hardenberg, Roland. Reconsidering ‚tribe‘, ‚clan‘ and ‚relatedness‘: A comparison of social categorization in Central and South Asia. Scrutiny: A Journal of International and Pakistan Studies 1/ 1, 2009: 37–62.
- Hardenberg, Roland. Categories of Relatedness: Rituals as a Form of Classification in a Middle Indian Society. Contributions to Indian Sociology 43/1, 2009: 61–87.
