= Karin Hahn-Hissink =

German ethnologist

- Born: Karin Hissink; 4 November 1907; Berlin, Germany
- Died: 23 May 1981 (aged 73); Kronberg im Taunus, Germany
- Occupation: anthropologist
- Years active: ca. 1930–1970

Karin Hahn-Hissink (4 November 1907 – 23 May 1981) was a German anthropologist whose research on the mythology of peoples living in the eastern lowlands of Bolivia is considered an important contribution to the field. For a quarter of a century, she was a curator at the Frankfurt Ethnological Museum (now the Museum of World Cultures), and she also worked at the Frobenius Institute.

== Early life and education ==
Karin Hissink was born in Berlin to Hertha Hissink, who came from a wealthy German family. Her father, Jack Hissink, was Dutch and worked for AEG. She had a brother, Jan. In her youth, she was a member of a women's group of glider pilots. She lost her entire family during World War II.

Hissink studied archaeology and ethnology at LMU Munich (Germany), at the University of Lausanne (Switzerland), and at the Humboldt University of Berlin (Germany). She wrote her doctoral dissertation on the use of masks as facade decorations on ancient buildings of the Yucatan Peninsula in Mexico. She obtained her doctorate in 1933 from Frederick William University and then worked for a year as a volunteer at an Ethnological Research Institute that was affiliated with the Ethnological Museum of Berlin.

== Career ==
In 1934, Hissink moved to Frankfurt, where she took positions at the Institute for Cultural Morphology (renamed the Frobenius Institute in 1938) and the Ethnological Museum (now the Museum of World Cultures). Over the next two years, she took part in the last of the twelve research expeditions to Africa led by German archaeologist Leo Frobenius that collected ethnographic data and objects and documented rock art.

During World War II, Hissink effectively ran the Frobenius Institute as many of its male staff members were away on military service, and she was the wartime director of the Ethnological Museum (1940–1945). The institute was destroyed by bombing, but most of its holdings were saved, and for a time it was housed in Hissink's own apartment.

After the war, from 1947 to 1972, Hissink was a curator at the Ethnological Museum. In the early 1950s, she spent two years doing field research in the then little-studied eastern lowlands of Bolivia, and this work is considered an important contribution to cultural anthropology. She focused on the mythology of the Chama, Chimane, and Tacana peoples . Her compilation of nearly 400 Tacana myths is the largest collection of myths that has been published about any South American ethnic group. She also brought back some 300 objects from these trips that are still in the collection of the World Cultures Museum. She did further research in the central American countries of Mexico, Honduras, and Costa Rica.

She died in 1981 in Kronberg im Taunus, a town near Frankfurt. Her papers are housed at the Frobenius Institute.

== Publications ==
=== Solo authored ===
- Hissink, Karin. Masken als Fassadenschmuck: Untersucht an alten Bauten der Halbinsel Yukatan. Leipzig: Heitz & Cie, 1934.
- Hissink, Karin. Die allgemeine Amerikaabteilung des Völkermuseums. Frankfurt am Main, 1939.
- Hissink, Karin. Die Tacama. Erzählungsgut. Ergebnisse der Frobenius-Expedition nach Bolivien 1952-1954 (Volume 1). Stuttgart, 1961.
- Hahn-Hissink, Karin. Volkskunst in Mexiko. Frankfurt am Main: Städtisches Museum für Völkerkunde, 1968.
- Hahn-Hissink, Karin. Felsbilder Mexicos: Als historische, religiöse und Kunstdenkmäler. Berlin: Reimer, 1969.
- Hahn-Hissink, Karin. Volkskunst aus Guatemala. Frankfurt am Main: Städtisches Museum für Völkerkunde, 1971.

=== Coauthored ===
- Hahn-Hissink, Karin, and Albert Hahn. Die Tacana II: Daten zur Kulturgeschichte. Wiesbaden: Franz Steiner Verlag, 1984.
- Hahn-Hissink, Karin, and Albert Hahn. Chama-Indianer: Daten zur Kulturgeschichte. Wiesbaden: Franz Steiner Verlag, 1988.
- Hahn-Hissink, Karin, and Albert Hahn. Chimane: Notizen und Zeichnungen aus Nordost-Bolivien. Wiesbaden: Franz Steiner Verlag, 1989.

== Personal life ==
In 1937, Hissink met the painter Albert Hahn, her future husband and later collaborator. Following their marriage in 1966, she took the hyphenated surname Hahn-Hissink by which she is now generally known.
