= Edmund Crosby Quiggin =

British linguist and scholar (1875–1920)

- Born: 23 August 1875
- Died: 4 January 1920 (aged 44)
- Occupation: Irish linguist

Edmund Crosby Quiggin (23 August 1875 – 4 January 1920) was a British linguist and scholar. Born in Cheadle, Staffordshire, he was educated at Kingswood School in Bath. In 1893 he matriculated at Gonville and Caius College, Cambridge, to read Modern and Medieval Languages. He graduated with first-class honours. The fellows of Caius included the lawyer and legal historian Charles Henry Monro, who spoke Irish and encouraged Quiggin to study in this area.

In October 1898, Quiggin was appointed English Lector at the University of Greifswald, where he completed his doctorate, Die lautliche Geltung der vortonigen Wörter und Silben in der Book of Leinster Version der Tain bo Cualnge ('The phonetic quality of pre-stress words and syllables in the Book of Leinster version of the Táin Bó Cúailnge '). In 1901, Quiggin returned to Cambridge and between June 1903 and January 1906 went on to undertake fieldwork on Ulster Irish in County Donegal, resulting in the book A Dialect of Donegal.

In 1907, Quiggin married the anthropologist Alison Hingston Quiggin, author of A Survey of Primitive Money and other works.

In 1909 Caius College used a bequest of Monro to create the Monro Lectureship in Celtic for Quiggin. This lectureship was the first of its kind and one of the forces which fed into the creation of the Department of Anglo-Saxon, Norse and Celtic. (The department has, since 1993, commemorated Quiggin through the Quiggin Memorial Lecture, in which series the fullest biography of Quiggin so far has been published.)

Quiggin's next publication was his Prolegomena to the Study of the Later Irish Bards, 1200–1500. He was a soldier 1915 to 1919, first in Boulogne in World War I and then in the Admiralty's Intelligence Division. In 1919 he returned to work and study at Cambridge. He died from ill health on 4 January 1920 in Warlingham.
