= Alison Hingston Quiggin =

British anthropologist

Alison Hingston Quiggin (1874—1971) was a British anthropologist at the University of Cambridge and the author of the much reprinted A Survey of Primitive Money: The Beginnings of Currency (London, 1949).

== Education and career ==
Hingston studied at Newnham College, Cambridge, from 1899 to 1902. This school was founded in 1870, which was just 29 years before she attended. She went on to become a lecturer in the Department of Geography at Cambridge University.

== Personal life ==
As a student she founded the secret Leaving Sunday Dinner Society (LSDS), members of which would on Sunday evenings cook for one another in a rented room off the college grounds, where they could smoke and otherwise ignore college rules. Of the idea that young women at the university were there to find husbands, she later said "We didn't take much interest in the men and they were certainly terrified of us." Later, in 1907, she married the linguist Edmund Crosby Quiggin.

== Publications ==
A Survey of Primitive Money (first edition 1949) is considered her classic work; she argued that money arose as a tool for tracking and managing debt, not facilitating barter, as sometimes claimed. She also authored Primeval Man: The Stone Age in Western Europe (Macdonald and Evans, 1912), Trade Routes, Trade, and Currency in East Africa (Rhodes-Livingstone Museum, 1949), and was a contributor to the 14th edition of the Encyclopædia Britannica (1929–30).

She also collaborated with Alfred Cort Haddon on his History of Anthropology (London, 1910) and on the revision of Augustus Henry Keane's Man, Past and Present (Cambridge University Press, 1920; first edition 1899), and later wrote his biography, Haddon the Head-Hunter (Cambridge University Press, 1942).
