= Frobenius Institute =

German anthropology research institute

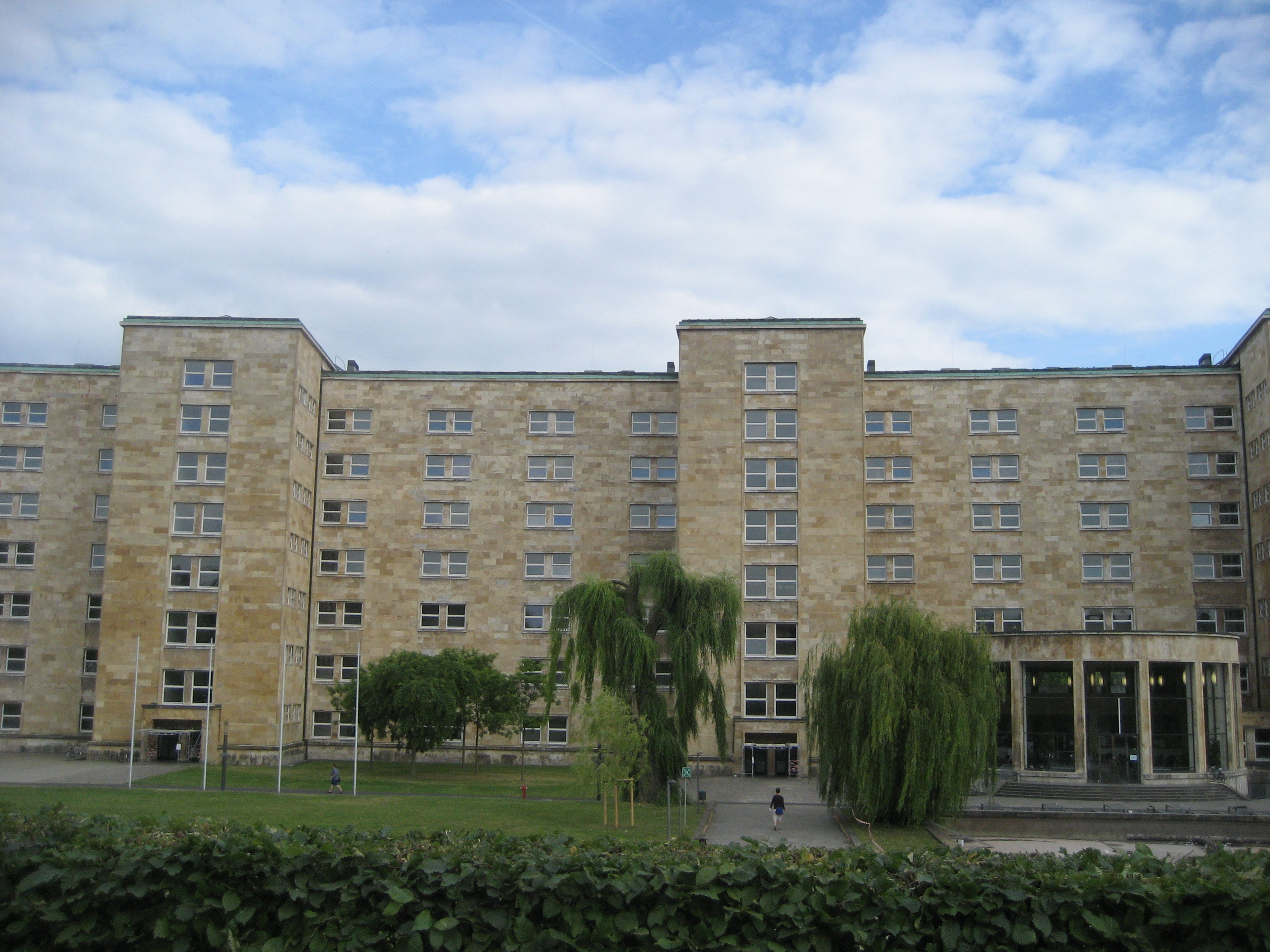
IG Farben Building in Frankfurt, where the Frobenius Institute is located

The Frobenius Institute (Frobenius-Institut; originally: Forschungsinstitut für Kulturmorphologie) is Germany's oldest anthropological research institute. Founded in 1925, it is named after Leo Frobenius. The institution is located at Gruneburgplatz 1 in Frankfurt am Main. An autonomous organization, it is associated with the Johann Wolfgang Goethe University, and works in collaboration with two other organizations, the Institut für Ethnologie, and the Museum der Weltkulturen. It carries out ethnological and historical research.

== History ==
The institute was founded in 1898 as the Stiftung Afrika Archiv (Foundation Africa Archive) in Berlin. In 1920 it moved to Munich as the Forschungsinstitut für Kulturmorphologie (Research Institute for Cultural Morphology). Since 1925, it has been affiliated with the Goethe University Frankfurt.

In 1934, Leo Frobenius undertook an extensive research expedition to Africa, recruiting the artist Alf Bayrle. The aim of the expedition was to document "old Africa" as comprehensively and systematically as possible. The resulting images are of scientific and artistic significance, and had a major influence on the Bayrle's later work and the perception of African culture.

The institute was renamed the Frobenius-Institut by Adolf Ellegard Jensen, its director after the 1938 death of Frobenius.

During the second world war, anthropologist Karin Hahn-Hissink was acting director of the institute, as most of her male colleagues had been drafted. Frobenius' successors as institute director were, from 1946 until 1965 Adolf Ellegard Jensen, from 1965 to 1966 Carl A. Schmitz, from 1968 to 1992 Eike Haberland, from 1996 to 2016 Karl-Heinz Kohl, and since 2017 Roland Hardenberg.

On November 11, 1961, the last day of his state visit to Germany, the Senegalese President Léopold Sédar Senghor was received by Adolf Ellegard Jensen at the Frobenius Institute and awarded the Leo Frobenius Medal, which was introduced for this occasion, for his engagement in Frobenius' life's work. The medal was awarded once more in 1964 to Jensen himself on the occasion of his retirement.

Well-known employees of the institute were Maria Weyersberg, Hans Rhotert, Ewald Volhard, Heinz Wieschhoff, and Christian Feest.

== Tasks and activities ==
The institute focuses on ethnological and historical research in Africa, but also covers the regions of South and Southeast Asia, Australia, South and North America, and Oceania. Current projects concentrate on cultural changes brought about by globalisation. The institute also awards an annual research grant for outstanding dissertations on ethnological or cultural studies topics. The Frobenius Institute also organises the annual Jensen Memorial Lecture, during which renowned scientists from abroad are invited to give lectures for one summer semester. The lecture series is financially supported by the Hahn-Hissink Frobenius Foundation and the Frobenius Society.

== Collection ==
The Frobenius Institute is famous for its collections, which are the results of collection and documentation activities that began with the founding of the Africa Archive and continued after Leo Frobenius' death in 1938. Apart from 6000 ethnographic objects, the collection mainly consists of around 100,000 pictures (photographs and watercolour paintings). Most of these pictures are available online on the website of the institute. In addition to the image archive, which contains photos from research expeditions as well as drawings and copies of rock paintings, the institute has an estate archive that houses the estates of the institute's founder, former directors and scientific staff. The Frobenius Institute also houses the Ethnological Library. With approximately 135,000 volumes today, it is the oldest and most comprehensive ethnological library in the German-speaking world. The institute's rock art collection was unanimously nominated in November 2021 by the German Nomination Committee for the UNESCO Memory of the World Programme. A decision on its recognition is expected in 2026 in Paris.

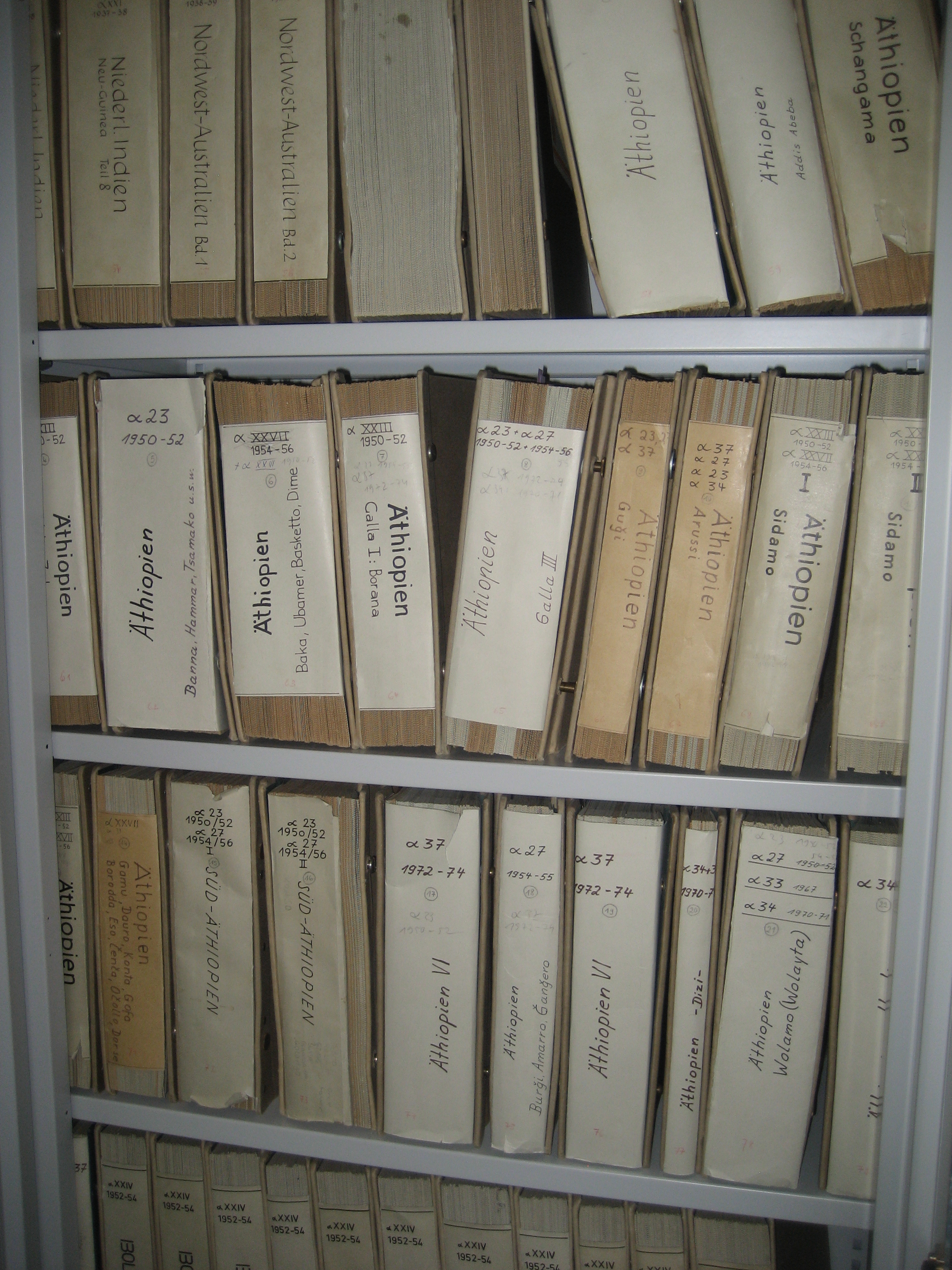
Collection Frobenius Institute (Frankfurt)

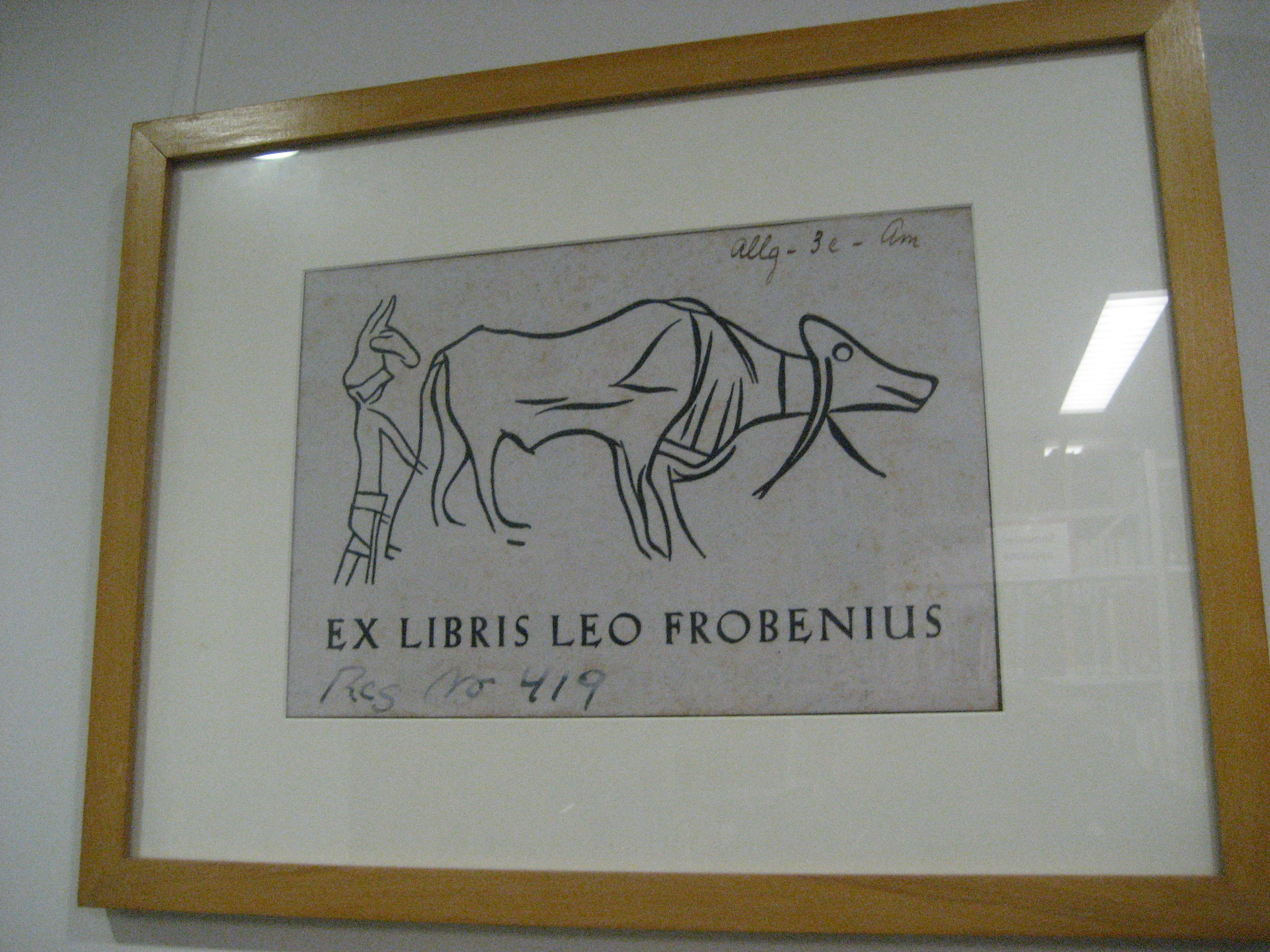
Ex Libris Leo Frobenius

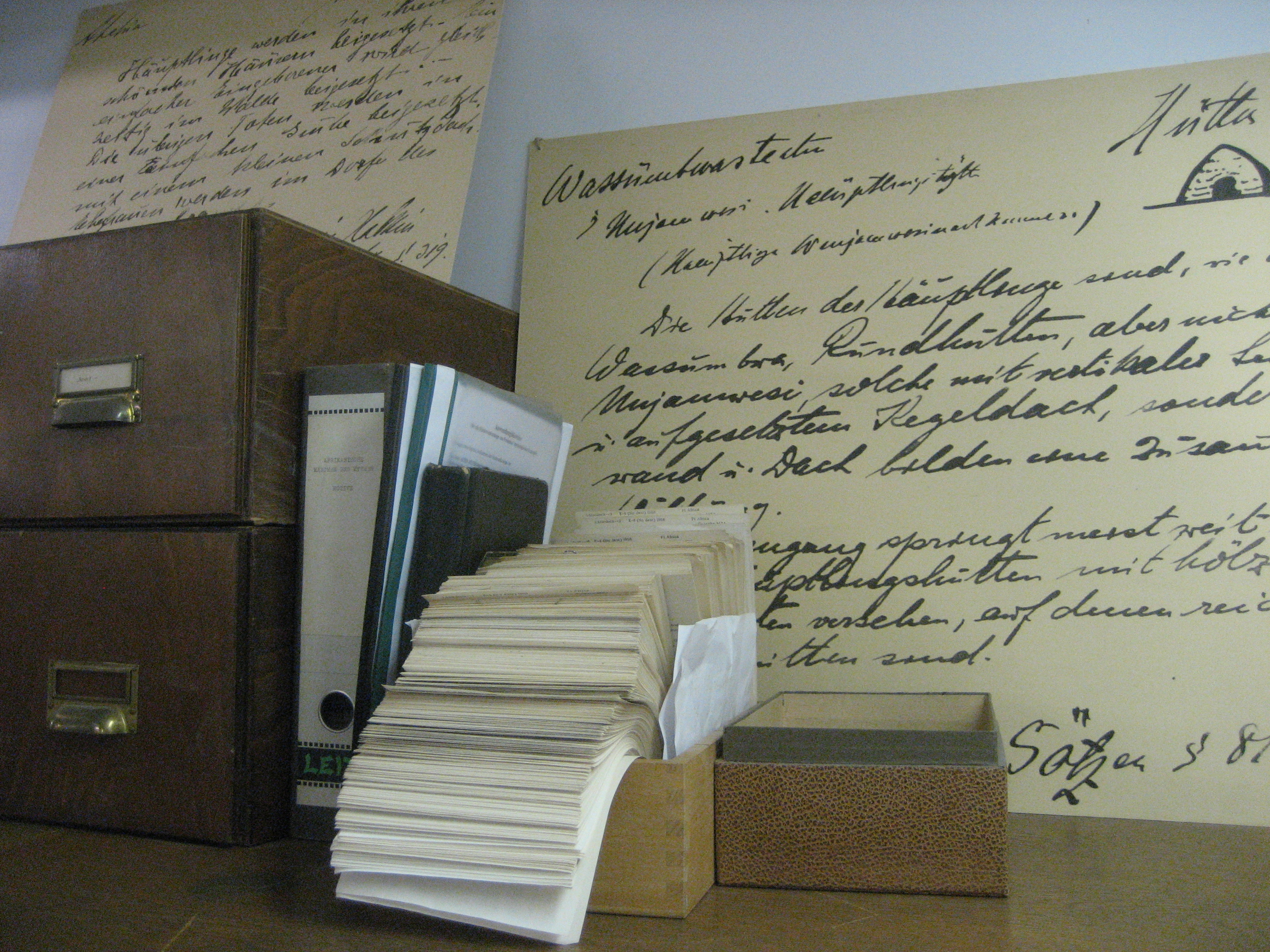
Collection Frobenius

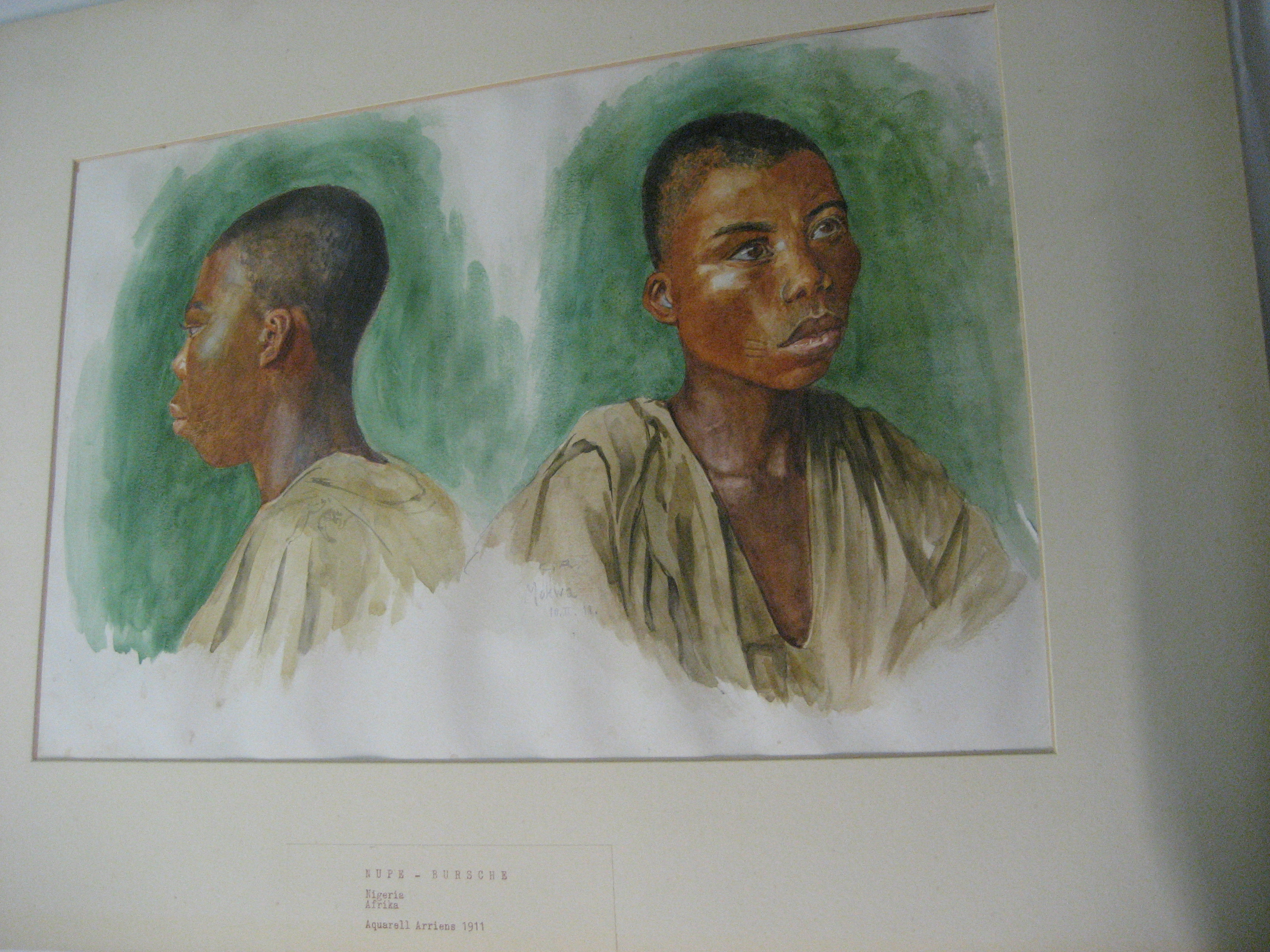
"Nupe boy, Nigeria"
(watercolour by Carl Arriens, 1911)

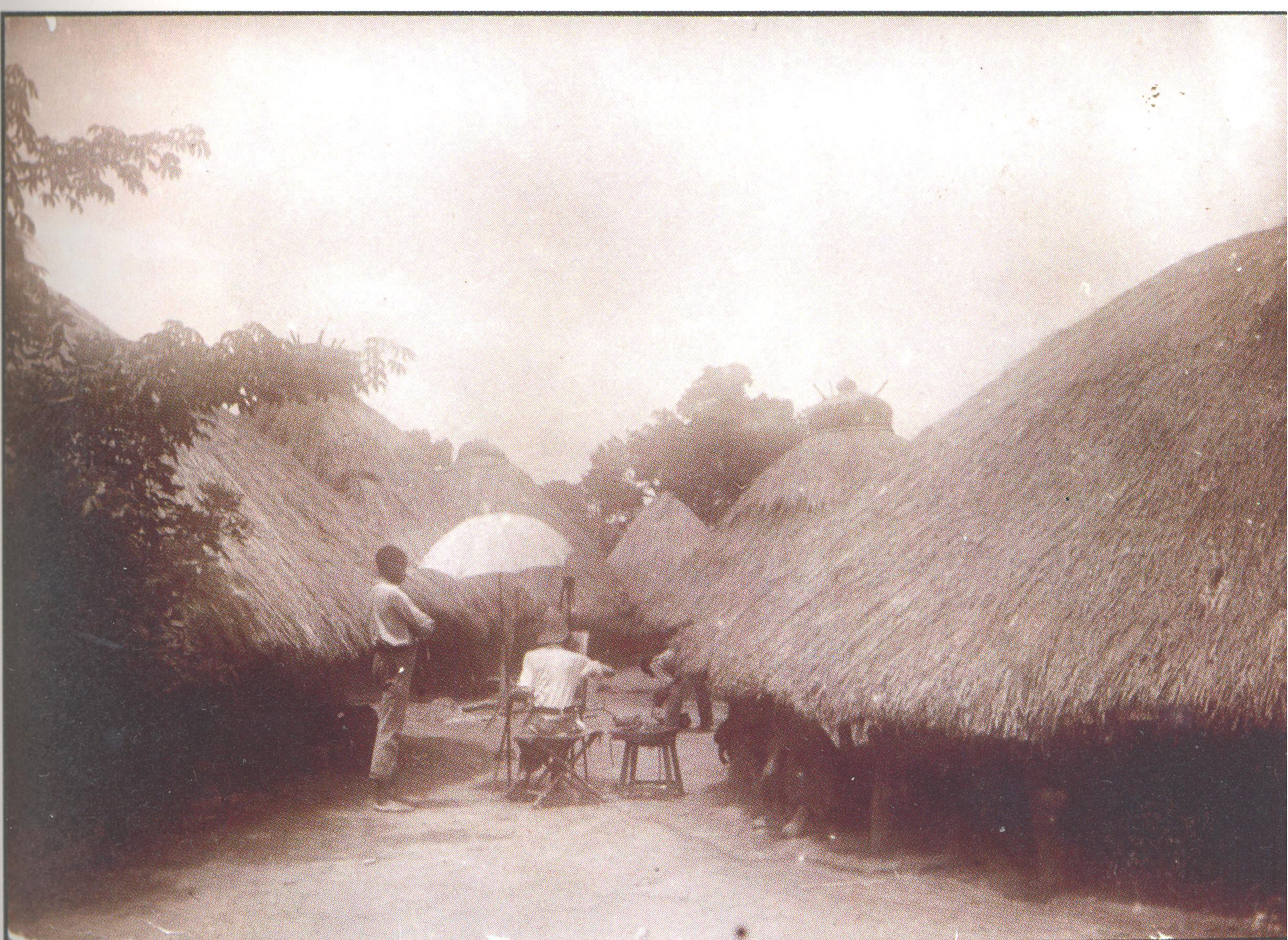
Carl Arriens in Benue Region, Nigeria (1911) (Photo Leo Frobenius)

== Literature ==
- Das Frobenius-Institut an der Johann Wolfgang Goethe-Universität. 1898-1998. Vorwort: Karl-Heinz Kohl. Frankfurt am Main, Frobenius Institut, 1998
