= List of Saharan explorers =

Although human settlements around and in the oases of the Sahara have existed for millennia, a relatively small number of explorers have recording traversing the entire desert due to its inhospitable nature and vastness. According to Herodotus, the Nasamones, a nomadic Berber tribe living in what is now Libya, sent five sons of chieftains to explore the desert. Below is a partial list of explorers whose travels across the Sahara are recorded and known in the present day.

== Notable explorers ==
- Herodotus born c. 484 BC. Herodotus in his Histories mentions the Garamantes of Libya.
- Al Idrisi (1100–1166) born in Ceuta. Wrote a medieval geography The Book of Roger.
- Ibn Battuta (1304–1369) [1349-53]. Born at Tangier in 1304.
- Leo Africanus (1485–1554) born in Granada and died in Tunis. Educated in Fez, he travelled widely in Africa.
- Major Daniel Houghton (1740–1791) [1790-91].
- Mungo Park (1771–1806) [1795-96].
- Friedrich Hornemann (1772–1801) [1798-1800].
- William George Browne
- Mungo Park (1771–1806) [1805-06].
- Joseph Ritchie (?-1818) & George Lyon (1795–1832) [1818]. Travelled from Tripoli to Murzuk.
- Major Alexander Gordon Laing (1793–1826) [1825-26].
- René Caillié (1799–1838) [1827-28]. Left from Sierra Leone for Timbuktu.
- Dixon Denham (1786–1828), Clapperton (1788–1827) & Walter Oudney (1786–1828) {+ Adolf Overweg (1813–1852)} [1822-25]. They became the first Europeans to see Lake Chad.
- Hugh Clapperton (1788–1827) & Richard Lander (1804–1834) [1825-27].
- Richard Lander (1804–1834) & John Lander (1807–1839) [1832-34].
- John Davidson (1797–1836) [1836].
- James Richardson (?-1851) (with Barth & Overweg) [1845-51].
- Heinrich Barth (1821–1865) [1850-55].
- Eduard Vogel (1829–1856) [1853-54].
- Henri Duveyrier (1840–1892) [1859]. Travelled to El Goléa and then the Tassili. Published The Tuareg of the North.
- Friedrich Gerhard Rohlfs (1831–1896) [1862-65, 1867–81]. Travelled in Morocco. Went from Tafilalt to Ghadames and Tripoli. Finally crossed to Lagos via Murzuk and Lake Chad.
- Alexine Tinne (1839–1869) [1869]. Travelled in Algeria and Tunisia.
- Gustav Nachtigal (1834–1885) [1870-74].
- Paul-Xavier Flatters (1832–1881) [1880–81].
- Pere Charles de Foucauld (1858–1916) [1881]. Widely travelled in Morocco.
- Oskar Lenz (1848–1925) [1879–80, 1885–87].
- Fernand Foureau (1850–1914) [1898–1900].
- Angus Buchanan (1886–1954) [1919–1923]. Among other travels, led two expeditions into the Aïr_Mountains of Niger, collecting birds and mammals for the museum of his then patron, Walter_Rothschild,_2nd_Baron_Rothschild. On the second expedition (1922–3), he was initially accompanied by Francis_Rodd,_2nd_Baron_Rennell (1895–1978), then continued north across the Sahara to Touggourt in northern Algeria. On his return produced a popular film, 'Crossing the Great Sahara', shot by companion, T A Glover, and went on to record the 3500-mile voyage in 'Sahara' (Murray, 1926). In the same year Francis Rodd's 'The People of the Veil' was published (Macmillan, 1926), becoming the definitive study of the Aïr Tuareg in English.
- Ahmed Hassanein Egyptian courtier to King Fouad of Egypt who travelled with his camel caravan 2200 miles deep into the Libyan Desert. His 1923 expedition corrected Rohlfs map and added to scientific knowledge of the area and discovered the rock art of Oweinat. His famous article in the September 1924 issue of National Geographic Magazine featured many photos of the region's people and landscapes.
- Prince Kamal el Dine Hussein (1874–1932). Discovered the unknown Gilf_Kebir plateau in 1925 using Citroen half-track vehicles.
- Ralph Bagnold (1896–1990). Led some of the earliest motor explorations of the Libyan_Desert using Model-T Fords and other 2WD vehicles which helped establish many of the techniques of desert driving still used today.
- László Almásy (1895–1951). Hungarian-born contemporary of Bagnold's and friend of Kamal el Dine, who also explored the Libyan desert in the 1930s. Basis of the fictional titular character in The English Patient.
- Georges Marie Haardt (1884–1932) and Louis Audouin-Dubreuil (1887–1960) [1921–1922; 1924–1925]. The first crossing of the Sahara by motor car (Citroën half-tracked vehicles). Followed by a crossing of the continent ending in Madagascar.
- Théodore Monod (1902–2000). French naturalist, humanist and scholar who completed several solo camel expeditions in the Majabat al Koubra, where he discovered the Ma'adin Ijafen archaeological site.
- Michael Asher (1953–) and Mariantonietta Peru (1956–) The first crossing of the Sahara from west to east by camel and on foot, from Chinguetti, Mauritania to Abu Simbel, Egypt a total distance of 4500 miles. (1986–87)
- Bill Kennedy Shaw travelled on Bagnold's 1930s expeditions and later joined the Long Range Desert Group
- Charles-Jacques Poncet - Wikidata Q6594681

== See also ==
- Desert exploration
- European exploration of Africa
- Trans-Saharan trade
