= Operation Salam =

World War II intelligence operation

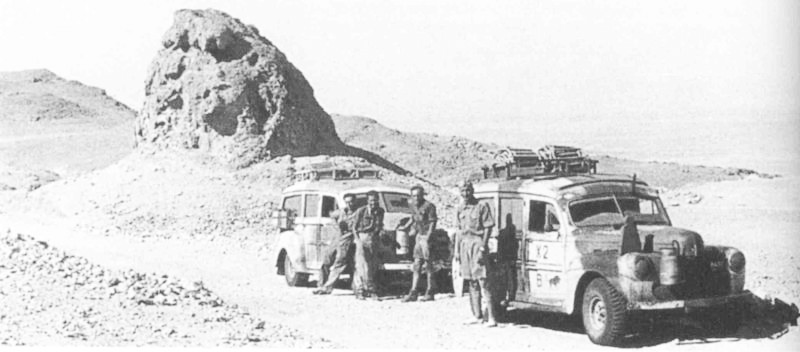
Heading to Cairo - May, 1942

Operation Salam was a 1942 World War II military operation organised by the Abwehr under the command of the Hungarian desert explorer László Almásy. The mission was conceived in order to assist Panzer Army Africa by delivering two German spies into British-held Egypt.

== Operation codename ==
While the name of the operation appears to derive from the Arabic "Salaam" (peace, also used as a common greeting), which is usually transcribed in most languages using the Latin alphabet with two "a"-s, the codename of the operation (used interchangeably in wireless transmissions both for the operation, and its leader, Almásy) was consistently "Salam", with one "a", in all related historical documents – or rather "SALAM", in keeping with the convention to render code names in all caps. It has been suggested (but never proved) that the origin of the code name could be a partial anagram of Almásy. Hence the operation should be correctly referred to as "(Operation) Salam" (or "SALAM"). Once the two spies were delivered by SALAM in Egypt, they were referred to as Operation CONDOR.

== Background ==
In 1942, after numerous advances back and forth in the North African desert, German and Italian forces had pushed Commonwealth forces into a retreat that ended at El Alamein. This position was an excellent site for defence of the Nile Delta, and preparations had been ordered by General Claude Auchinleck months previously. The area is bordered on the north by the Mediterranean and a huge salt pan, the impassable Qattara Depression, to the south. It is debatable whether Hitler had serious designs on the conquest of Egypt for he viewed the Mediterranean and Middle East Theatre as a sideshow and at the time of Operation SALAM he was very much concentrated on the recently launched Case Blue. The Afrika Korps which had been sent to support the Italians in North Africa, had demoralised the Allied forces with the fall of Tobruk and the Battle of Gazala. The United States was months away from participation in the Desert war and the Axis commander Erwin Rommel had plans for capturing Egypt which would have put the Allies in a very precarious situation with the Suez Canal under enemy control. Although the Germans had intelligence coups such as the Black code/Bonner Fellers intercepts, they had few agents in Egypt. Operation SALAM was intended to provide them eyes and ears in Cairo where the British authorities and community were in crisis over the Axis advance, with a citywide curfew in the months before June 1942 and many Europeans fleeing to Palestine. Two spies would be delivered via a route taken far south of the Qattara Depression where the enormous expanses of open desert would lessen the risks of being captured.

László Almásy was an experienced desert explorer, motorist and aviator. He had already explored the Libyan and Egyptian deserts in the 1920s and 30s with other Europeans such as Ralph Bagnold (founder of the Long Range Desert Group) and Patrick Clayton who were now working for the British Middle East Command. When Hungary had entered the war on the side of the Axis, Almásy was recruited by the Abwehr (German military intelligence), initially to aid in the preparation of maps and the description of desert terrain. Subsequently, he was assigned to an Abwehr commando operating in Libya under the command of Major Nikolaus Ritter. After Ritter was injured in the first airborne attempt to deliver two spies to Egypt (the first Operation Condor), Almásy assumed command of the unit. Planning for what eventually became Operation SALAM started in earnest in the fall of 1941.

== The route ==
The initial plan was to enter Egypt by crossing the desert south of Siwa Oasis, starting from the Italian held Jalo Oasis using captured British CMP Ford trucks and patrol cars, delivering the two agents, Johannes Eppler and Hans Gerd Sandstede. Planning and preparations took several months, and the start was delayed several times due to the changing situation on the front. Finally Operation SALAM was ready to start from Tripoli on 29 April 1942.

Reaching Jalo oasis in Libya they started out towards the east where Italian maps suggested a firm flat serir (a hard surfaced gravel desert) but they soon encountered an impassable range of low dunes unmarked on the map. After several members fell sick and one of the cars was abandoned in the dunes with a broken axle, the party returned to Jalo oasis to make an aerial reconnaissance of the route. Starting out a second time they encountered the same difficulties and Almásy devised a new plan: with fewer cars and members they would go south towards enemy occupied Kufra oasis and then across the Gilf Kebir along a route known to Almásy from his explorations there ten years earlier. From this point onwards the account of Operation SALAM is narrated by Almásy, in his diary of the operation.

After crossing the Gilf Kebir they bluffed their way through Kharga Oasis and then dropped Eppler and Sandstede off at the edge of the desert escarpment near Asyut. Operation SALAM now became Operation CONDOR with the two spies on their way to Cairo, while Almásy and his convoy of vehicles returned into Axis-held Libya. He was awarded the Iron Cross (first class) and promoted to the rank of major by the commander of the Afrika Korps, Erwin Rommel.

== Intercepted Wireless messages ==
By early 1941 British code-breakers at Bletchley Park had managed to decipher the Abwehr hand cypher used by field stations (including SALAM), and by early 1942 had also broken the Enigma machine code which was used for the most-secret communication between German commands. Code named ULTRA, this source of information was considered so vital to the war effort, that it was only de-classified in the early seventies. Almásy's presence in Libya was already known to British intelligence from captured messages by late 1941 but the nature of his activities was not. It was only when Operation SALAM was well underway that a young intelligence analyst, Jean Alington (later Jean Howard) realised that an enemy unit was moving in the Libyan Desert behind British lines. As Rommel's advance was imminent, messages from Panzerarmee Afrika had priority in deciphering and analysis, and there was several days delay in warning HQ Middle East in Cairo. By the time a search was organised, Almásy was safely back in Jalo.

== Operation CONDOR ==
In Egypt, Eppler went under the name of Hussein Gaffar. He had grown up in Alexandria and Cairo after his mother had remarried to a wealthy Egyptian and Eppler had thus acquired this name. Sandstede posed as an American 'Peter Monkaster', since he had worked in the U.S. petroleum industry before the war and could pass as a Scandinavian American. After a rail journey to Cairo, the two spies rented a houseboat on the river Nile. Sandstede had installed their radio set in a gramophone cabinet in the living room on the boat. This device of furniture was built by Sandstede himself as a masterpiece of carpenter craftsmanship; the radio unit and the gramophone unit (record player) could still be operated while the radio operator was seated inside the cabinet veiled behind a wooden panel unseen and undetectable from the outside and send Morse radio messages while the device played music.

Eppler in his book claims that they garnered information on British troop and vehicle movements with help from a nationalist-inclined belly dancer Hekmet Fahmy (Eppler's girlfriend), as well as other dancers and escorts in the bars and nightclubs of Cairo – a very lively city during the war and the destination of thousands of Allied service personnel on leave. Eppler claimed to have often posed as a lieutenant in the Rifle Brigade of the British Army and used forged British and Egyptian banknotes. Using an arranged system of codes based on Daphne du Maurier's book Rebecca (Gershom Gorenberg writes 'an interrogation report notes that the book the spies were supposed to use as a key for their cipher was called “The Unwarranted Death.” Unless this was the title of an obscure edition of “Rebecca” the use of that novel is a later embellishment that became a fixture in the spies’ legend' - however no book with the title given by Gorenberg is listed on the British Library catalogue) he claims to have managed to make temporary radio contact with a German forward radio interception post near Alamein (the nearest to Cairo Axis forces had reached before the Battle of El Alamein). Communication problems forced them to request assistance from the Cairo-based Free Officers Movement, who were nominally pro-Axis in the belief that they would 'liberate' Egypt from the British. A young Anwar El Sadat (who much later would become President of Egypt) was sent to help with Eppler and Sandstede's radio equipment.

The truth was quite different, as revealed by the interrogation protocols taken after their capture. Eppler and Stanstede never managed to collect any meaningful information, and they never made any contact with a German radio station after they parted with Almásy near Asyut. Unknown to them, communication was impossible as the designated SALAM wireless operators had been captured when Rommel's advance headquarters were overrun near Bir Hakeim on 29 May. Thus in part Rommel was responsible for the failure of CONDOR, as he personally ordered the SALAM operators to join his headquarters as there was a shortage of wireless operators during the battle. Fearful of reprisals in case of Rommel actually reaching Cairo, they started to create fake diaries detailing their supposed intelligence gathering and meeting of various sources.

Apparently, all Eppler and Sandstede ever did in Cairo was to spend the considerable sums they had at their disposal on women and a lavish lifestyle. Sadat was extremely critical of them in his book Revolt on the Nile. Sadat's view was that the two Germans deliberately sabotaged their own radio, since they wanted to enjoy themselves and live with two Jewish prostitutes. Reading the British interrogation reports, it is hard to argue with this view.

The spies' extravagant lifestyle (and the fact that unknown to them, most of the British pounds they had with them were forgeries), as well as the various other leads picked up by Allied intelligence, led to their hideout being discovered and the houseboat was boarded by British Field Security. Sandstede had started to flood the vessel but they were quickly taken into custody. Sanstede attempted suicide by slashing his wrists but eventually Eppler and Sandstede cooperated with their interrogators and were spared execution (the usual fate of spies out of uniform during World War II). Hekmet Fakhmy only received a suspended sentence but later claimed that she provided valuable intelligence to Eppler and that she was imprisoned for two years.

== The SALAM diary ==
The diary of Almásy describing the events from 15 to 29 May 1942 surfaced in Austria in 1949 or 1950, found by Lt. Col. Count Peter de Salis, who was at the time working for the Intelligence Organization, Allied Commission for Austria. Seeing the name of Bagnold mentioned several times in the document, de Salis forwarded the diary to Brigadier Ralph Alger Bagnold through intelligence channels. It is not known at what point was the original German text translated into English but two versions remain. One which was passed on by Bagnold to David Lloyd Owen and is kept in the Imperial War Museum. This copy was found by Michael Rolke when doing some unrelated research and formed the basis for the German re-translation that appeared in the re-publication of the German version of Almásy's "Unknown Sahara" in 1987 (Schwimmer in der Wüste, Haymon, Innsbruck). Another version was prepared by Jean Howard (née Alington), who received the English translation from Bagnold in 1978, together with the cover note of Count de Salis and other forwarders. She re-typed the documents, correcting a number of errors and mis-translations based on her superior knowledge of German and making some abbreviations to reduce the task of re-typing. This is also the source of the uncertainty regarding the finding date, as the note of de Salis (as copied by Jean Howard) dates 28 January 1950, while the later forwarding note dates 2 February 1949, obviously one having been copied in error. The original diary is probably still in the unreleased MI5 Personnel File of Almásy. There is no question as to the authenticity of the document, the contents of which are corroborated by many sources including intercepted wireless messages. As it surfaced during Almásy's life, it could have even been with his knowledge that it was passed to Count de Salis. The 2013 book on Operation SALAM contains a merged transcript of the IWM and the Howard copies.

== Other long-range operations in the region ==
Although Operation CONDOR ended in failure, Operation SALAM is notable as one of the few Axis operations that mirrored the important Long Range Desert Group activities in the Libyan Desert during the North African campaign. The Italian Auto-Saharan Companies (Compagnie Auto-Avio-Sahariane, a desert patrol group formed on three to five companies, with various vehicles customised for desert operations and integrated air support, and sometimes referred to as La Compagnia), was a long-lived unit that harassed SAS and LRDG operations up until Allied victory in Libya and Tunisia.

== In popular culture ==
- A fictional portrayal of László Almásy and Operation SALAM is present in the Michael Ondaatje novel "The English Patient" and the film based upon it.
- The novel The Key to Rebecca by Ken Follett (1980) is loosely based on Operation SALAM. A TV miniseries based on this book was produced in 1985.
- The German film Rommel ruft Kairo (Rommel Calls Cairo), directed by Wolfgang Schleif in 1959, is based on the book written by John Eppler, although it takes many liberties and does not pretend to be an exact account of the operation.
- The 1960 film Foxhole in Cairo stars Adrian Hoven as Eppler, Neil McCallum as his radio operator, and Peter van Eyck as Almasy, with Lee Montague and Michael Caine appearing as other German operatives taking part in the mission. The film is drawn from the 1958 book by Leonard Mosley, The Cat and the Mice.

== See also ==
- László Almásy
- Egypt in World War II
- Afrika Korps (Deutsches Afrikakorps)
- Abwehr (German intelligence organization)
- Sudan Defence Force
- Western Desert Campaign
- North African Campaign
- Desert warfare
