= Hekmet Fahmy =

Egyptian actress (born 1907)

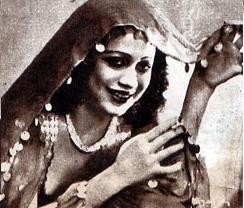
- Hekmet in a veil, 1942
- Born: November 24, 1907; Damietta, Ottoman Egypt
- Died: June 28, 1974
- Occupations: Actress and Dancer, Spy for Nazi Germany

Hekmet Fahmy (Arabic:حكمت فهمي), also spelled Hekmat Fahmi, was an Egyptian Arab Actress and Dancer. Known as the “Sultana of Love”, she starred in several films and was a prominent belly dancer in Egypt, she began visiting nightclubs in Germany to perform her dances before the outbreak of World War II. She became romantically involved with German agent Johannes Eppler in Vienna, who was infatuated with her beauty and her “lustrous head of black hair” and “tawny skin”, and was subsequently recruited by him into becoming an agent for the Abwehr, feeding intelligence from Cairo. Using romantic liaisons with British officers to acquire information, she assisted with Operation Salam in 1942.

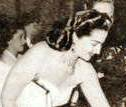
Hekmet Fahmy in a white dress

The story of Operations Salam and Condor and the spy ring surrounding it, including László Almásy in charge of the operation, has been the subject of multiple fictionalized popular narratives, such as the 1992 novel The English Patient (and its 1996 movie adaptation). Hekmet's relationship with Eppler and intelligence gathering for Germany has been the source of inspiration for multiple movies and books, including Rommel Calls Cairo, The Key to Rebecca, Foxhole in Cairo, and the 1994 Egyptian film The Spy Hekmet Fahmyالجاسوسه حكمت فهمى (فيلم).

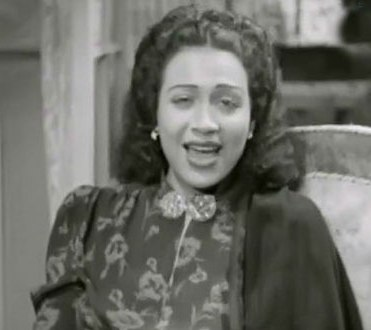
Hekmet in 1939

She appeared in several films from 1933 until 1947 when she retired. She married Egyptian director Mohamed Abdel Gawwad with whom she had two children. She died in 1974.
