= Colin Leo Bliss =

English parachutist

- Born: 27 April 1907; Sandy, Bedfordshire, England
- Died: 10 July 1944 (aged 37); Le Mesnil, France
- Burial place: Ranville, France
- Military career
- Allegiance: United Kingdom
- Branch: British Army
- Rank: Major
- Nickname: "Charles"
- Service number: 253486
- Commands: A Company, 12th Parachute Battalion
- Conflicts: Airborne D-Day Landings, World War II

Major Colin Leo Bliss (27 April 1907 – 10 July 1944) was a pioneer of operational parachuting. Known in the forces as Charles Bliss, his early dangerous work parachuting from low flying planes with heavy equipment strapped to his back helped design the parachutes that were later used as part of the airborne D-Day Landings. On a visit to the 6th Airborne Division prior to the D-Day Landings, King George VI asked who was responsible for the ingenuity behind the parachute training and the General explained it was Bliss. Bliss was subsequently introduced to the King by whom he was congratulated.

Bliss's obituary by the writer and journalist Leonard Mosley in The Daily Sketch described Bliss as ‘one of the bravest, and most reckless of all the men who landed in France on D-Day. He was the greatest paratrooper of them all. Ask any of the men who went in with the Paratroop Corps, British, Canadian or American, and they will confirm that’. As a Correspondent with the Allied Forces, Mosley had accompanied Bliss and the Battalion during the D-Day Landings, parachuting into France with a typewriter strapped to his back.

== Life ==
Colin Leo Bliss was born in Sandy, Bedfordshire, England, on 27 April 1907, the fifth son of Inspector John Wilfred Bliss and Dora Amy Louise (née Andrews). He was educated at Bedford Modern School between 1919 and 1922 where he enjoyed rugby.

After school, Bliss joined the Merchant Service and travelled extensively. He later enlisted with the Bedfordshire and Hertfordshire Regiment and decided to volunteer for airborne service in the early stages of World War II, reportedly the second person to volunteer. He served in the 1st Parachute Battalion and was appointed Seargent Major of ‘S Company’. He took the 1st Advanced Parachute Training Course at RAF Ringway in January 1942.

Bliss was commissioned on the 5 December 1942 and joined the 12th Parachute Battalion. Bliss's early dangerous work parachuting from low flying planes with heavy equipment helped design the parachutes that were later used as part of the Airborne D-Day Landings. On a visit to the 6th Airborne Division, shortly before the D-Day Landings, King George VI asked who was responsible for the ingenuity behind the parachute training and the General explained it was Bliss who was subsequently introduced to the King by whom he was congratulated.

Bliss was made Captain ahead of the Normandy Landings in June 1944. Bliss was tasked with carrying Leonard Mosley’s typewriter ribbon to France with paper and a camera (along with equipment critical to the mission), Mosley also being parachuted into France with the Battalion carrying his typewriter. After the landing in France on the morning of 6 June 1944, Bliss was missing (assumed dead) for two days but had reached Caen to begin his work. According to Mosley, Bliss:

‘moved around the outskirts of the town, sniping sentries and dynamiting unattended lorries. When things got too hot for him, he stole a Nazi regimental commander’s car and sped north. When machine gun bullets put his car in a ditch, he scrambled out, did a quick run round the back of the Nazi post which had stopped him and gave it three hand grenades through the slits.’

Bliss’s battalion captured Ranville and later acted in support of the attack on the Germans at St Honorine. Bliss was put in Command of a Composite Company of the battalion on 18 June 1944. On 3 July 1944, Bliss gained command of A Company of the battalion. On 7 July 1944, A Company was subject to heavy fire whereupon Bliss fired a Bren gun from the hip as he advanced towards the enemy but was wounded. He died from his wounds on 10 July 1944, and was buried at Ranville War Cemetery in Normandy, France.

Bliss married Anne May Moore at St Lawrence Church, Bedfordshire, on 28 March 1932. He was survived by his wife and two sons. The Daily Sketch obituary, written by Leonard Mosley, praised Bliss as ‘the greatest paratrooper of them all' and one of the 'bravest, and most reckless of the D Day landings. He was the greatest paratrooper of them all. Ask any of the men who went in with the Paratroop Corps, British, Canadian or American, and they will confirm that’. Bliss described his life as a Paratroop leader as ‘another glorious adventure’ and his last letters home described his part in the Normandy campaign as ‘great fun’.
