= Atlantic Wall (film) =

1970 film

- Directed by: Marcel Camus
- Written by: Marcel Jullian; Marcel Camus
- Story by: Colonel Rémy
- Produced by: Georges de Beauregard
- Starring: Bourvil; Peter McEnery
- Cinematography: Alain Levent
- Music by: Claude Bolling
- Release date: 1970
- Language: French
- Box office: 4,770,962 admissions (France)

Atlantic Wall (French: Le Mur de l'Atlantique, Italian: Un elmetto pieno di... fifa) is a 1970 French-Italian war-comedy film written and directed by Marcel Camus and starring Bourvil and Peter McEnery. It was Bourvil's last film.

== Plot ==
The story is set during the Second World War, under the occupation of France, and shortly before the Battle of Normandy. Léon Duchemin is a peaceful restaurateur whose wife left him twenty years earlier. He lived in the company of his eccentric sister Maria, and his young adult daughter Juliette. His clients represent the whole of society in the village, ranging from Rommel's driver, to resistance fighters and black market traffickers.

One evening, during an air raid, Jeff, a British aviator whose plane was shot down, almost falls into Juliette's room. The next day, Leon hangs out with Charlus, the craftsman responsible for repainting his storefront. Leon is misidentified as the painter in question and is taken to the Kommandantur, where they have a similar job to offer him. Leon inadvertently carries a secret plan concerning the fortifications of the Atlantic Wall. Having made the acquaintance of Jeff who understands the interest of the discovery made by Leon, the latter is therefore obliged to join the French Resistance. The resistance takes the two men to England. Leon then finds himself in a British army training camp, under the orders of Jeff himself. He does not yet know that his daughter Juliette is pregnant and that the aviator will become his son-in-law.

== Cast ==
- Bourvil as Léon Duchemin
- Peter McEnery as Jeff
- Sophie Desmarets as Maria Duchemin
- Jean Poiret as Armand
- Reinhardt Kolldehoff as Lt. Heinrich Jakobus Steinbichler aka Totor
- Sara Franchetti as Juliette Duchemin
- Pino Caruso as Lt. Friedrich
- Terry-Thomas as Comm. Perry
- Jean-Pierre Zola as Colonel Muller
- Georges Staquet as Hippolyte
- Jacques Préboist as Ernest
- Johannes Eppler as Erwin Rommel
- Annabel Leventon as Sybil
- Jackie Sardou as Angèle Charlus
- William Mervyn as Jeff's Father
- Jess Hahn as British Colonel
- Patrick Préjean as British Officer
- Michel Robin as The Shoemaker
- Jacques Balutin as Gendarme
- Norman Mitchell as First Cop
- Stephen Yardley as Second Cop

== Reception ==
The film was the second most popular film in France in 1970, after Le Gendarme en balade.
