= Foxhole in Cairo =

1960 British film by John Llewellyn Moxey

- Original British quad poster
- Directed by: John Llewellyn Moxey
- Screenplay by: Leonard Mosley; Donald Taylor
- Based on: novel The Cat and the Mice by Leonard Mosley
- Produced by: Steven Pallos; Donald Taylor
- Starring: James Robertson Justice; Adrian Hoven; Fenella Fielding
- Cinematography: Desmond Dickinson
- Music by: Douglas Gamley; Ken Jones
- Production company: Omnia Films
- Distributed by: British Lion Film Corporation
- Release date: 1960
- Running time: 80 minutes
- Country: United Kingdom
- Language: English

Foxhole in Cairo is a 1960 British war film directed by John Llewellyn Moxey and starring James Robertson Justice, Adrian Hoven, Fenella Fielding and Henry Oscar. It was written by Leonard Mosley and Donald Taylor based on Mosley's 1958 novel The Cat and the Mice, based upon the real-life Operation Salaam and the activity of Abwehr agents Johannes Eppler and Hekmet Fahmy. Future star Michael Caine makes a brief appearance as a German soldier, in one of his earlier screen roles.

== Synopsis ==
During the Second World War Field Marshal Erwin Rommel has placed two spies in Cairo, at the headquarters of the British Eighth Army. They are able to monitor every move of the British. It falls to British intelligence to hunt down the spies before they do too much damage to the war effort.

== Cast ==
- James Robertson Justice as Captain Robertson
- Adrian Hoven as John Eppler
- Niall MacGinnis as Radek
- Peter van Eyck as Count Almassy
- Robert Urquhart as Major Wilson
- Neil McCallum as Sandy
- Fenella Fielding as Yvette
- Gloria Mestre as Amina
- Albert Lieven as Erwin Rommel
- John Westbrook as Roger
- Lee Montague as Aberle
- Michael Caine as Weber
- Henry Oscar as Col. Zeltinger
- Howard Marion-Crawford as British Major
- Anthony Newlands as S.S. Colonel
- Richard Vernon as British General
- Nancy Nevinson as Signorina Signorelli
- Jerome Willis as 1st British Signals Sergeant
- Philip Bond as German Signals Sergeant
- Walter Randall as 2nd barman

== Reception ==
=== Box office ===
Kine Weekly called it a "money maker" at the British box office in 1960.

=== Critical ===
The Monthly Film Bulletin wrote: "Allegedly based on fact, few of the incidents in this stale, melodramatic espionage hotch-potch tie up convincingly; the climax seems particularly unbelievable. However, even if the facts were vouchsafed as entirely authentic, the film would still be tepid entertainment. A variable team is headed by James Robertson Justice, who is not happily cast as the Cairo British Intelligence man; Albert Lieven's Rommel is interesting enough but the role is small."

Kine Weekly wrote: "The tale is based on fact, but pedestrian direction, tired scripting and uneven acting reduce its main action to pulp fiction level. Its hokum, presented against colourful, if not entirely convincing, backgrounds and seasoned with sex, should, nevertheless, intrigue and thrill the 'ninepennies.' ... The picture is true in outline but tarting up lessens rather than heightens realism and dramatic impact. James Robertson Justice impresses as the blustering and wily Robertson; Adrian Hoven definitely has his moments as Eppler; and Niall MacGinnis registers as Radek; but Robert Urquhart overdoes it as the weak Wilson; and both Fenella Fielding and Gloria Mestre lack subtlety as Yvette and Amina, There is penultimate suspense and some flaws in the script are papered over with official war 'shots,' but even so the film seldom escapes from an atmosphere of theatrical artificiality."

A 1961 New York Times review described the film as "a routine British-made espionage yarn" calling the plot "slack and predictable", while praising the professional performance of James Robertson Justice.

== See also ==
- Rommel Calls Cairo (1959)
