= Rommel Calls Cairo =

1959 film

- Directed by: Wolfgang Schleif
- Written by: John Eppler (novel); K.H. Turner; Heinz Oskar Wuttig
- Starring: Adrian Hoven; Elisabeth Müller; Peter van Eyck
- Cinematography: Kurt Grigoleit
- Edited by: Hermann Ludwig
- Music by: Wolfram Röhrig
- Production company: Omega Film
- Distributed by: Neue Filmverleih
- Release date: 19 February 1959
- Running time: 105 minutes
- Country: West Germany
- Language: German

Rommel Calls Cairo (German: Rommel ruft Kairo) is a 1959 West German war thriller film directed by Wolfgang Schleif and starring Adrian Hoven, Elisabeth Müller and Peter van Eyck. It is based on a real incident from the North African Campaign during the Second World War.

The film's sets were designed by the art directors Ludwig Reiber and Hans Strobel. It was shot on location in Egypt.

Van Eyck reprised his role as László Almásy in the British film Foxhole in Cairo, which was released the following year.

== Cast ==
- Adrian Hoven as Capt. Johannes Eppler, alias Hussein Gafaar
- Elisabeth Müller as Lt. Kay Morrison
- Peter van Eyck as Capt. Graf von Almassy
- Paul Klinger as Field Marshal Erwin Rommel
- Leila Iman as Amina (based on Hekmet Fahmy)
- Herbert Tiede as Col. Robertson
- Ernst Reinhold as Sandy
- Wolf Ackva as Maj. Smith
- Til Kiwe as Amis
- Saliman as Achmed
- Albert Hehn as Lüdinghausen
- Horst Uhse as Schmitz
- Siegfried Dornbusch as Schulze
- Gustl Weishappel as Gruber
- Manfred Andrae as Oberfeldwebel
- Werner Stock as Abele
- Heinz Lausch
- Lili Schoenborn-Anspach
- Panos Papadopulos as Sharani
- Karin Hauck as Leila
- Heinz Simon as Bachmann

== Bibliography ==
- Davidson, John & Hake, Sabine. Framing the Fifties: Cinema in a Divided Germany. Berghahn Books, 2007.
