= Peter van Eyck =

German-American actor (1911–1969)

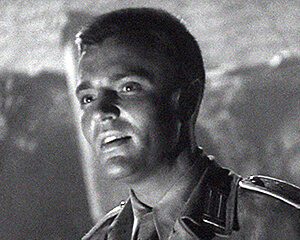
- Van Eyck in Five Graves to Cairo (1943)
- Born: Götz Walter Wolfgang von Eick; 16 July 1911; Steinwehr, Pomerania, German Empire (present-day Kamienny Jaz, West Pomeranian Voivodeship, Poland)
- Died: 15 July 1969 (aged 57); Männedorf, Canton of Zürich, Switzerland
- Citizenship: West Germany; United States (after 1943)
- Occupation: Actor
- Years active: 1943–1969
- Spouse(s): Ruth Ford (m. 1940; div. 194?); Inge von Voris (m. 19??)
- Children: 3

Peter van Eyck (born Götz Walter Wolfgang von Eick; 16 July 1911 – 15 July 1969) was a German and American actor. Born in Prussian Pomerania, he moved to the United States in the 1930s and established a career as a character actor. After World War II, he returned to his native country and became a leading man in West German cinema.

Internationally, his best known roles included The Wages of Fear (1953), Mr. Arkadin (1955), The Longest Day (1962), The Spy Who Came In from the Cold (1965), and the 1960s Dr. Mabuse films. He was twice nominated for the German Film Award for Best Actor, for Blind Justice (1961) and for The River Line (1964).

== Early life ==
Van Eyck was born Götz von Eick into an aristocratic German family from Pomerania (since 1945 part of Poland). After graduating from high school he studied music in Berlin.

While studying music in Berlin, Van Eyck purportedly had a brief liaison with Jean Ross, a cabaret singer who inspired the fictional character of Sally Bowles. Ross became pregnant with Eyck's child and, when Eyck departed Weimar-era Berlin, Ross had an abortion authorized by gay author Christopher Isherwood who falsely claimed to be her impregnator. These factual events served as the genesis for a short story by Isherwood which later became the 1937 novella Sally Bowles and was later adapted into the 1966 Cabaret musical and the 1972 film of the same name.

In 1931, after leaving Berlin, Van Eyck lived in Paris, London, Tunis, Algiers and Cuba, before settling in New York. He earned a living playing the piano in a bar, and wrote and composed for revues and cabarets, including several songs for Madame Spivy with lyricist John LaTouche. He worked for Irving Berlin as a stage manager and production assistant, and for Orson Welles Mercury Theatre company as an assistant director.

== Acting career ==
Van Eyck went to Hollywood where he worked as a truck driver. He initially found radio work with the help of Billy Wilder, who later gave him small film roles. In 1943, he took US citizenship and was drafted into the U.S. Army as a commissioned officer. At the end of World War II, he returned to Germany as a control officer for film and remained there until 1948 as director of the film section. He completed training at Camp Ritchie and is considered to be one of the Ritchie Boys. In 1949, he appeared in his first German film Hallo, Fräulein!

He gained international recognition with a leading role in the 1953 film Le Salaire de la peur (The Wages of Fear) directed by Henri-Georges Clouzot. He went on to appear in episodes of several US TV series including The Adventures of Ellery Queen and Alfred Hitchcock Presents. In English-language films he was most often typecast as a Nazi or other unsympathetic type, while in Germany he was a popular leading man in a wider range of films, including several appearances in the Dr. Mabuse thriller series of the 1960s.

== Personal life ==
Van Eyck was married to the American actress Ruth Ford for a short time in the 1940s. With his second wife, Inge von Voris, he had two daughters, Kristina, also an actress, and Claudia.

=== Death ===
He died in 1969 in Männedorf, Switzerland, of septicaemia, caused by an untreated (relatively) minor injury, a day before his 58th birthday.

== Selected filmography ==
- Hitler's Children (1943) — Arresting Sergeant (uncredited)
- The Moon Is Down (1943) — Lieutenant Tonder
- Edge of Darkness (1943) — German Soldier (uncredited)
- Five Graves to Cairo (1943) — Lieutenant Schwegler
- Action in the North Atlantic (1943) — German Ensign (uncredited)
- Hitler's Madman (1943) — Gestapo (uncredited)
- The Impostor (1944) — Hafner
- Address Unknown (1944) — Heinrich Schulz
- Resisting Enemy Interrogation (1944) — Captain Granach - Young Nazi Officer (uncredited)
- Hello, Fraulein! (1949) — Tom Keller
- Royal Children (1950) — Paul König
- Blondes for Export (1950) — Rolf Carste
- The Orplid Mystery (1950) — Steward Stefan Lund
- Furioso (1950) — Peter von Rhoden
- Third from the Right (1950) — Renato
- The Desert Fox: The Story of Rommel (1951) — German Officer (uncredited)
- Heart of the Casbah (1952) — Jo
- The Wages of Fear (1953) — Bimba
- Sailor of the King, also known as Single-Handed (1953) — Kapitän Ludvik von Falk
- Alarm in Morocco (1953) — Howard
- La chair et le diable (1953) — Mathias Valdès
- Night People (1954) — Captain Sergei "Petey" Petrochine
- Flesh and the Woman (1954) — Fred
- Tarzan's Hidden Jungle (1955) — Dr. Celliers
- A Bullet for Joey (1955) — Eric Hartman
- Sophie and the Crime (1955) — Franck Richter
- Mr. Arkadin (1955) — Thaddeus
- Jump into Hell (1955) — Lieutenant Heinrich Heldman
- The Cornet (1955) — Mönchschreiber
- Alfred Hitchcock Presents (1956) (Season 1 Episode 21: Safe Conduct") as Officer
- The Rawhide Years (1956) — Andre Boucher
- Run for the Sun (1956) — Dr. Van Anders / Colonel Von Andre
- Attack! (1956) — SS Captain
- Burning Fuse (1957) — Pedro Wassewich
- Fric-frac en dentelles (1957) — Peter Simon
- Retour de manivelle (1957) — Eric Fréminger
- The Glass Tower (1957) — John Lawrence
- Anyone Can Kill Me (1957) — Cyril Glad
- Doctor Crippen Lives (1958) — Kriminalkommissar Léon Ferrier
- Rosemary (1958) — Alfons Fribert
- Schmutziger Engel (1958) — Studienrat Dr. Torsten Agast
- The Snorkel (1958) — Paul Decker
- Schwarze Nylons - Heiße Nächte (1958) — Alexandre
- Your Body Belongs to Me (1959) — Alexander
- Rommel Calls Cairo (1959) — Capt. Graf von Almassy
- Lockvogel der Nacht (1959) — Karl Amsel
- The Rest Is Silence (1959) — Generaldirektor Paul Claudius
- Crime After School (1959) — Dr. Knittel
- Labyrinth (1959) — Ron Stevens
- The Black Chapel (1959) — Robert Golder
- Rebel Flight to Cuba (1959) — Captain Pink Roberti
- Sweetheart of the Gods (1960) — Dr. Hans Simon
- The Thousand Eyes of Dr. Mabuse (1960) — Henry B. Travers
- Foxhole in Cairo (1960) — Cont Almasky
- World in My Pocket (1961) — Bleck
- Legge di guerra (1961) — Hauptmann Langenau
- La Fête espagnole (1961) — Michel Georgenko
- Die Stunde, die du glücklich bist (1961) — Bönisch
- Blind Justice (1961) — Prosecutor Dr. Robert Kessler
- The Constant Wife (1962) — Dr. Fred Calonder
- The Devil's Agent (1962) — Georg Droste
- The Longest Day (1962) — Lieutenant Colonel Ocker
- The Brain (1962) — Dr. Peter Corrie
- Station Six-Sahara (1962) — Kramer
- Ostrva (1963) — Peter
- Scotland Yard Hunts Dr. Mabuse (1963) — Major Bill Tern
- And So to Bed (1963) — Chef
- An Alibi for Death (1963) — Günther Rohn
- The Secret of Dr. Mabuse (1964) — Major Bob Anders
- The River Line (1964) — Major Barton
- Kidnapped to Mystery Island (1964) — Captain McPherson
- The Spy Who Came In from the Cold (1965) — Hans-Dieter Mundt
- The Dirty Game (1965) — Petchatkin
- Die Herren (1965) — Colonel - episode 'Die Soldaten'
- Duel at Sundown (1965) — Don McGow
- Living It Up (1966) — Peter von Kessner
- Requiem for a Secret Agent (1966) — Oscar Rubeck
- High Season for Spies (1966) — Kramer / Jack Haskins
- Der Zündholzkönig – Der Fall Ivar Kreuger (1967, TV film) — Ivar Kreuger
- L'Homme qui valait des milliards (1967) — Muller
- Code Name: Red Roses (1968) — Oberst Kerr
- Tevye and His Seven Daughters (1968) — Priest
- Assignment to Kill (1968) — Walter Green
- Shalako (1968) — Baron Frederick Von Hallstatt
- The Bridge at Remagen (1969) — Generaloberst von Brock (final film role)
