= Kamienny Jaz =

- Village
- Location within Poland
- Coordinates: 52°58′59″N 14°32′38″E
- Country: Poland
- Voivodeship: West Pomeranian
- County: Gryfino
- Gmina: Chojna

Kamienny Jaz [kaˈmjɛnnɨ ˈjas] (German: Steinwehr) is a village in the administrative district of Gmina Chojna, within Gryfino County, West Pomeranian Voivodeship, in north-western Poland, close to the German border. It lies approximately 9 km (6 mi) east of Chojna, 30 km (19 mi) south of Gryfino, and 49 km (30 mi) south of the regional capital Szczecin.

For the history of the region, see History of Pomerania.

== Notable residents ==
- Peter van Eyck (1911–1969), actor
