= Johannes Eppler =

World War II Abwehr spy

Johannes Eppler (1914–1999), also known as Hans Eppler, John Eppler, and Hussein Gaafer, was a World War II Abwehr spy, a German who had been raised in Egypt by his Egyptian stepfather. One of Rommel's spies during the North African campaign in World War II, Operation Salaam led by László Almásy spirited Eppler and Hans-Gerd Sandstede into Cairo although they were both arrested soon after arrival in July 1942. Eppler is the subject of MI5 file KV 2/1467. His girlfriend, belly-dancer and actress Hekmet Fahmy spied on British officers in Cairo.

== Life ==
=== Second World War ===
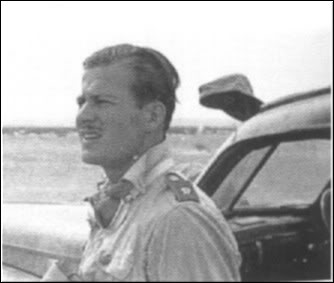
Eppler in 1942

Eppler and a colleague, both described as having “light hair and pale eyes”, disguised as British officers, infiltrated Cairo and made contact with the Free Officers movement, who were attempting to defect to the Axis. Their plans ultimately fell through and Eppler and future Egyptian president Anwar Sadat were imprisoned together. According to Sadat, Eppler was visited in his cell by Winston Churchill in 1942 and offered leniency in exchange for a full confession.

=== Life after the war ===
In 1946, Eppler was released from British captivity. He wrote two books about his life as an intelligence officer, but historians have shown that his actual work was ineffective and amateurish. In the late 1950s, he initially lived as a bookseller in Saarland state, West Germany, and from 1957 onward, he worked as an entrepreneur in France.

== Fictional portrayals ==
Eppler is the subject of a book by Leonard Mosley, The Cat and the Mice, and is again referenced in Mosley's The Druid. Eppler and his radio operator Sandstede are played by Adrian Hoven and Neil McCallum in the British film of The Cat and the Mice, retitled Foxhole in Cairo (1960) (although Sandstede is renamed Sandy).

Another depiction of Eppler's exploits is in the German film Rommel Calls Cairo (1959) based upon Eppler's book of the same name. In this film, Eppler is again portrayed by Adrian Hoven.

Eppler portrayed Rommel in the French film Le Mur de l'Atlantique (1970), France's second most popular film in 1970, after Le Gendarme en balade.

The film and novel The English Patient also reference Operation Salaam and Eppler's activities.

Eppler's history is the same as that of the character Alexander (Achmed) Wolff, the Cairo spy in Ken Follett's "The Key to Rebecca" (1980).

== See also ==
- The Key to Rebecca – Ken Follett's novel, partly based on Eppler's activities.
