= The Golden Man Booker =

The Golden Man Booker was a special one-off prize awarded in commemoration of the 50th anniversary of the Booker Prize. All of the previous 51 winning titles since the Booker's inception in 1969 were eligible.

Five judges read the books from each relevant decade and chose a title which to be pitted against the judges' other choices. The judges' shortlist of five titles was announced on 26 May 2018, with voting also commencing that day. The winner was announced at a ceremony on 8 July 2018, at London's Southbank Centre, with the award going to Michael Ondaatje for his 1992 novel The English Patient.

The judges were (chosen decade in parentheses):

- Robert McCrum (1970s)
- Lemn Sissay (1980s)
- Kamila Shamsie (1990s)
- Simon Mayo (2000s)
- Hollie McNish (2010s)

The shortlisted works were:

- In a Free State (1971) — V.S. Naipaul
- Moon Tiger (1987) — Penelope Lively
- The English Patient (1992) — Michael Ondaatje
- Wolf Hall (2009) — Hilary Mantel
- Lincoln in the Bardo (2017) — George Saunders
