= Magyarab people =

Hungarian subgroup in Egypt and Sudan

Magyarabs
Regions with significant populations
- Egypt and Sudan: 7,000

Languages
- Arabic (Egyptian Arabic and Sudanese Arabic), English formerly Hungarian

Religion
- Sunni Islam

Related ethnic groups
- Other Hungarians

The Magyarabs are a small Hungarian subgroup living within Nubia, along the Nile in Egypt and Sudan. They descend from Hungarians (Magyars) who intermarried with locals, and are believed to date back to the late 16th century, when Hungary and Egypt were part of the Ottoman Empire.

== Name ==
The name "Magyarab" is not a portmanteau of the words "Magyar" and "Arab", as is commonly assumed. Rather, it is a concatenation of "Magyar" (Hungarian) and "Ab", which in Nubian means simply "tribe". Magyarab combined thus translates to "Tribe of the Magyars".

== History ==
According to legend, Hungarians who had only recently been brought under the control of the Ottoman Empire formed a part of the Ottoman army that was fighting in southern Egypt. Supposedly, a portion or the entirety of the fighting unit remained there and intermarried with the local Nubian women.

According to local Magyarabs, their ancestor was Ibrahim el-Magyar, a general who came from Buda (present-day Budapest) in 1517. He married a local Nubian woman; together, they had a son called Ali. Ali had five sons (Selami, Mustafa, Djelal Eddin, Musa and Iksa), and Ali's five sons were the ancestor of all Magyarabs. Magyarabs have been members of the World Federation of Hungarians (Magyarok Világszövetsége) since 1992 and still consider themselves as Hungarians.

They were not discovered by Europeans until 1935, when László Almásy, who was himself Hungarian, and his co-worker, the German engineer and explorer Hansjoachim von der Esch, happened upon the tribe in the region of Nubia. Representatives of the tribes later attempted to make contact with Hungarian officials but failed to do so because of the outbreak of World War II.

These people now have a mixed-race appearance because the intermarriage with the local Nubian population, and they do not speak Hungarian. Around 1934, however, Esch, who spent several weeks with the population of the Magyarab island at Wadi Halfa, put together a list of non-Arabic words that were used only on that island and, according to him, were recognized by Almásy as similar to Hungarian words. His notes showed that all Magyarab in Wadi Halfa were convinced that their ancestors came from "Nemsa" (the Arabic word for Austria), which might refer to any region of Austria-Hungary. He was told by the leader of the Magyarab island village that their ancestors had arrived in Egypt/Sudan as a group of "Austrian" soldiers, led by a man called Shenghal Sendjer, which Esch assumed to have been originally General Sendjer or Senger.

== Magyarab communities ==
Magyarabs live along the Nile, in Sudan around Wadi Halfa, in Egypt around Aswan in the villages of Magyarab-irki, Magyararti, Magyariyya, Magyar-nirki, Hillit el-Magyarab and about 400 Magyarabs live in Cairo.

== Sources ==
Detailed report about a Hungarian expedition:

- (in Hungarian) Islands on the Nile - The Csángós of Africa, the Magyarabs (1), Magyar Nemzet, Budapest, 10 03 2007 Archived 2008-06-05 at the Wayback Machine
- (in Hungarian) Islands on the Nile - The Csángós of Africa, the Magyarabs (2), Magyar Nemzet, Budapest, 17 03 2007 Deprecated link archived 2015-01-26 at archive.today
- (in Hungarian) Islands on the Nile - The Csángós of Africa, the Magyarabs (3), Magyar Nemzet, Budapest, 24 03 2007 Deprecated link archived 2015-01-26 at archive.today

Other references:

- Gergely, Lantai-Csont (11 March 2014). "Itt futhat magyarabokba Afrikában". Index.hu (in Hungarian). Archived from the original on 27 June 2024. Google translation: Archived 2023-11-08 at the Wayback Machine

- Pracucci, Giulia (1 December 2015). "UNGHERIA: Magyarab, una tribù africana con antenati ungheresi". East Journal (in Italian). Google translation: Archived 2023-11-08 at the Wayback Machine

- "Tudtad, hogy több ezer magyar él Egyiptom határán? Ők a magyarabok | nlc" (in Hungarian). NLC.hu. 22 September 2023. Archived from the original on 8 November 2023. Google translation: Archived 2023-11-08 at the Wayback Machine

- Idris, Abeer Babiker; Hassan, Hadeel Gassim; Ali, Maryam Atif Salaheldin; Eltaher, Sulafa Mohamed; Idris, Leena Babiker; Altayb, Hisham N.; Abass, Amin Mohamed; Ibrahim, Mustafa Mohammed Ahmed; Ibrahim, El-Amin Mohamed; Hassan, Mohamed A. (27 October 2020). "Molecular Phylogenetic Analysis of 16S rRNA Sequences Identified Two Lineages of Helicobacter pylori Strains Detected from Different Regions in Sudan Suggestive of Differential Evolution". International Journal of Microbiology. 2020: 1–12. doi:10.1155/2020/8825718. PMC 7609147. Archived from the original on 9 November 2023.

- Gábor, Margittai (26 August 2020). "Magyarabok szigete". Magyar Nemzet (in Hungarian). Archived from the original on 9 November 2023. An excerpt from László Almásy's 1935 description of his visit to the Magyarabs Google translation: Archived 2023-11-09 at the Wayback Machine

- Gábor, Margittai (10 March 2007). "Fekete sereg". Magyar Nemzet. Archived from the original on 5 June 2008.

- Hering, József (17 July 1997). "Magyarok a Nílus mentén" (in Hungarian). Demokrata. Archived from the original on 13 February 2005.
