= Hansjoachim von der Esch =

German explorer and diplomat (1899–1976)

Hansjoachim von der Esch (6 October 1899 in Mülheim, Germany – 10 May 1976 in La Tour-de-Peilz, Switzerland) was a German explorer in Egypt and Sudan, as well as German ambassador to Syria and Morocco.

== Career as explorer ==
After having served as officer during the First World War, Esch studied mechanical engineering and Arabic. From 1929 to 1939 he represented a German company in Egypt. During this time he made several expeditions into the Libyan Desert, and from 1934 to 1935, he accompanied the Hungarian explorer Laszlo Almasy on his motorized expeditions, who called him his "navigator". In 1934, Esch led a section of Almásy's expedition in the Gilf Kebir to the Uweinat mountain. Somewhat before, he came into contact with the Magyarab tribe, that claim to be of Hungarian origin, in Wadi Halfa, Sudan.

Esch also undertook several expeditions on his own, both by car and by camel train. His interest focussed not only on geographical measurements and cartography, but also on archaeology. At Wadi el-Hudi he claimed to have discovered ancient amethyst mines and interpreted nearby rock carvings and a series of ancient stone heaps as traces of the use of a dioptra for geodetics. Howard Carter acknowledged these discoveries, but disagreed with Esch's interpretation of early geodetics.

=== Later expeditions ===
Later on, Esch tried to trace the route taken by the Persian king Cambyses II during his attempt to conquer the oasis of Siwa. He discovered a series of big stone heaps which he attributed to the Persian army and interpreted the remains of thousands of jars at the "pottery hill" of Abu Ballas, discovered in 1917, as a water depot for the army. Somewhat later, he tried to explore the zone with a camel train. After a successful test expedition with Senussi nomads, accompanied by the English explorer E. E. Evans-Pritchard, he learned that the British authorities of Egypt, in the wake of growing tensions between the UK and Germany, had issued orders to the Senussi not to put camels at the disposal of foreigners. That put an end to his expeditions in Egypt.

In 1941 he published his experiences as an explorer and his archaeological findings and theories in the book Weenak – die Karawane ruft (Leipzig, 1941). The title, a combination of Arabic and German, means, "Wherever you are, the caravan calls." He also edited Almásy's books for publication in Germany.

== Career as ambassador and later life ==
From 1952 to 1957, Esch served as ambassador of the Federal Republic of Germany to Syria, and from 1957 to 1960, he was ambassador to Morocco. He died in 1976.
