= Pavlínov =

- Municipality
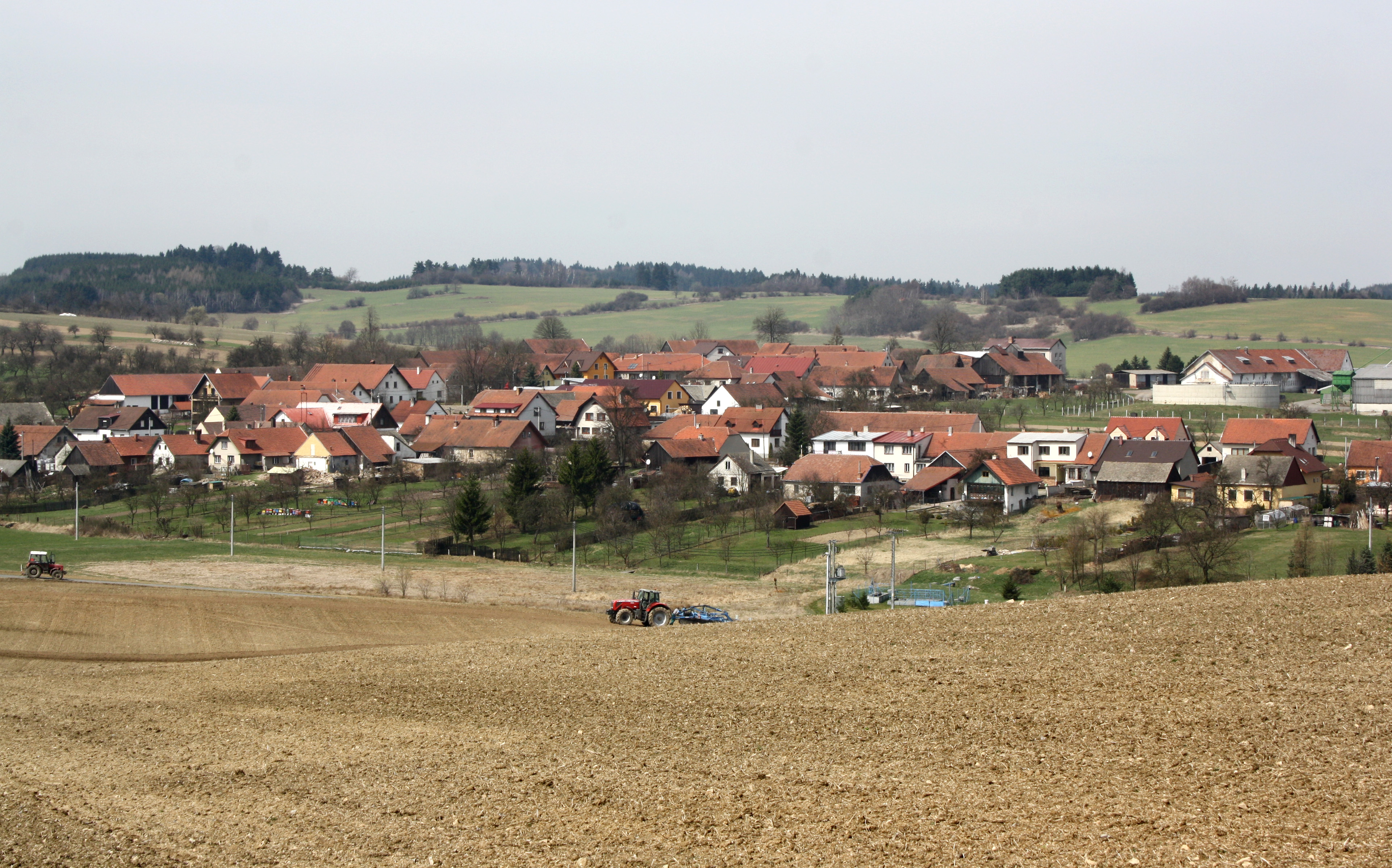
- Northern part of Pavlínov

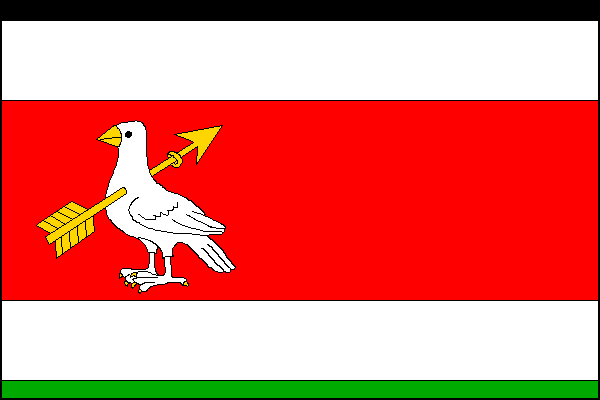
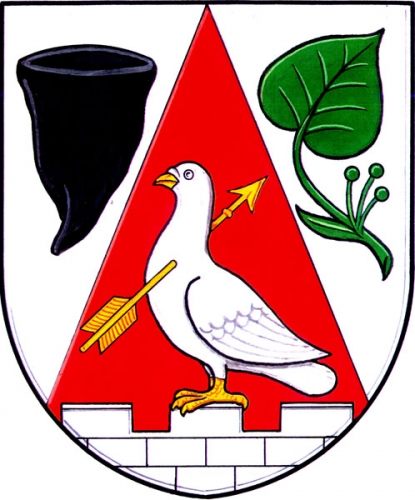
- Flag Coat of arms

- Location in the Czech Republic
- Coordinates: 49°20′53″N 15°52′43″E
- Country: Czech Republic
- Region: Vysočina
- District: Žďár nad Sázavou
- First mentioned: 1479

Area
  - Total: 7.54 km^{2} (2.91 sq mi)
- Elevation: 548 m (1,798 ft)

Population (2026-01-01)
  - Total: 274
  - Density: 36.3/km^{2} (94.1/sq mi)
- Time zone: UTC+1 (CET)
  - Summer (DST): UTC+2 (CEST)
- Postal code: 594 01
- Website: www.pavlinov.cz

Pavlínov is a municipality and village in Žďár nad Sázavou District in the Vysočina Region of the Czech Republic. It has about 300 inhabitants.

Pavlínov lies approximately 24 kilometres (15 mi) south of Žďár nad Sázavou, 21 km (13 mi) east of Jihlava, and 132 km (82 mi) south-east of Prague.

== Demographics ==
Historical population
Year	Pop.	±%
1869	350	—
1880	377	+7.7%
1890	398	+5.6%
1900	407	+2.3%
1910	376	−7.6%
1921	379	+0.8%
1930	372	−1.8%
1950	264	−29.0%
1961	296	+12.1%
1970	290	−2.0%
1980	298	+2.8%
1991	277	−7.0%
2001	245	−11.6%
2011	246	+0.4%
2021	250	+1.6%
Source: Censuses
