= Desert exploration =

Deliberate and scientific exploration of deserts

Desert exploration is the deliberate and scientific exploration of deserts, the arid regions of the earth. It is only incidentally concerned with the culture and livelihood of native desert dwellers. People have struggled to live in deserts and the surrounding semi-arid lands for millennia. Nomads have moved their flocks and herds to wherever grazing is available, and oases have provided opportunities for a more settled way of life. Many, such as the Bushmen in the Kalahari, the Aborigines in Australia and various Indigenous peoples of the Americas, were originally hunter-gatherers. Many trade routes have been forged across deserts, especially across the Sahara Desert, and traditionally were used by caravans of camels carrying salt, gold, ivory and other goods. Large numbers of slaves were also taken northwards across the Sahara. Today, some mineral extraction also takes place in deserts, and the uninterrupted sunlight gives potential for the capture of large quantities of solar energy.

Many people think of deserts as consisting of extensive areas of billowing sand dunes because that is the way they are often depicted on TV and in films, but deserts do not always look like this. Across the world, around 20% of desert is sand, varying from only 2% in North America to 30% in Australia and over 45% in Central Asia. Where sand does occur, it is usually in large quantities in the form of sand sheets or extensive areas of dunes. The following sections list deserts around the world, and their explorers. Expeditions are listed by their leaders; details of other expedition members may be found via the links.

== Africa ==
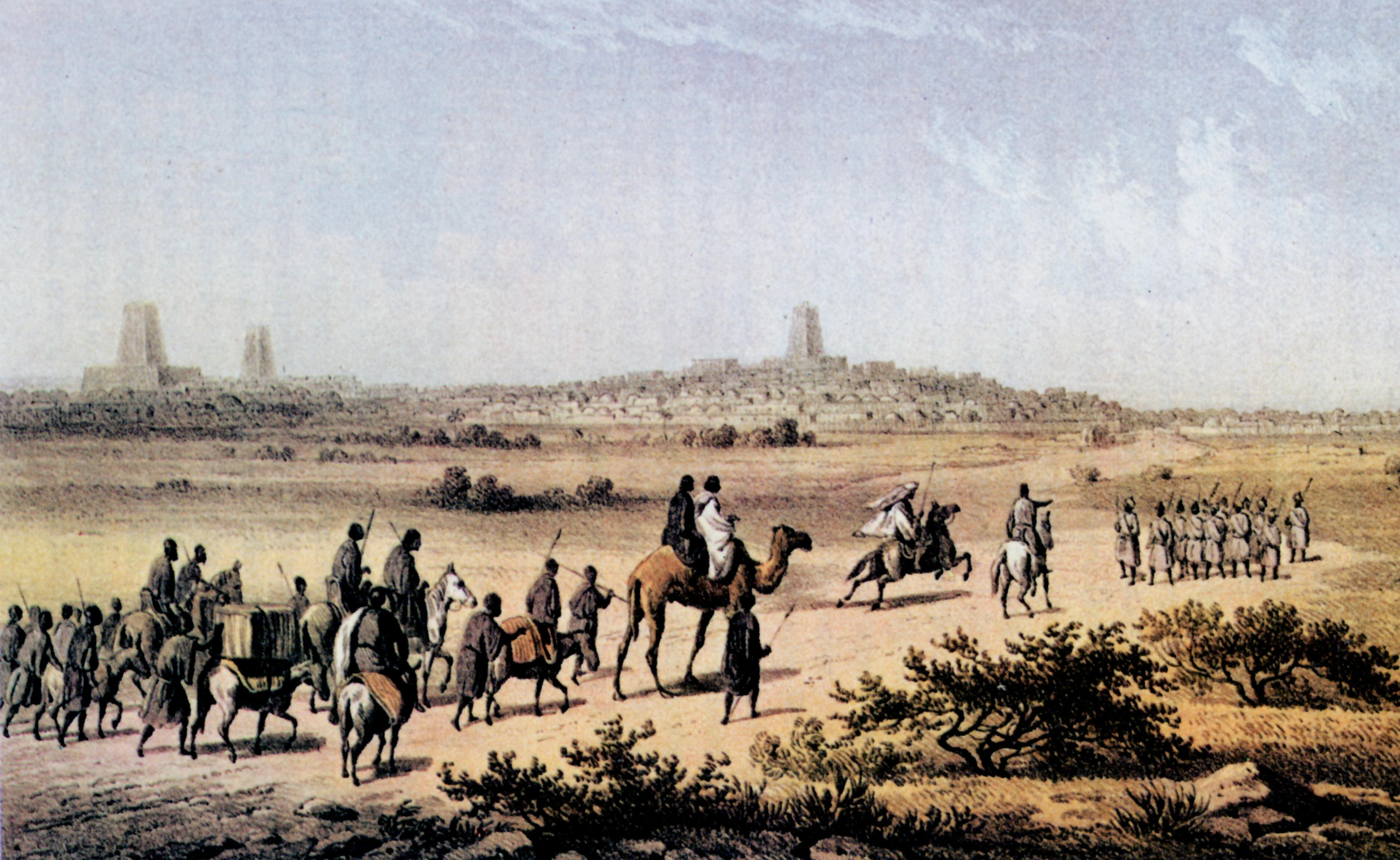
Heinrich Barth approaching Timbuktu on September 7, 1853, as depicted by Martin Bernatz.

- Kalahari Desert
- Sahara Desert
  - The Romans organized expeditions to cross the Sahara desert with five different routes. All these expeditions were supported by legionaries and had mainly a commercial purpose. One of the main reasons of the explorations was to get gold using the camel to transport it.:
    - through the western Sahara, toward the Niger River and present day Timbuktu.
    - through the Tibesti Mountains, toward Lake Chad and present day Nigeria
    - through the Nile river, toward present day Uganda.
    - though the western coast of Africa, toward the Canary Islands and the Cape Verde islands.
    - through the Red Sea, toward present day Somalia and perhaps Tanzania.
  - Michael Asher and Mariantonietta Peru – made the first recorded crossing of the Sahara from west to east, by camel and on foot, from Nouakchott, Mauretania, to Abu Simbel, Egypt, 1986–87, a distance of 4500 miles Ref: The Modern Explorers. Thames & Hudson. London 2013 Michael Asher lived for 3 years with the Kababish nomads in the Sudan.
  - Eva Dickson – was the first woman to cross the Sahara Desert by car. In 1932 she met the former spouse of Karen Blixen, Baron Bror von Blixen-Finecke, in Kenya, and they became lovers. After her meeting with Blixen in 1932, she took a bet and drove by car from Nairobi to Stockholm in 1932, thus becoming the first woman to have crossed the Sahara by car.
  - Heinrich Barth – crossed the Sahara during his travels in Africa and the Middle East during 1845–1847.
  - James Richardson – explored the Sahara and Sudan he died in the notorious hamada (a stony desert) in the Western Sahara.
  - Friedrich Gerhard Rohlfs – German geographer. First person the cross Africa north to south. Named a place Regenfeld near Dakhla Oasis in southern Egypt after experiencing a rare occurrence of desert rain.
  - Karl Alfred von Zittel German palaeontologist who accompanied Rohlfs.
  - Henri Duveyrier – He undertook a number of fossil-hunting explorations in the Sahara.
  - Albert-Félix de Lapparent – Explorer of the northern and western parts of the Sahara.
  - Victor Loche – first identified the sand cat (Felis margarita) while exploring the North Sahara.
  - Joseph Ritchie – sent to find the course of the River Niger and the location of Timbuktu. He died in Murzuk.
  - Helen Thayer – 20th-century walker and explorer.
  - Michiel Franken- First man to ride a sidecar (BMW i8) through the Sahara

== Asia ==
- Arabian Desert has been populated since prehistory. Rub' al Khali or the Empty Quarter in its remote center is one of the largest continuous bodies of sand in the world. It was recently explored by Europeans:
  - Bertram Thomas in 1931 and
  - St. John Philby in 1932: first documented journeys by Westerners
  - Wilfred Thesiger in 1946–50 crossed it several times and mapped large parts of it
  - In June 1950, a US Air Force expedition crossed the Rub' al Khali from Dhahran, Saudi Arabia, to central Yemen and back in trucks to collect specimens for the Smithsonian Institution and to test desert survival procedures.
  - Youngho Nam (Korean) in 2013 crossed on foot 1,000 km from "Salalah, Oman" to "Liwa, United Arab Emirates"
- Taklamakan Desert
  - Xuanzang, a monk in the 7th century
  - The archaeologist Aurel Stein in the 20th century.
  - Charles Blackmore 1993
- Gobi Desert has a long history of human habitation, mostly by nomadic peoples. The Gobi Desert as a whole was known only very imperfectly to outsiders, as information was confined to observations by individual travelers engaging in their respective itineraries across the desert. Among the European and American explorers who contributed to the understanding of the Gobi, the most important were the following:
  - Jean-François Gerbillon (1688–1698)
  - Eberhard Isbrand Ides (1692–1694)
  - Lorenz Lange (1727–1728 and 1736)
  - Fuss and Alexander G. von Bunge (1830–1831)
  - Hermann Fritsche (1868–1873)
  - Pavlinov and Z.L. Matusovski (1870)
  - Ney Elias (1872–1873)
  - Nikolai Przhevalsky (1870–1872 and 1876–1877)
  - Zosnovsky (1875)
  - Mikhail V. Pevtsov (1878)
  - Grigory Potanin (1877 and 1884–1886)
  - Béla Széchenyi and Lajos Lóczy (1879–1880)
  - The brothers Grigory Grum-Grshimailo (1889–1890) and M. Y. Grigory Grum-Grshimailo
  - Pyotr Kuzmich Kozlov (1893–1894 and 1899–1900)
  - Vsevolod I. Roborovsky (1894)
  - Vladimir Obruchev (1894–1896)
  - Karl Josef Futterer and Dr. Holderer (1896)
  - Charles-Etienne Bonin (1896 and 1899)
  - Sven Hedin (1897 and 1900–1901)
  - K. Bogdanovich (1898)
  - Ladyghin (1899–1900) and Katsnakov (1899–1900)
  - Jacques Bouly de Lesdain and Martha Mailey, 1902
  - Roy Chapman Andrews from the American Museum of Natural History who led several palaeontological expeditions to the Gobi Desert between 1922 and 1930
  - Zofia Kielan-Jaworowska who led Polish-Mongolian palaeontological expeditions in the mid-1960s.

== Australia ==
- Central Australia – general term covering the arid regions in the Australian interior
  - Jon Muir – made the first ever unassisted crossing of the Australian desert on foot
  - Edward John Eyre – expeditions to Lake Eyre and the Flinders Ranges in the 1830.
  - Charles Sturt – expeditions from Adelaide in the 1840s
  - John McDouall Stuart – accompanied Sturt 1844–1845; expeditions 1859 & 1860 (South Australia), 1861–1862 (south-north crossing of Australia)
  - Ludwig Leichhardt – expeditions 1844–1845 Moreton Bay to Port Essington, 1846–1847 and 1848 west from Moreton Bay, where the entire expedition vanished
  - Burke and Wills (Robert O'Hara Burke and William John Wills) – south-north crossing of Australia 1860–1861 where both died on the return journey
  - Augustus Gregory – searched for Leichhardt in 1858
  - Ernest Giles – expeditions 1872–1876
  - William Tietkens – expedition in 1889
- Gibson Desert
  - Ernest Giles – crossed the desert in 1874
- Great Sandy Desert
- Great Victoria Desert
  - John McDouall Stuart – skirted the desert in 1858
  - Ernest Giles – crossed the desert in 1875
- Nullarbor Plain – desert plain on the western part of the south coast of Australia
  - Edward John Eyre – expedition 1840–1841
- Tanami Desert
- Simpson Desert and Sturt Stony Desert
  - Charles Sturt – expedition 1844–1845
  - Cecil Madigan – expedition 1939 across the Simpson Desert
  - Warren Bonython and Charles McCubbin were the first North to South traverse on foot in 1973. They pulled a cart with supplies and used two air drops of water and supplies.
  - Louis-Philippe Loncke – unsupported expedition 2008 across the Simpson Desert on foot from North to South
- Western Australia – a large and generally arid region
  - Robert Austin – expedition 1854
  - Alexander Forrest – expeditions in the 1870s and 1880s
  - John Forrest – expeditions in the 1870s and 1880s
  - David Carnegie – expedition in 1896-7
  - Larry Wells – expedition in 1896-7

== North America ==
Before the European exploration of North America, tribes of Native Americans, such as the Mohave (in the Mojave desert), the Chemehuevi (in the Great Basin desert), and the Quechan (in the Colorado desert) were hunter-gatherers living in the California deserts. European explorers started exploring the deserts beginning in the 18th century. Francisco Garcés, a Franciscan friar, was the first explorer of the Colorado and Mojave deserts in 1776. Garcés recorded information about the original inhabitants of the deserts.

Later, as American interests expanded into California, American explorers started probing the California deserts. Jedediah Smith travelled through the Great Basin and Mojave deserts in 1826, finally reaching the San Gabriel Mission. John C. Frémont explored the Great Basin, proving that water did not flow out of it to the ocean, and provided maps that the forty-niners used to get to California.

== See also ==
- Saharan explorers
