= The English Patient =

1992 novel by Michael Ondaatje

- First edition cover
- Author: Michael Ondaatje
- Cover artist: Cecil Beaton
- Language: English
- Genre: Historiographic metafiction
- Publisher: McClelland and Stewart
- Publication date: September 1992
- Publication place: Canada
- Media type: Print (hardback and paperback)
- Pages: 320
- ISBN: 0-7710-6886-7
- OCLC: 26257641
- Preceded by: In the Skin of a Lion

The English Patient is a 1992 novel by Canadian writer Michael Ondaatje. The book follows four dissimilar people brought together at an Italian villa during the Italian campaign of World War II: an unrecognizably burned man—the eponymous patient who is presumed to be English—his Canadian Army nurse; a Sikh sapper; and a Canadian self-described thief. The story is primarily set during the North African campaign and centers on the incremental revelations of the patient's actions prior to his injuries, and the emotional effects of these revelations on the other characters. The story is told through the characters' perspectives and "authors" of books the characters are reading.

The book is a sequel to the 1987 novel In the Skin of a Lion. It continues the story of characters Hana and Caravaggio, and reveals the fate of Patrick Lewis, the main character of the 1987 novel. It won the 1992 Booker Prize, the 1992 Governor General's Award, and the 2018 Golden Man Booker.

The English Patient was adapted as a 1996 film of the same name, starring Ralph Fiennes and Kristin Scott Thomas.

In 2022, the novel was included on the "Big Jubilee Read" list of 70 books by Commonwealth authors, selected to celebrate the Platinum Jubilee of Elizabeth II.

== Plot synopsis ==
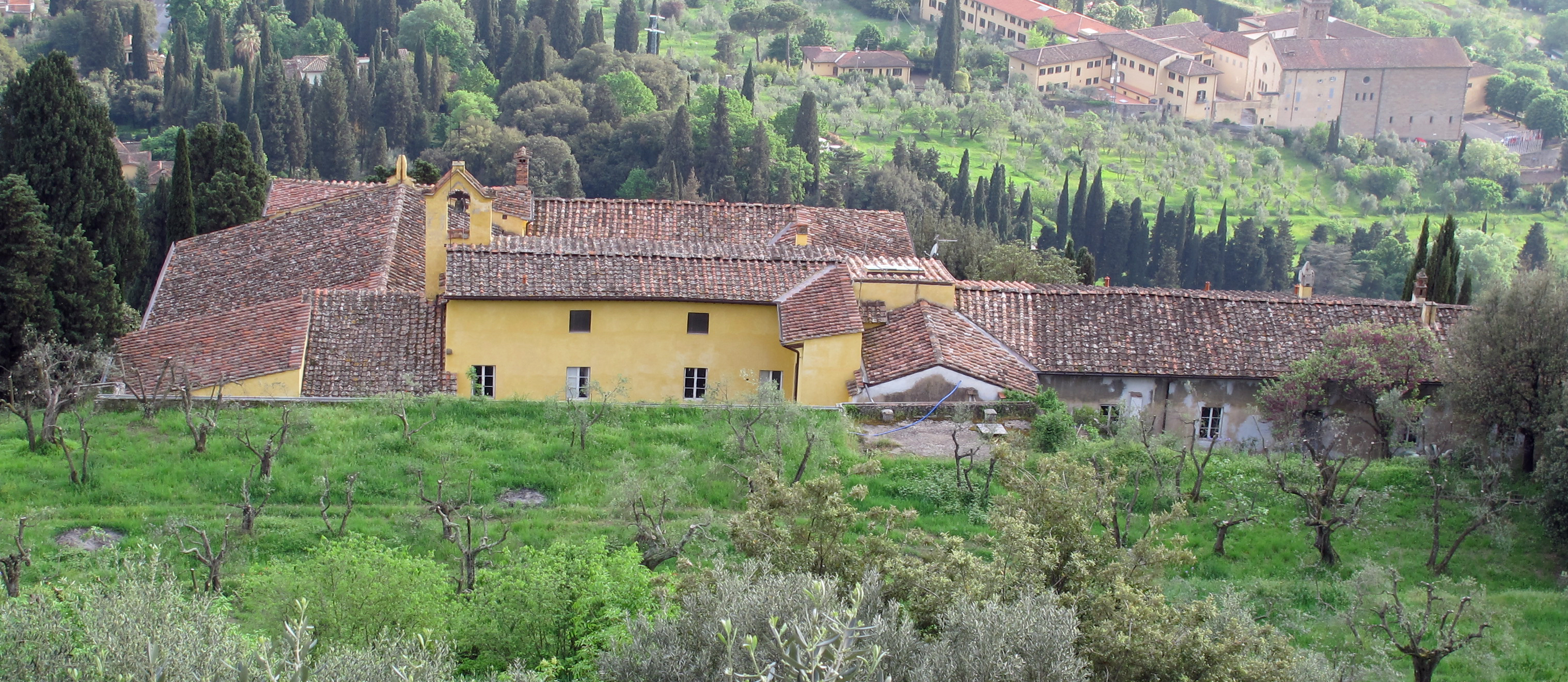
Villa San Girolamo in Fiesole (Florence)

The novel's historical backdrop is the North African and Italian campaigns of World War II. The story is told out of sequence, moving back and forth between the severely burned "English" patient's memories from before his accident and current events at the bomb-damaged Church of San Girolamo in Fiesole, where he is being cared for by Hana, a troubled young Canadian Army nurse. A few chapters are also devoted to Kip, a Sikh soldier, during his time in England training and working as a sapper on unexploded ordnance.

The patient's only possession is a well-worn and heavily annotated copy of Herodotus's The Histories that has survived the fiery parachute drop. Hearing the book constantly being read aloud to him brings about detailed recollections of his desert explorations, yet he is unable to recall his own name. Instead, he chooses to believe the assumption by others that he is an Englishman based on his accent. Caravaggio, the fourth person in the villa, suspects the patient is in fact Ladislaus de Almásy, a Hungarian count and desert explorer who was part of a British cartography group.

Caravaggio, an Italian-Canadian working for British intelligence, is a friend of Hana’s father, Patrick and her stepmother, Clara. He had remained in North Africa to spy when the German forces gain control and then transfers to Italy. He is eventually caught, interrogated, and tortured, resulting in his thumbs being cut off. He is prematurely released and is standing on the Ponte Santa Trinita bridge when it is destroyed. He recovers at a hospital for over four months before he accidentally overhears about the patient and Hana. Caravaggio bears physical and psychological scars from his painful war experience.

During a thunderstorm, Kip and another soldier arrive at the villa while Hana is playing on the piano. Kip decides to stay at the villa to attempt to clear it of unexploded ordnance. Kip and the English patient become friends due to the latter's extensive knowledge on both Allied and Axis weaponry and a detailed topography of Tuscany. At one point, Hana risks her life while Kip is defusing a bomb telling him later that at the time she had hoped both of them would die. Shortly after, Kip and Hana develop feelings for one another and begin a relationship.

The English patient, sedated by morphine, begins to reveal everything: he fell in love with the Englishwoman Katharine Clifton who, with her husband Geoffrey, accompanied Almásy's desert exploration team. Almásy was mesmerised by Katharine's voice as she read Herodotus' tale of Candaules aloud by the campfire. They soon began a very intense affair, but she cut it short, claiming that Geoffrey would go mad if he were to discover them.

As the war begins and the archaeological expedition is forced to abandon the desert camp, Katharine Clifton’s husband, Geoffrey, discovers her affair with Almásy. In a jealous and reckless act, Geoffrey flies a plane with Katharine aboard and deliberately crashes it into Almásy’s camp. Geoffrey is killed instantly, while Almásy survives and Katharine is seriously injured.

Almásy carries Katharine to the Cave of Swimmers for shelter and promises to return with help. He undertakes a long and arduous journey to the British-controlled town of El Tag. When questioned by British authorities, Almásy gives his own name and claims that the injured woman is his wife, rather than identifying her as Katharine Clifton, whose name was well known to the British through her husband’s work. As a result, his story is not taken seriously, and no immediate rescue is mounted.

In the years that follow, Almásy cooperates with German forces in North Africa, culminating in Operation Salam, during which he guides the German agent Johannes Eppler into Cairo. After completing this mission, Almásy is given the means to return to the desert. He retrieves a colleague's plane buried in the sand, and flies back to the Cave of Swimmers, where Katharine has by then been dead for several years.

Almásy recovers Katharine’s body and attempts to fly her out of the desert. During the flight, the plane suffers a mechanical failure and catches fire. Almásy breaks through the cockpit glass and parachutes to the ground while burning. He is found and rescued by Bedouin tribesmen, suffering the severe burns that later leave him unrecognizable.

Towards the end of the novel, Kip learns through his headset that the US has bombed Hiroshima and Nagasaki and a situation develops where he nearly shoots Almásy. Hana calms him down and Caravaggio reflects that they would not have dropped that kind of bomb on a white nation. Kip departs from the villa, estranged from his white companions, and returns to India. He marries and has two children, though he still thinks of Hana.

== Characters ==
=== Almásy ===
Count Ladislaus de Almásy is the titular character who comes under Hana's care in Italy after being burned unrecognisably in Africa. Although Hungarian by birth, because he has lived without government identification or many verifiable long-term interactions, his accent prompts the authorities around him to perceive an English affiliation and to refer to him as the English patient. Almásy serves as a blank canvas onto which the other characters project their experience during this time in Italy. For example, Hana treats him tenderly to redeem herself for not being by the side of her father when he was engulfed in flames and died. She provides comfort to the English Patient that she could not provide to her own father.

His lack of a national identity enables Almásy to rationalise his duplicitous actions with his associates. He socialises with, and is a mapmaker for, the British before the war, then uses that information to smuggle German spies across northern Africa. Almásy is portrayed in a sympathetic light, partly because he tells his own story, but also because he always adheres to his own moral code.

Almásy is also at the centre of one of the novel's love stories. He is involved in an adulterous relationship with Katharine Clifton, which eventually leads to her death and the death of her husband, Geoffrey Clifton. Katharine is the figure who leads Almásy to sensuality. He falls in love with her voice as she reads Herodotus. Sensuality, both sexual and observational, is a major theme in the novel.

The character is loosely based on László Almásy, a well-known desert explorer in 1930s Egypt, who helped the German side in the Second World War. Almásy did not suffer burns or die in Italy, but survived the war and lived until 1951.

=== Hana ===
Hana is a twenty-year-old Canadian Army nurse torn between her youth and her maturity. Being a good nurse, she quickly learns that she cannot become emotionally attached to her patients. She calls them all "buddy," and forgets them immediately once they die. Her lover, a Canadian officer, is killed and because of this, Hana comes to believe that she is cursed and that all those around her are doomed to die.

In contrast, upon hearing of her father's death Hana has an emotional breakdown. She then puts all of her energy into caring for the English Patient. She washes his wounds, reads to him and provides him with morphine. When the hospital is abandoned, Hana refuses to leave, staying with her patient. She sees Almásy as saint-like and falls in love with his pure nature.

In addition to her relationship with Almásy, Hana also forms a strong relationship with Kip during his stay at the villa.

Hana seems to not be able to acknowledge or even come to terms with her father's death. As she almost sees no reason in returning home and her excuse to stay in the now abandoned hospital is to take proper care of the English patient, due to Almasy not being able to move because of how severe his burns are externally and internally as well. On top of this Hana fails to reply or write back her step-mother, whom she loves and is the only living family she has left. Clara writes to Hana for a year whilst she is in Italy; Hana keeps every letter, but fails to write back even with such woe and guilt filling her heart.

Hana seems to be putting off her life as a young adult and at times shows her immaturity throughout the novel in ignoring Caravaggio's advice or suggestions or simply not facing the reality that awaits her back home. She seems as if escaping reality and being completely isolated from the rest of society is better than growing up. Hana escapes reality simply by stalling in taking care of the patient, rearranging her set up inside the deteriorating villa, listening to what Almásy has to say or the stories he tells, and by reading books to him over and over again.

Hana claims to have changed and grown up mentally throughout being a nurse during the war, as one would expect, but her "growing up" seems to be much more of building up a wall and being stuck in this continuous process of trying to heal an already dead body.

=== Kip ===
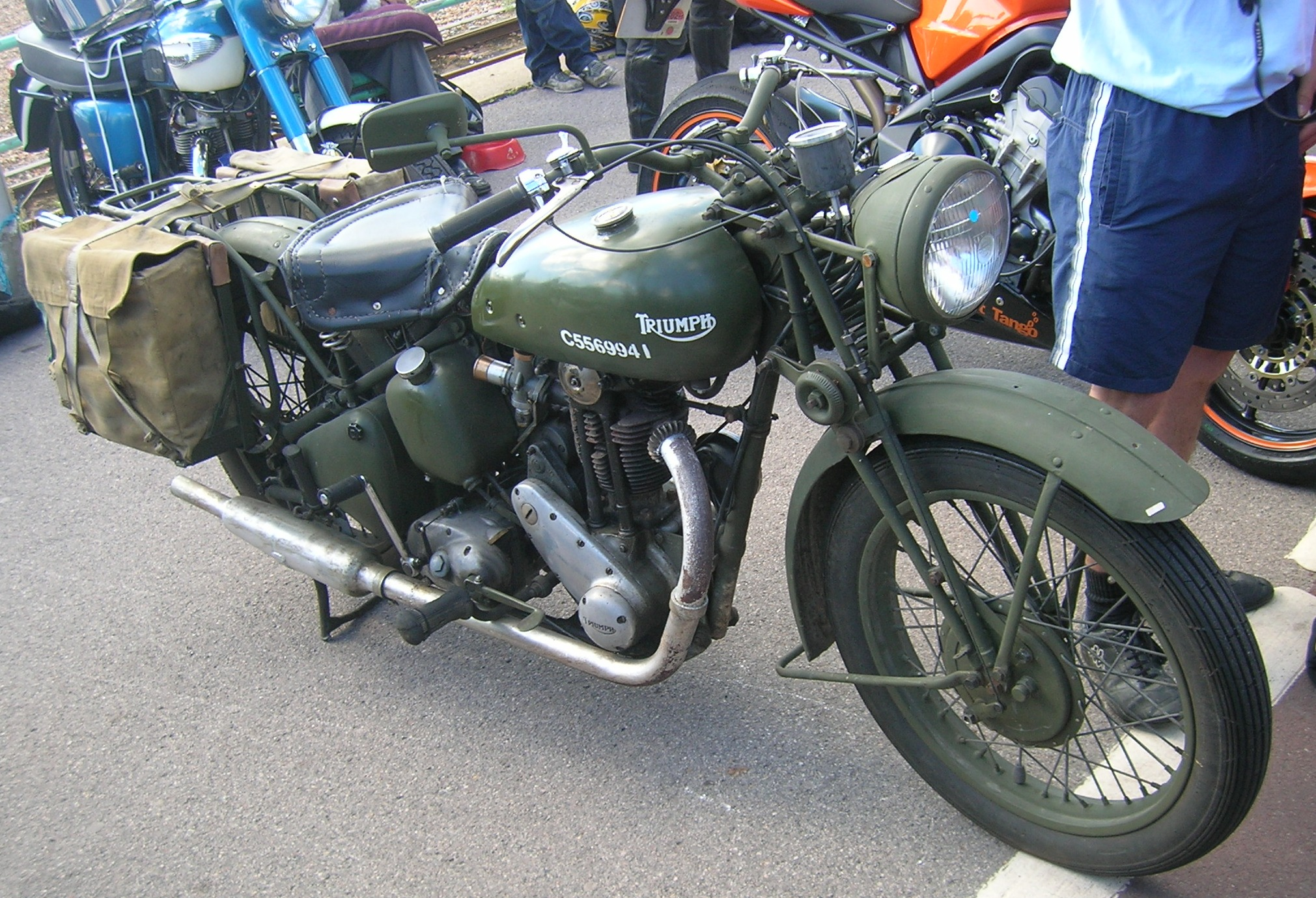
Triumph 3HW 350cc motorcycle used by Kip in the novel

Kirpal (Kip) Singh is an Indian Sikh who has volunteered with the British military for sapper bomb disposal training under Lord Suffolk. This act of patriotism is not shared by his Indian nationalist brother; the scepticism of his unit's white peers discourages a sense of community for Kip.

Lord Suffolk, an eccentric English nobleman, has developed techniques to dismantle complicated, unexploded bombs in what is a very dangerous occupation. Kip feels a sense of belonging in a community when he is welcomed into the Suffolk household and regards Lord Suffolk as a father figure. Lord Suffolk and his sapper team are killed while attempting to dismantle a new type of bomb. Their deaths cause Kip's emotional withdrawal to become more pronounced. Charles Howard, 20th Earl of Suffolk, was a real person who did dismantle bombs and was killed while attempting to dismantle one.

Kip is transferred to another unit in Italy where he and his partner hear a piano playing. As they enter the villa, they come across Hana while she is playing on a piano during a thunderstorm. Kip stays on at the villa to clear any remaining unexploded bombs, mines, or other booby-traps. Kip feels a sense of community and confidence when he becomes Hana's lover. Kip sees the interactions of the Westerners at the villa as those of a group that disregards nationality. They get together and celebrate Hana's twenty-first birthday, a symbol of their friendship and Kip's acceptance. However, when he learns of the nuclear bombing of Hiroshima Kip is thoroughly shocked. He leaves immediately while Caravaggio reflects that Westerners would never use such a weapon on their own race. Kip goes back to India and never returns, he marries and has two children though he never stops recalling the effect of Hana in his life.

=== David Caravaggio ===
David Caravaggio is a Canadian thief whose profession is legitimised by the war, as the Allies needed crafty people to steal Axis documents. He is a long-time friend of Hana's father and becomes known as "the man with bandaged hands" when he arrives at the villa; the bandages cover his severed thumbs, the result of an interrogation by the Italians in Florence. He recalls that Ranuccio Tommasoni ordered the interrogation tactic. This is a reference to a man by the same name who was murdered by the historical Caravaggio in 1606. The mental and physical outcome of the torture is that Caravaggio has "lost his nerve" and ability to steal. Hana remembers him as a very human thief. He would always be distracted by the human element while doing a job. For instance, if an advent calendar was on the wrong day, he would fix it. She also has deep feelings of love for Caravaggio. At times, Caravaggio seems to display a romantic love towards Hana, but also at one point wishes she would marry Kip. Caravaggio and Almásy share a morphine addiction. Caravaggio works this to his advantage to confirm his suspicion that Almásy is not English.

=== Katharine Clifton ===
Katharine is the childhood friend and newly-wed wife of Geoffrey Clifton, whom she marries after their days at Oxford University. The day after their wedding, she and Geoffrey fly to join Almásy's expedition. She entertains the camp in the evening by reading aloud from Almásy's copy of Herodotus' Histories, after which she and Almásy begin an affair. At one point Katharine stabs and punches Almásy repeatedly because she is angry that he doesn't want to change. Geoffrey discovers the affair after she has ended it, and she is wracked with guilt. Geoffrey attempts to kill all three of them by crashing his plane while they are flying. After Geoffrey is killed in the crash, Katharine admits that she always loved Almásy.

=== Geoffrey Clifton ===
Geoffrey is Katharine's husband, on a secret mission for the British government to make detailed aerial maps of North Africa; his joining the Almásy expedition is only a ruse. The plane he claims to be his own was appropriated by the Crown, and he leaves his wife with the other expedition members while on his mission, leading to her infidelity.

== Analysis ==
Christopher McVey has discussed the nature of Ondaatje's use of metaphysical aspects of body, history and nation in the novel. Amy Novak and Mirja Lobnik have separately analysed aspects of the treatment of memory in the novel. Thomas Harrison and Rachel Friedman have each examined the references and use of Herodotus in the novel. Madhumalati Adhikari has critiqued the treatment of the Second World War and its effects on the characters of the novel.

A major symbol of the novel is the desert. It serves as a representation of the characters' war experiences and how they came to gather in the villa. A passage in the novel notes "The desert could not be claimed or owned." Caravaggio had stepped away from the war for a brief time when he drifted into the villa and encountered an old flame, Hana. Kip elects to stay in the villa, a straggler from his unit, to continue searching for explosives. He also finds there is a serene sense of acceptance in the villa and that the people need him. Hana is devoted to her patients, to the very last. Thus, she stays behind in the villa hospital when numerous others abandon it. Almásy himself is forced into the villa, essentially because the desert took him when his plane was shot down.

A psychoanalytic analysis of "The English Patient" helps us to understand the meaning of Michael Ondaatje's emphasis on his characters' differences and appearances. He may have been thinking about how melting pot civilisations begin by different cultures working together in spite of each other's background. Note how each central character living in the reconstructed villa is almost as opposite of each other in appearance as they could be. Hana was young, healthy, and capable of caring for more than one person at a time, but she mainly attended to the English patient. In contrast to Hana, the English patient was handicapped and on his death bed. But little did Hana know, in the English patient's past, he had worked with the Germans on other desert expeditions way before their paths had crossed. However, his amnesia could not allow him to remember such things at the moment. In other words, Hana was caring for someone who was partly responsible for her village's demise. The moral of this is that Hana, the English patient, Kip and Caravaggio had fewer physical resemblances to each other than they had had of humanistic desires. Thus, Michael Ondaatje may have wanted us to see that what's on the outside does not matter as much as what's on the inside when rebuilding a village, city or country.

The emotional heart of this novel is found at the core of the character's want and need to survive, which in turn is the eternal damnation they find by everything seeming so bleak. Within this, the desert is a large symbol. As the Villa San Girolamo is an abandoned, war ridden place, it is also a place that seems like a cage, with no chance at happiness in sight. The war may be over, but the characters feel trapped in a sense. The desert within the novel is a place of freedom, a place that cannot be claimed or owned by any one person. The desert is everlasting, and can never be wavered. This is unlike the war that these characters had become extremely traumatised from. It is a vast nothingness that will always remain nation-less. A place that these characters can seek out in their minds, when there is nowhere else to turn for hope.

== Awards ==
The novel won the 1992 Booker Prize, the 1992 Governor General's Award and the 2018 Golden Man Booker award.

== Film adaptation ==
The novel was adapted into the 1996 film with the same title by Anthony Minghella, starring Ralph Fiennes, Kristin Scott Thomas, Willem Dafoe, Colin Firth, Naveen Andrews and Juliette Binoche. The film received nine Academy Awards—including Best Picture and Director—at the 69th Academy Awards.

== Canceled television adaptation ==
A television adaptation of the book was planned by the BBC. The project was to be written by Emily Ballou and co-produced between Miramax Television and Paramount Television Studios. However, in March 2023, it was reported that it was no longer moving forward.

== Bibliography ==
- Ondaatje, Michael (1993). The English Patient. New York: Vintage Books. ISBN 0-679-74520-3.
- Tötösy de Zepetnek, Steven. "Ondaatje's The English Patient and Questions of History". Comparative Cultural Studies and Michael Ondaatje's Writing. Ed. Steven Tötösy de Zepetnek. West Lafayette: Purdue University Press, 2005. 115–132.
- Tötösy de Zepetnek, Steven. "Michael Ondaatje's 'The English Patient,' 'History,' and the Other". CLCWeb: Comparative Literature and Culture 1.4 (1999).
