= Leonard Mosley =

British writer (1913–1992)

- Born: 11 February 1913; Manchester, England
- Died: June 1992 (aged 79)
- Occupations: Journalist, biographer

Leonard Oswald Mosley OBE OStJ (11 February 1913 – June 1992) was a British journalist, historian, biographer and novelist. His works include five novels and biographies of General George Marshall, Reichsmarschall Hermann Göring, Orde Wingate, Walt Disney, Charles Lindbergh, Du Pont family, Eleanor Dulles, Allen Welsh Dulles, John Foster Dulles and Darryl F. Zanuck. He also worked as chief war correspondent for London's The Sunday Times.

== Biography ==
Leonard Oswald Mosley was born in Manchester, England on 11 February 1913, the son of Leonard Cyril Mosley and Annie Althea Mosley née Glaiser. He was not related to the British fascist leader Oswald Mosley. He was educated at William Hulme's Grammar School. At the age of seventeen he started work as a reporter for the Telegraph, a weekly paper, since defunct, which circulated in South Lancashire and North Cheshire. After a year working there he lost his job as a result of an ill-timed practical joke, and then spent six months as a freelance, living in his parental home in Didsbury. During the summer of 1931 he left England and made his way to America.

In New York he spent three months as an Assistant Stage Manager for a burlesque show, then for half a year worked as a journalist for the New York Daily Mirror. In May 1932 he left the East Coast and drove to California in an old Ford Model T. He arrived in Los Angeles just in time for the 1932 Summer Olympics, which he covered as an employee of United Press. He subsequently worked as a freelance journalist in Hollywood. He reported on the 1933 Long Beach earthquake, returning to England shortly afterwards.

He found employment as a roving reporter, a job that took him all over the world. One early assignment which brought him back to the United States and made a great impression on him was the trial of Richard Hauptmann for the Lindbergh kidnapping. Many years later he would write a biography of Lindbergh.

He died in 1992, aged 79.

== Books ==
- So I Killed Her. Michael Joseph Ltd. 1936.
- No More Remains. Michael Joseph Ltd. 1936.
- So Far So Good : An Autobiography. Michael Joseph Ltd. 1937. OCLC 5072478.
- War Lord. Michael Joseph Ltd. 1938.
- Down Stream: the Uncensored Story of 1936–1939. Michael Joseph Ltd. 1939. - published in US as Europe Down-Stream
- Parachutes Over Holland. Cherry Tree. 1940.
- Report from Germany. Left Book Club. Gollancz. 1945. OCLC 1489740.
- They Can't Hang Me. - in 1955 made into the film They Can't Hang Me
- Gideon Goes to War: A Biography of Orde Wingate. Arthur Barker Ltd. 1955. OCLC 3465327.
- Castlerosse. Arthur Barker Ltd. 1956. - about Valentine Browne, 6th Earl of Kenmare
- The Cat and the Mice. Arthur Barker Ltd. 1958. OCLC 3494629.- the story of John Eppler, later made into the film Foxhole in Cairo
- The Seductive Mirror. Arthur Barker Ltd. 1958.
- Curzon: The End of an Epoch. Longmans, Green, and Co., London. 1960. (Published in United States as The Glorious Fault: The Life of Lord Curzon).
- The Last Days of the British Raj. Weidenfeld and Nicolson. 1961. OCLC 411013.
- Faces from the Fire: The Biography of Sir Archibald McIndoe. Weidenfeld & Nicolson. 1962.
- Duel for Kilimanjaro: An Account of the East African Campaign 1914–1918. Weidenfeld & Nicolson. 1963. OCLC 298513665.
- Haile Selassie: The Conquering Lion. Weidenfeld and Nicolson. 1964. OCLC 45666880.
- (with Robert Haswell) (1966). The Royals. Frewin.
- Hirohito: Emperor of Japan. Prentice Hall / Weidenfeld and Nicolson. 1966. OCLC 406462.
- On Borrowed Time: How World War Two Began. Weidenfeld and Nicolson. 1968. ISBN 9780297178156. OCLC 12555.
- Battle of Britain: The Making of a Film. Stein and Day. 1969. ISBN 0812812395. OCLC 27307.
- Backs to the Wall;: The Heroic Story of the People of London during World War II. Weidenfeld and Nicolson. 1971. ISBN 0394460804.
- Marshall, Hero for Our Times. Hearst Books. 1972. OCLC 8219365. - about George Marshall; published in US as Marshall: Organizer of Victory (but not to be confused with the book of identical title by Forrest C. Pogue)
- Power Play : The Tumultuous World of Middle East Oil, 1890–1973. Weidenfeld and Nicolson. 1973. OCLC 539719.
- The Reich Marshal: A Biography of Hermann Goering. Weidenfeld and Nicolson. 1974. OCLC 748995702.
- Lindbergh: A Biography. Doubleday. 1976. ISBN 0385095783. OCLC 2034813. - Biography of Charles Lindbergh
- Dulles: A Biography of Eleanor, Allen, and John Foster Dulles and their Family Network. Hodder & Stoughton. 1978. ISBN 080371744X. OCLC 3543239.
- Blood Relations: The Rise and Fall of the Du Ponts of Delaware. Atheneum. 1980. ISBN 0689110553. OCLC 5800214.
- The Druid: The Nazi Spy Who Double-Crossed The Double-Cross System. Atheneum. 1981. ISBN 0413402800.
- Zanuck: The Rise and Fall of Hollywood's Last Tycoon. HarperCollins. 1984.
- Disney's World : A Biography. Scarborough House. 1985. ISBN 9781589796560. OCLC 12163226. - published in UK as The Real Walt Disney

== Honours ==
- In June 1946 he was appointed an OBE (Officer of the Order of the British Empire) for his work at Kemsley Newspapers. (He was then on the staff of the Daily Express).
- In June 1964 he was appointed as an officer of the Order of the Hospital of St. John of Jerusalem.
