= Joseph Ritchie =

English surgeon, explorer and naturalist

Joseph Ritchie (c. 1788 – 20 November 1819) was an English surgeon, explorer and naturalist. His primary interest lay in the natural sciences, though he is best known for playing a minor role in the British exploration of Africa.

== Life ==
In 1818, Ritchie was directed by Sir John Barrow to find the course of the River Niger and the location of Timbuktu. Ritchie chose subordinate George Francis Lyon to accompany him. The expedition was underfunded and lacked necessary support. Based on the recommendation of Barrow, they left from Tripoli and thus had to cross the entire Sahara, an arduous journey no modern European had ever done before. A year later, due to many delays, they had only reached as far as Murzuk, the capital of Fezzan, where they both fell ill with fever. They ran out of funds, and food, subsisting on dates and handouts from the local villagers who were little better off. Ritchie never recovered and died there, having made no new discoveries.

Ritchie was distinctly unsuited to exploration. He was "deeply self-centered, morose and uncommunicative". After arriving in Murzuk, he cut himself off from locals and even his own people. He was reserved, took little interest in the people and places he saw, took few notes, and generally spent much of his time indoors studying mathematics. Instead of stocking food and trade goods before departing Tripoli, Richie squandered the limited expedition funds on profligate items. After Ritchie died, George Lyon opened the crates they hauled through the desert and found things like 600 pounds of lead, a camel-load of cork for preserving insects, and two camel-loads of brown paper for pressing plants. Lyon sold what he could and was able to make it back to Tripoli, alive.

In 1831, R.Br. ex G.Don published Ritchiea, a genus of flowering plants from Tropical Africa, belonging to the family Capparaceae and named in Joseph Ritchie's honour.
