= Gilf Kebir National Park =

National park in New Valley Governorate, Egypt

- Location within Egypt Location within Africa
- Location: New Valley Governorate, Egypt
- Coordinates: 23°45′00″N 25°50′00″E
- Area: 48,533 km^{2} (18,739 sq mi)
- Established: 2007

Gilf Kebir National Park (GKNP) (Arabic: محمية الجلف الكبير) is a national park located in the remote and hyper-arid New Valley Governorate, Egypt. Established in 2007, it has a surface area of 48533 km^{2}, equal to about 5% of Egypt's territory. GKNP is delimited to the west by Libya and to the south by Sudan. At present there are no human settlements or facilities inside the GKNP.

== Ecosystems and cultural values ==
The park consists of three different ecosystems: the southern ranges of the Great Sand Sea including the Silica glass area, the proper Gilf Kebir plateau and the Egyptian portion of the Gabal El Uweinat massif.

The Great Sand Sea is a large complex of sand dunes extending from the Siwa oasis in the north to the Gilf Kebir in the south. Its south western part is covered by the Silica Glass area, which is scattered with fragments of pure glass, formed about 30 million years ago due to the explosion of a meteorite or comet.

The Gilf Kebir is a plateau, furrowed by immense north trending wadis. The area was settled by a population already at the beginning of the Neolithic area some 9000 years ago during the African humid period, leaving splendid rock paintings and engravings of uncertain age in the wadi Hamra and in the caves of Beasts, Swimmers, Archers and Magharet el Kantara on its southern foothills.

The Gebel Uweinat, situated about 150 km south of the Gilf Kebir and most of which lies in Sudanese and Libyan territories, is another massif important for its abundant rock art.

The presence of humans in the 20th century CE is evidenced by the remains of the Long Range Desert Group WWII-camps such as trucks and an airfield at Eight Bells Hills.

== Flora and fauna ==
The GKNP contains important desert-adapted flora (trees: Vachellia tortilis, shrubs: Zilla spinosa and Zygophyllum arabicum), and fauna (Barbary sheep).

== Gallery ==
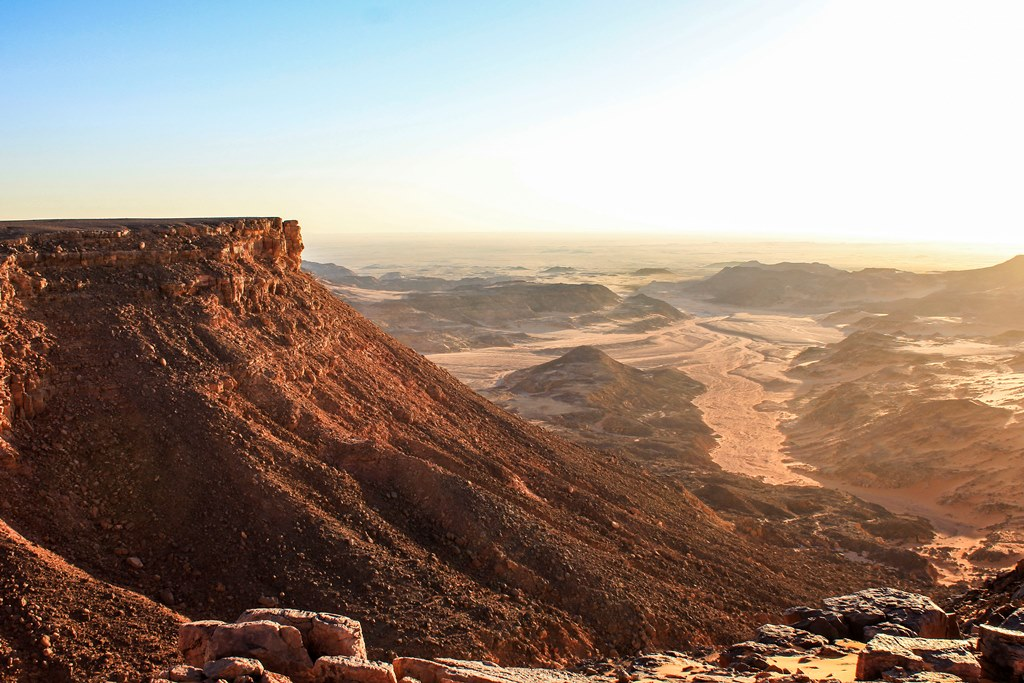
View from the Gilf Kebir ridge to the south into wadi Sura

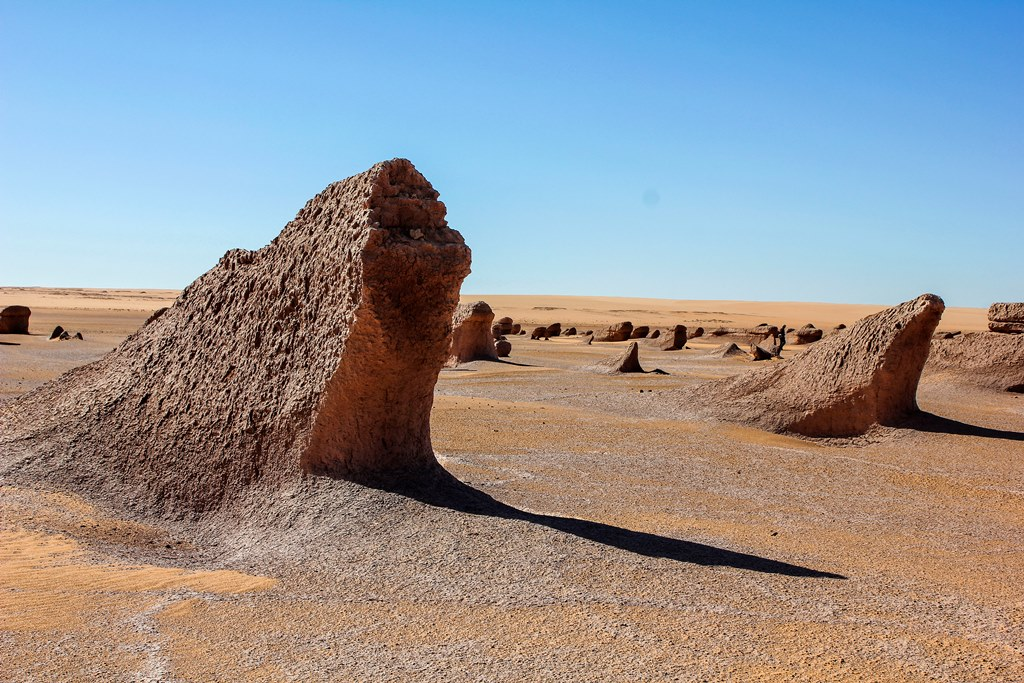
Yardangs near the Eight Bells Hills WWII air field

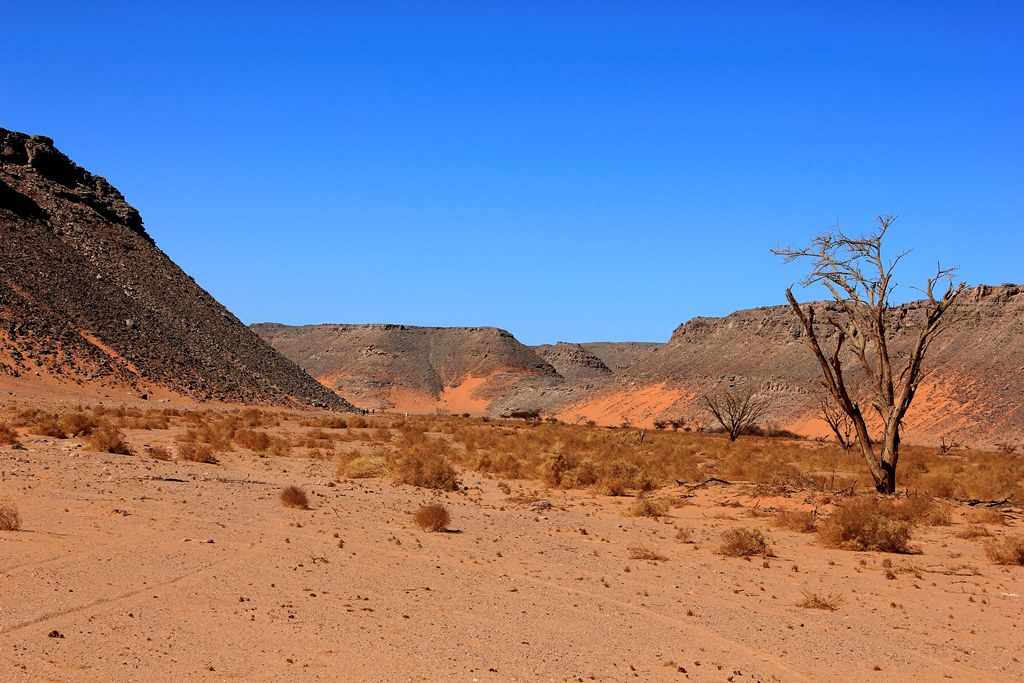
Wadi Hamra
