= Cave of Archers =

Rock art shelter in Egypt

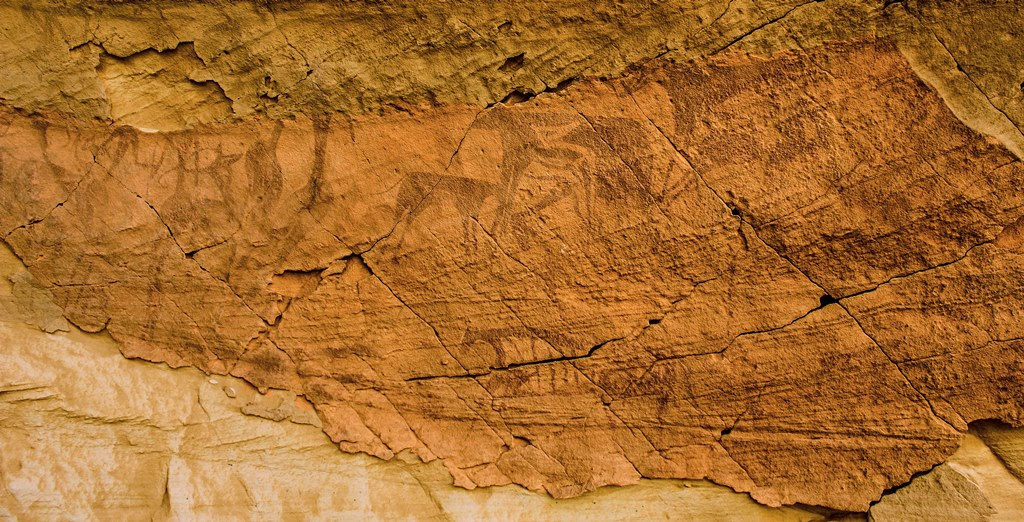
- Rock paintings of the Cave of Archers

- Location in Egypt
- 23°35′41″N 25°14′1″E
- Type: Rock art
- Periods: Neolithic
- Location: New Valley, Egypt

History
- Built: c. 6000 BC

Cave of Archers is a rock art shelter of the Gilf Kebir National Park in the New Valley Governorate, Egypt. It is located on the south-eastern slopes of Gilf Kebir, 40 m to the south of the Cave of Swimmers.

== Description ==
The south-west oriented entrance of the cave is 10 m wide and 5 m tall and opens into a large cupuliform formation modeled in the sandstone. The rock paintings of the cave feature a few panels of persons with bows and arrows as well as a herd of bovines. The paintings are dated between 6300 BC and 5500 BC during the African humid period, much different from the present hyper-arid one.

Due to bedrock deterioration, the sandstone is heavily weathered or fragmented and only a few painted sandstone blocks remain.
