= Team sport =

Sport with players in opposing teams

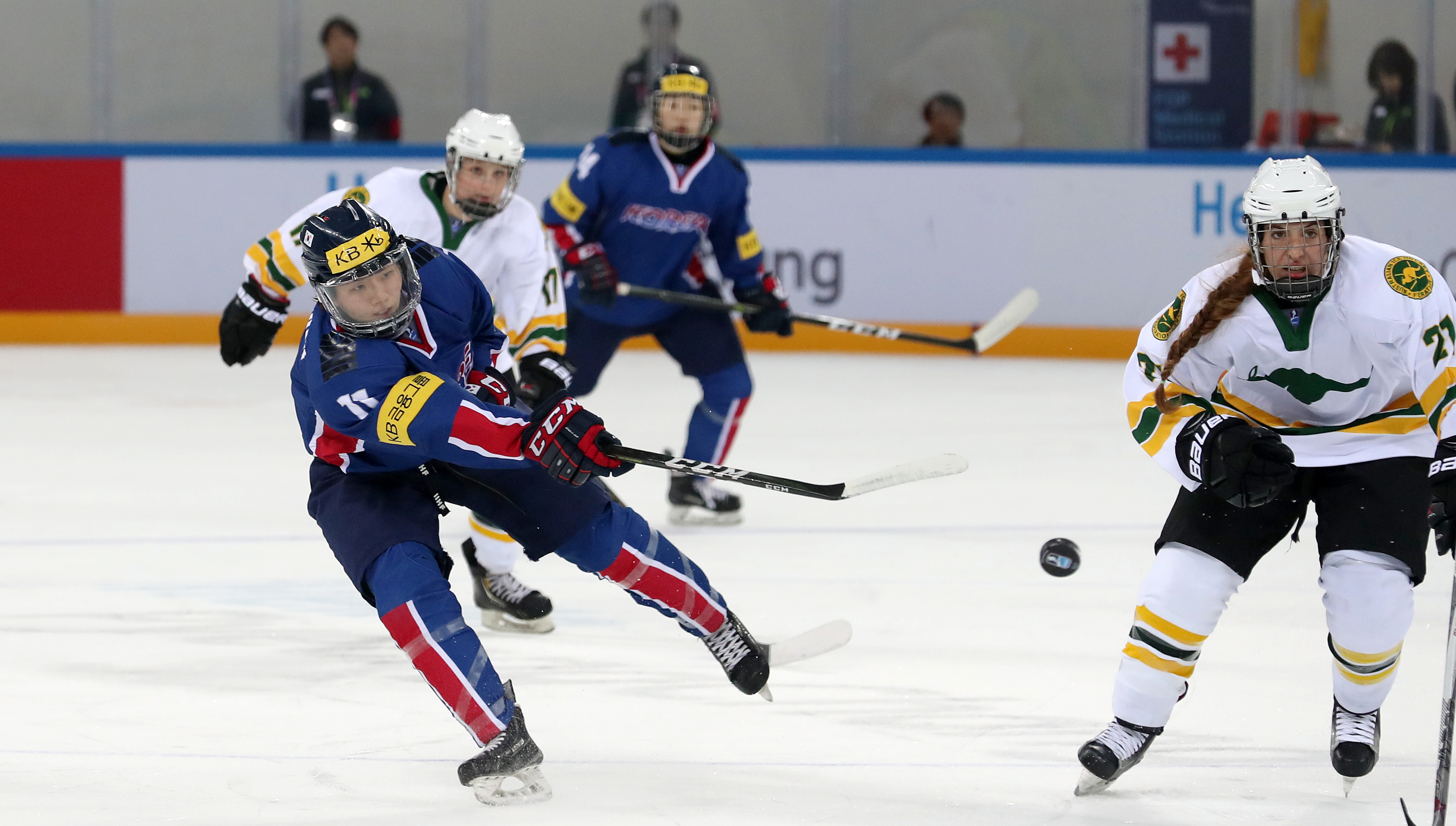
Ice hockey, a popular winter team sport

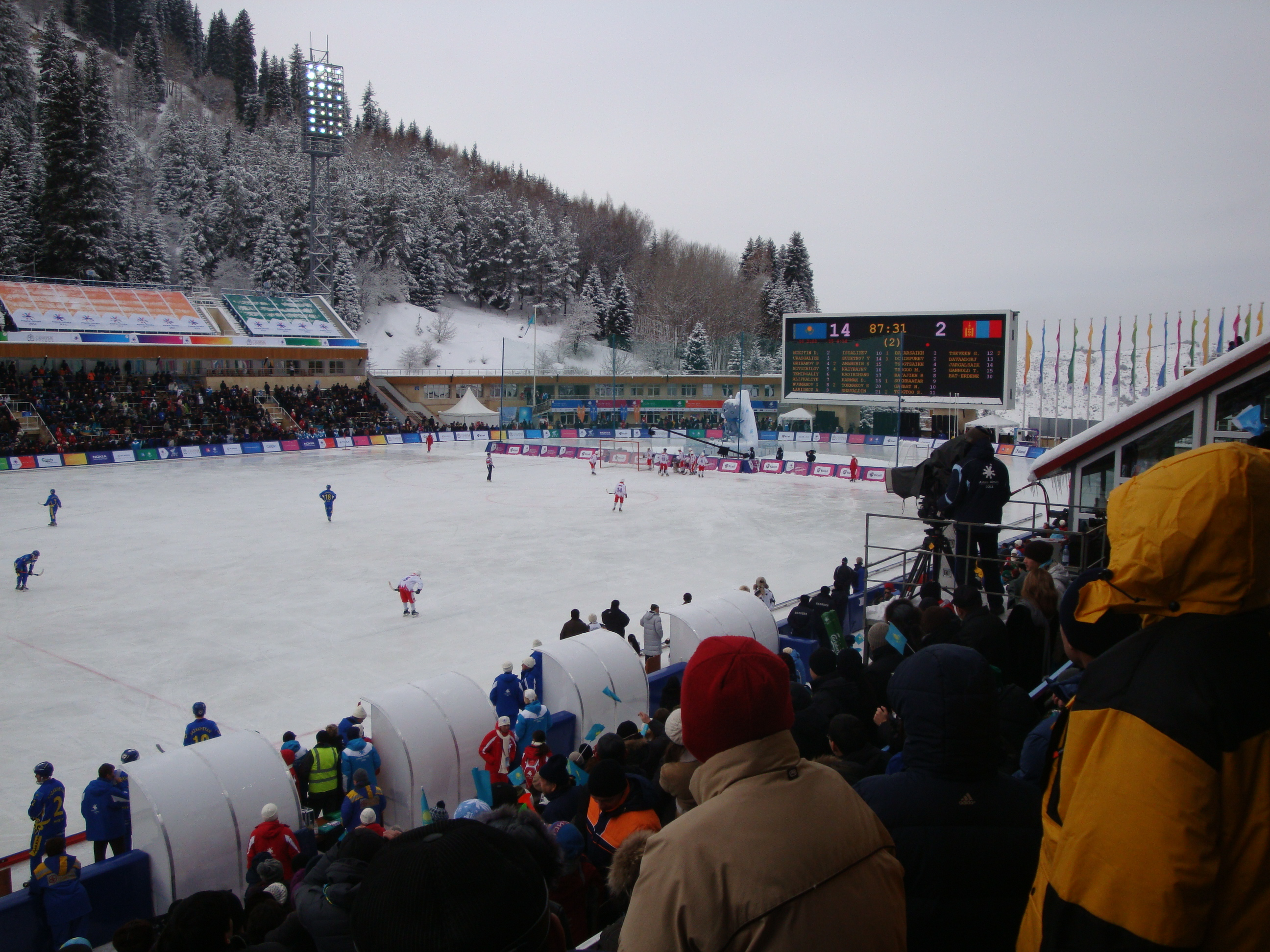
Bandy, a popular Nordic winter team sport

A team sport is a type of sport where the fundamental nature of the game or sport requires the participation of multiple individuals working together as a team, and it is inherently impossible or highly impractical to execute the sport as a single-player endeavour. In team sports, the cooperative effort of team members is essential for the sport to function and achieve its objectives. The objective often involves teammates facilitating the movement of a ball or similar object in accordance with a set of rules in order to score points. Examples are basketball, netball, volleyball, rugby league, rugby union, water polo, handball, lacrosse, cricket, baseball, and the various forms of football and hockey. These sports emphasize teamwork, strategy, and coordination among team members while competing against opposing teams to achieve a common goal. Team sports do not include individual or individual-to-team events within a sport.

== Distinctions ==
The meaning of a "team sport" has been disputed in recent years. Some types of sports have different objectives or rules than "traditional" team sports. These types of team sports do not involve teammates facilitating the movement of a ball or similar object in accordance with a set of rules in order to score points. Overall, the division into team sports and individual sports is not always unproblematic since there are different combinations in the individual sports.

=== Team sports and individual-to-team events ===
==== Pure team sports ====
This includes sports that can only be practiced as a team sport. The number of team members is fixed for the team. In order to compete successfully in championships and tournaments, teams need a roster that is significantly larger than the number of players starting the game. Players may be substituted from a squad in competition matches to replace exhausted or injured players or to make tactical changes. Examples are netball, basketball, volleyball, rugby union, rugby league, water polo, handball, lacrosse, cricket, baseball, and the various forms of football and hockey.

Teams of two people are common in certain sports, such as dancesport or beach volleyball. No substitute players are used here. The two partners are absolutely dependent on each other. The absence of a person here means a loss of competitiveness.

==== Formations ====
There are sports that are commonly played by individuals, or singles, but may also be played in a cooperative partner formation referred to as doubles. This includes sports such as badminton, table tennis, and tennis. In these formations, common tactics, teamwork, and agreements are crucial for success. There are also different rowing formations, such as one, two, four, and eight, or sailing with their different boat classes. The most important thing here is smooth movements and common tactics. This also applies approximately to the team time trial in cycling, which is the case with cycling tours and one-day races, which are different tasks for the team members of a cycling team.

==== Relays ====
In some sports, relay races are held, which can be distinguished from pure team evaluations by a common racing tactic and the observance of change regulations. Relay races are common in running, swimming, cross-country skiing, biathlon, or short-track speed skating and are also an integral part of the Olympic Games program with high popularity.

==== Team ratings ====
There are team ratings in many sports, and the results of individual athletes or formations are added up. In cycling, team members, whilst still in competition with each other, will also work towards assisting one member of the team, usually a specialist, to the highest possible finishing position. In some sports where participants are entered by a team, they do not only compete against members of other teams, but also against each other for points towards championship standings, for example, in motorsport, particularly Formula One. Team orders can occur in such teams and although previously accepted were banned in Formula One between 2002 and 2010. After a controversy involving team orders at the 2010 German Grand Prix however, the regulation was removed as of the 2011 season.

== History ==
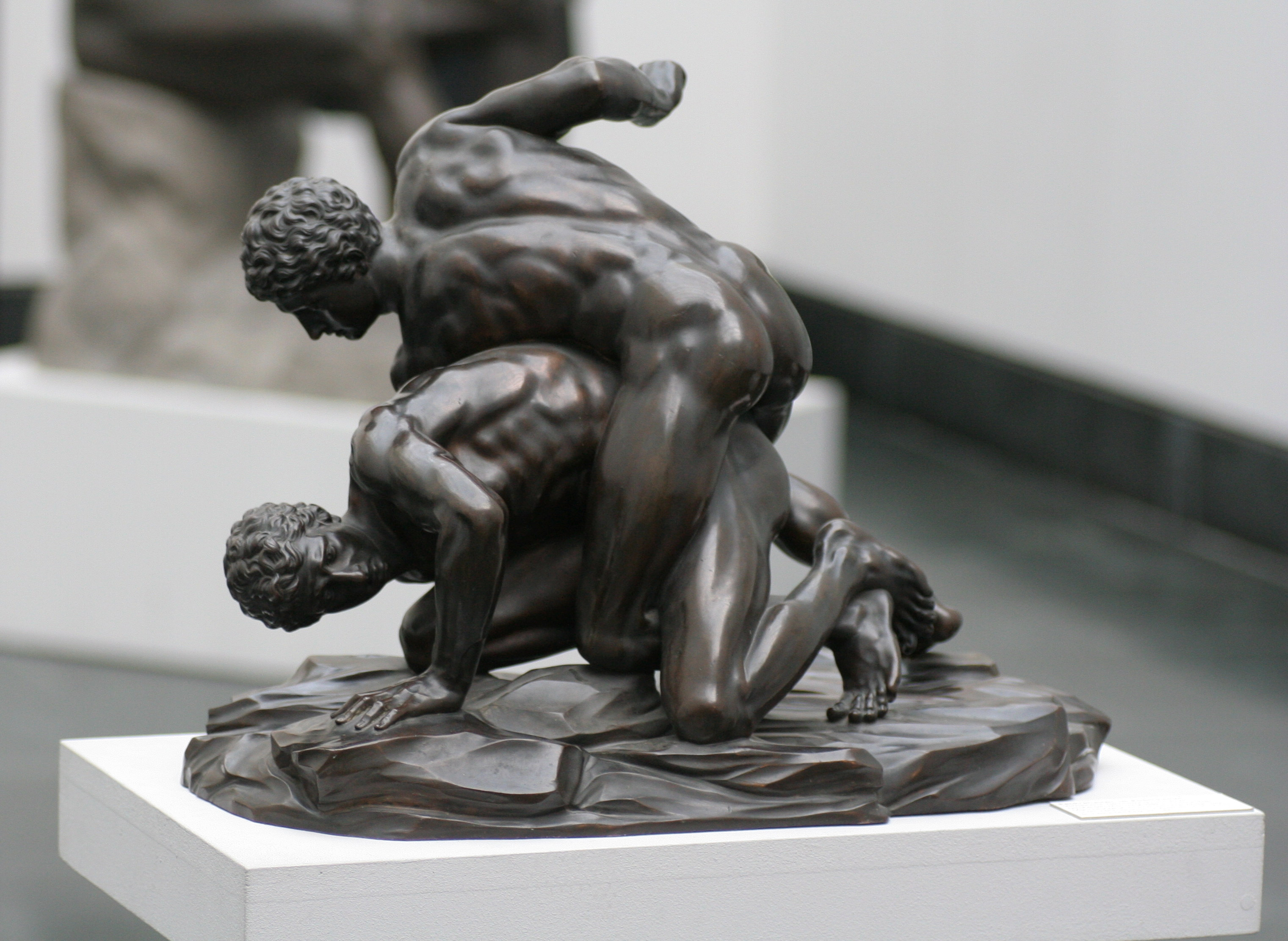
Ancient Greek wrestlers

Areas around the Mediterranean had a long tradition of athletic events. Ancient Egyptians and Mesopotamians depicted athletic scenes in the tombs of kings and their nobles. They did not, however, hold regular competitions, and those events that occurred were probably the preserve of kings and upper classes. Minoans culture held gymnastics in high esteem, with bull-leaping, tumbling, running, wrestling and boxing shown on their frescoes. The Mycenaeans adopted Minoan games and also raced chariots in religious or funerary ceremonies. Homer's heroes participate in athletic competitions to honor the dead. In the Iliad there are chariot races, boxing, wrestling, a foot race, as well as fencing, archery, and spear throwing. The Odyssey adds to these a long jump and discus throw.

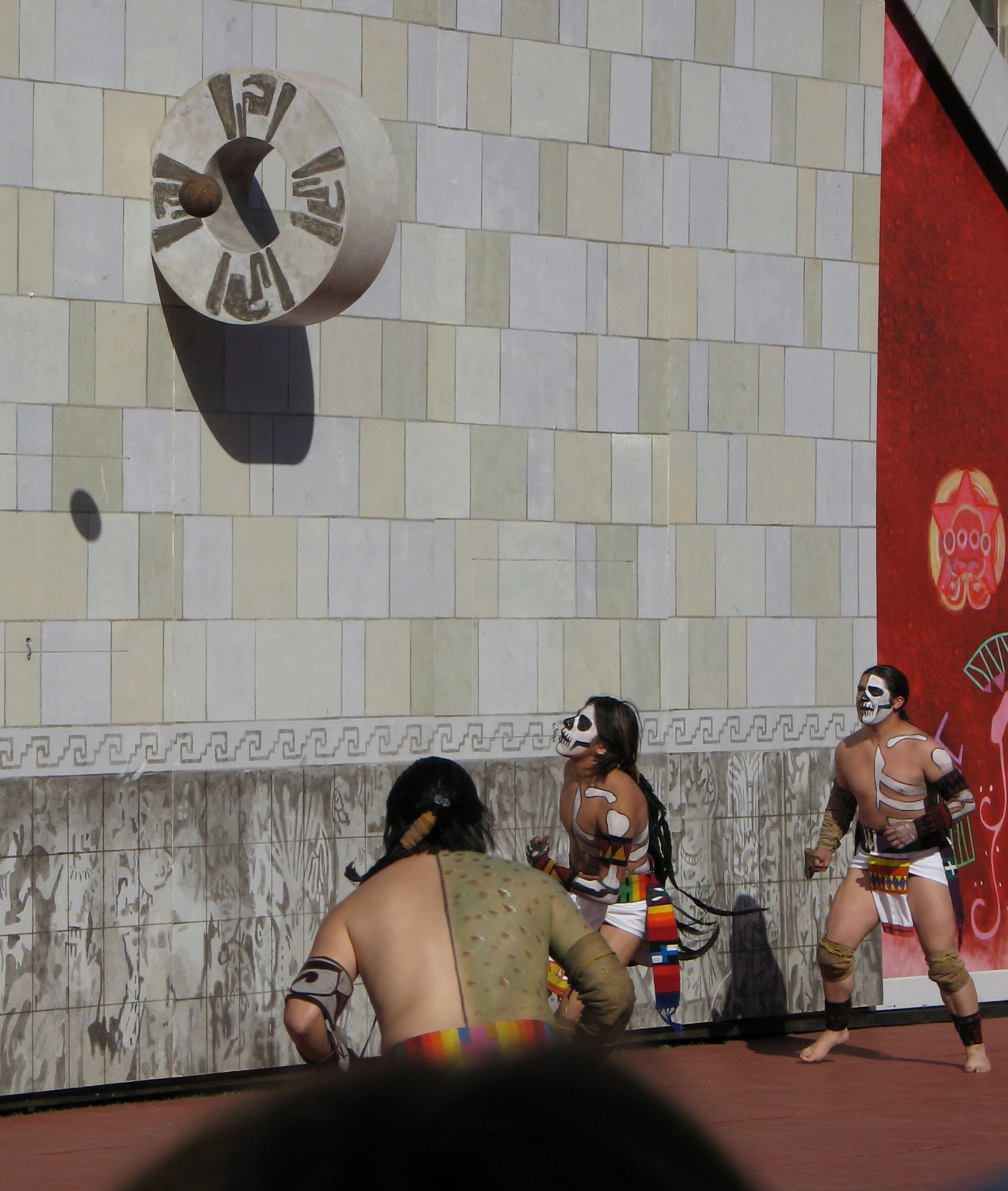
The ball in front of the goal during a game of pok-ta-pok, 2006

It was in Greece that sports were first instituted formally, with the first Olympic Games recorded in 776 BCE in Olympia, where they were celebrated until 393 CE. These ancient Olympic Games consisted of running, long jump, boxing, wrestling, Pankration (combat sport), discus throw, and javelin throw. In the Bayankhongor Province of Mongolia, Neolithic-era cave paintings dating to 7000 BC depict a wrestling match surrounded by crowds. Prehistoric cave-paintings in Japan show a sport similar to sumo wrestling. In Wadi Sura, near Gilf Kebir in Libya, a Neolithic rock painting in the cave of swimmers shows evidence of swimming and archery being practiced around 6000 BC.

Team sports have a rich and ancient history dating back thousands of years. These activities served as important facets of society, not only for physical fitness but also for social, cultural, and even political purposes. In ancient civilizations, team sports were prevalent and often intertwined with religious and cultural practices. In Mesoamerica, the Aztec ball game, ollamaliztli, was not just a sport but also a ritual with symbolic significance.

The Greeks, who laid the foundations for many contemporary sports, held various team sports as central to their culture. The Olympic Games, first recorded in 776 BCE, featured events like chariot racing and team foot races, fostering unity and friendly competition among city-states. The Spartans, known for their military prowess, engaged in team sports like the episkyros, a type of football.

Rome adopted and adapted many Greek sports, introducing harpastum, a ball game similar to soccer, and ludi circenses, which included team chariot racing. These sports provided a sense of entertainment and unity, while also serving as a means of social control.

In ancient China, cuju was a popular team sport akin to modern soccer, played as early as the Han dynasty (206 BCE – 220 CE). The sport was not only a form of entertainment but also a means of fostering camaraderie among communities.

Throughout history, team sports have reflected the values and priorities of their respective cultures. Whether it was the competitive spirit of the Greeks, the discipline of the Romans, or the communal bonding in China, ancient team sports played an integral role in the social fabric of civilizations. They transcended mere physical activity, serving as a testament to the enduring significance of sports in human history. Today, these ancient traditions continue to influence modern team sports, reminding us of the timeless appeal and cultural importance of collective athletic endeavors.

== Olympic team sports ==
Status after the 2024 Summer Olympics

=== Current Olympic team sports (16) ===
Summer Olympics (14)

Sport	Men		Women	
Sport	First edition	Editions	First edition	Editions
Cricket at the Summer Olympics	Paris 1900	1	Los Angeles 2028	not yet held
Football at the Summer Olympics	Paris 1900	27	Atlanta 1996	7
Water polo at the Summer Olympics	Paris 1900	28	Sydney 2000	6
Lacrosse at the Summer Olympics	St. Louis 1904	2	Los Angeles 2028	not yet held
Field hockey at the Summer Olympics	London 1908	24	Moscow 1980	11
Basketball at the Summer Olympics	Berlin 1936	20	Montreal 1976	12
Basketball (3x3) at the Summer Olympics	Tokyo 2020	1	Tokyo 2020	1
Handball at the Summer Olympics	Berlin 1936	14	Montreal 1976	12
Volleyball at the Summer Olympics	Tokyo 1964	15	Tokyo 1964	15
Beach volleyball at the Summer Olympics	Atlanta 1996	7	Atlanta 1996	7
Baseball at the Summer Olympics	Barcelona 1992	6	—	—
Softball at the Summer Olympics	—	—	Atlanta 1996	5
Rugby sevens at the Summer Olympics	Rio de Janeiro 2016	2	Rio de Janeiro 2016	2
Flag football at the Summer Olympics	Los Angeles 2028	not yet held	Los Angeles 2028	not yet held

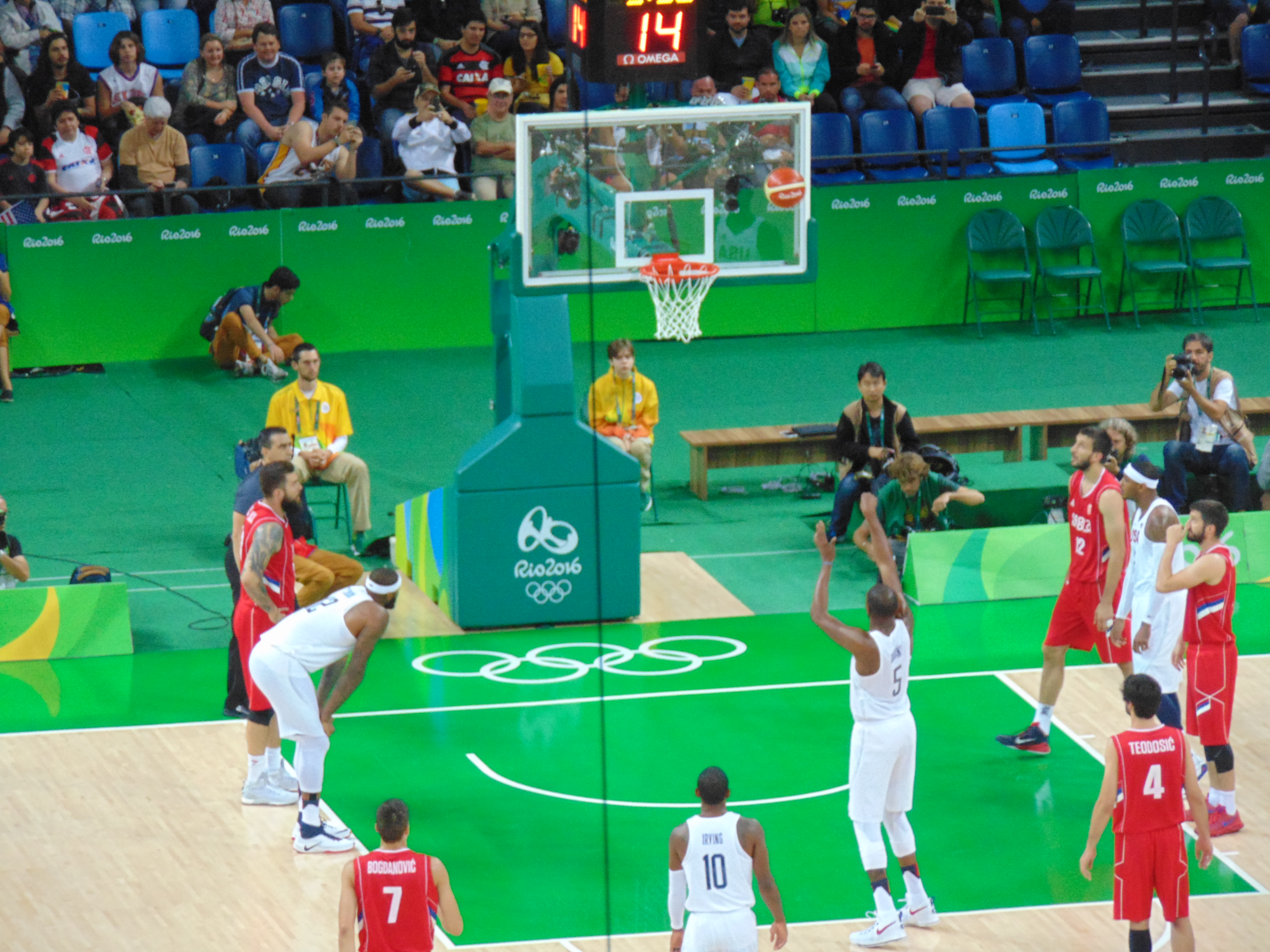
Basketball at the 2016 Summer Olympics

Notes

1. Olympic Games 2028: Baseball/softball, cricket (T20), flag football and lacrosse (sixes) have been officially included as additional team sports on the programme for the Olympic Games Los Angeles 2028 (LA28), but are not part of the previous 2024 Summer Olympics in Paris.

Winter Olympics (2): Ice hockey and curling are team sports at the Winter Olympics, with particularity that the men's tournament in Ice hockey was introduced at the 1920 Summer Olympics and was transferred permanently to the Winter Olympic Games program in 1924, in France. Before the monobob event has been introduced as an additional women's class by the IBSF for the 2020–21 world cup season and the 2022 Olympic games, bobsleigh was considered as a pure team sport, that can only be practiced as a team with at least two drivers. At the present time the men's events consist of the two-man and four-man class and the women's events are restricted only to the two-woman and women's monobob class.

Sport	Men		Women	
Sport	First edition	Editions	First edition	Editions
Ice hockey at the Winter Olympics	Antwerp 1920	25	Nagano 1998	7
Curling at the Winter Olympics	Chamonix 1924	8	Nagano 1998	7

=== Discontinued Olympic team sports (3) ===
- Polo at the Summer Olympics (at 5 editions: 1900 Paris, 1908 London, 1920 Antwerp, 1924 Paris, 1936 Berlin)
- Rugby Union at the Summer Olympics (at 4 editions: 1900 Paris, 1908 London, 1920 Antwerp, 1924 Paris)
- Tug of War at the Summer Olympics (at 5 editions: 1900 Paris to 1920 Antwerp)

=== Demonstration team sports at the Olympic Games (9) ===
- Gaelic football (at 1 edition as a demonstration sport: 1904 St. Louis)
- American football (at 2 editions as a demonstration sport: 1904 St. Louis and Los Angeles 1932)
- Hurling (at 1 edition as a demonstration sport: 1904 St. Louis)
- Cycle polo (at 1 edition as a demonstration sport: London 1908)
- Korfball (at 2 editions as a demonstration sport: 1920 Antwerp and Amsterdam 1928)
- Kaatsen (at 1 edition as a demonstration sport: Amsterdam 1928)
- Pesäpallo (at 1 edition as a demonstration sport: Helsinki 1952)
- Australian football (at 1 edition as a demonstration sport: Melbourne 1956)
- Roller hockey (at 1 edition as a demonstration sport: 1992 Barcelona)

== Participation ==
In the United States, the Sports & Fitness Industry Association estimated that 92.3 million people aged six or older played a team sport in 2025, an increase of 7.6 percent from the previous year. The estimate was based on 18,000 online interviews conducted during 2025 and weighted to represent the national population.

== Attendances ==
The table lists the top 10 team sports in which at least one club had an average home league attendance of 20,000 or more during the 2024–25 or 2025 season. The top 5 teams with the highest average home league attendance per sport are included.

American football	Average	Association football	Average	Australian football	Average	Baseball	Average	Basketball	Average
Michigan Wolverines	110,842	River Plate	85,018	Collingwood	67,104	Los Angeles Dodgers	49,536	North Carolina Tar Heels	20,521
Penn State Nittany Lions	107,093	Borussia Dortmund	81,365	Carlton	48,521	San Diego Padres	42,434	Kentucky Wildcats	20,334
Texas A&M Aggies	106,159	Bayern München	75,000	Fremantle FC	45,758	New York Yankees	42,408	Chicago Bulls	20,138
Ohio State Buckeyes	104,105	Manchester United	73,987	Adelaide FC	45,533	Hanshin Tigers	41,722	Dallas Mavericks	20,079
Texas Longhorns	102,367	Real Madrid	73,658	West Coast Eagles	42,576	Philadelphia Phillies	41,672	Tennessee Volunteers	20,026
Canadian football	Average	Cricket	Average	Ice hockey	Average	Rugby league	Average	Rugby union	Average
Winnipeg Blue Bombers	32,343	Kolkata Knight Riders	45,877	Club de hockey Canadien	21,105	Brisbane Broncos	41,185	Union Bordeaux Bègles	32,864
Saskatchewan Roughriders	28,427	Gujarat Titans	43,957	Detroit Red Wings	19,345	Canterbury-Bankstown Bulldogs	30,688	Leinster Rugby	26,930
BC Lions	27,124	Perth Scorchers	38,507	Chicago Blackhawks	19,130	Eastern Suburbs	25,846	Stormers	25,153
Hamilton Tiger-Cats	22,858	Chennai Super Kings	37,944	Tampa Bay Lightning	19,092	New Zealand Warriors	25,382	Harlequin	23,837
Calgary Stampeders	22,295	Lucknow Super Giants	34,821	Florida Panthers	19,059	Melbourne Storm	23,959	Stade toulousain	21,746

== See also ==
- List of sports
- Bread and circuses
- Olympic sports
- Individual sport
- Major professional sports teams in the United States and Canada
- Most valuable player
- Professional sports leagues in the United States
- Relay race
- Sports strategy
