= Gilf =

Gilf may refer to:

- Gilf Kebir, a plateau in the New Valley Governorate of the remote southwest corner of Egypt, and southeast Libya
- Gilf Kebir National Park A national park in the New Valley Governorate of the remote southwest corner of Egypt
- GILF!, pseudonym for American artist Ann Lewis
- GILF, an acronym for Grandmother/Grandma I'd Like To Fuck, see MILF § Similar terms
