= Magharet el Kantara =

Rock art cave shelter in the Gif Kebir National Park in Egypt

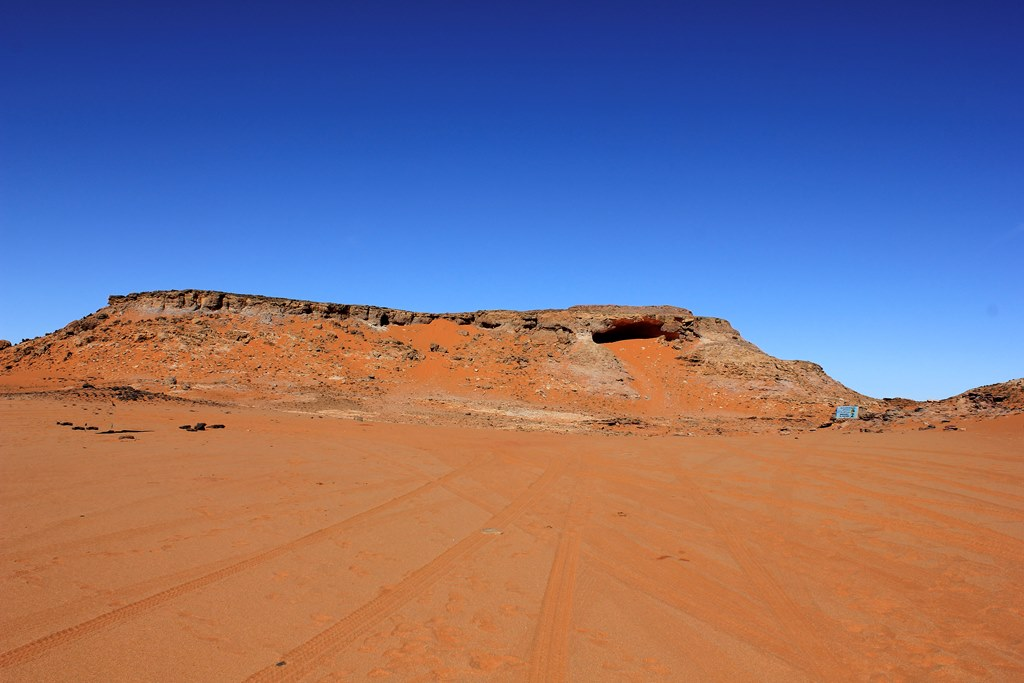
- The cave of Magharet el-Kantara

- Location in Egypt
- 22°58′56″N 25°59′11″E
- Type: Cave paintings
- Periods: Neolithic
- Location: New Valley, Egypt

History
- Built: c. 5000 BC

Site notes
- Discovered: 1935 by Bill Shaw and Rupert Newman

Magharet el Kantara or Shaw's Cave (Arabic: مغارة القنطرة, arched cave) is a rock art shelter of the Gilf Kebir National Park in the New Valley Governorate, Egypt. Located on the south-western slopes of Gilf Kebir, it was discovered in 1935 by explorers Bill Shaw and Rupert Newman.

== Description ==
The cave is 4 m (13 ft) high and 15 m (49 ft) wide. About half a meter above the ground there are rock paintings of a herd of differently drawn cattle and a farmstead representing a rare example of cattle paintings in the Gilf Kebir that otherwise are abundant in the nearby Jebel Ouenat. These Neolithic rock paintings testify the favorable climatic conditions of life during the African humid period much different from the present one.

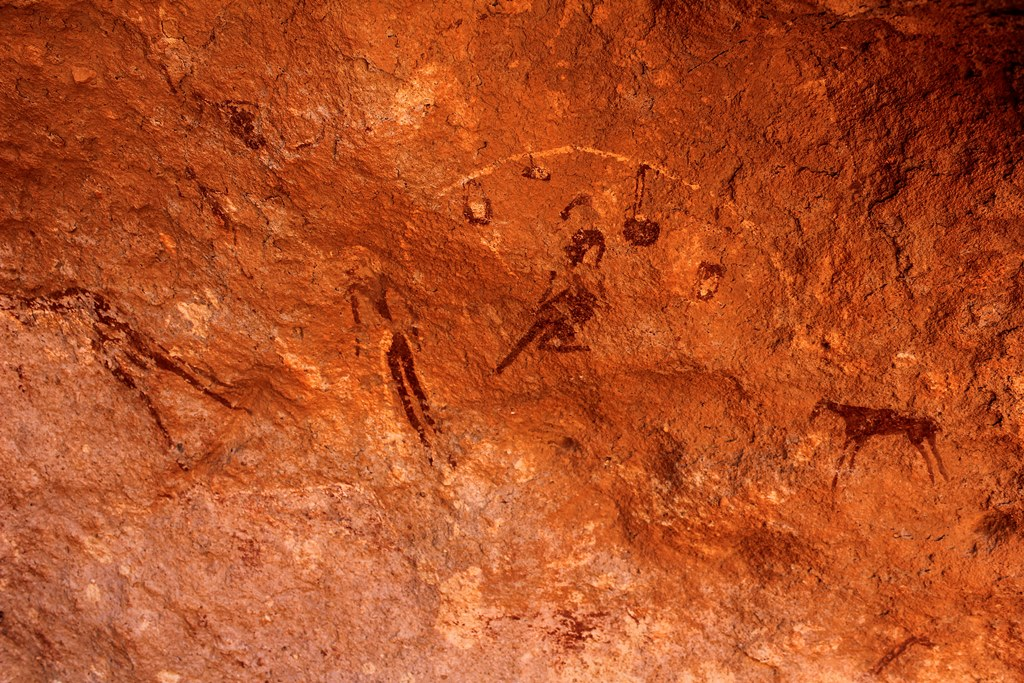
Rock painted farmstead

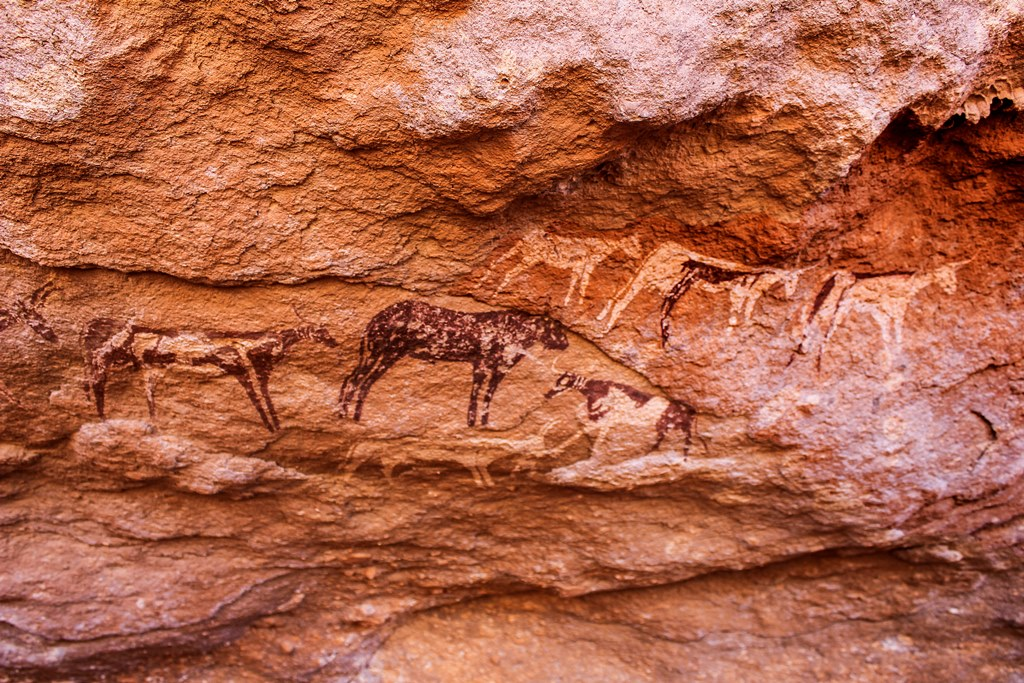
Rock painted cattle

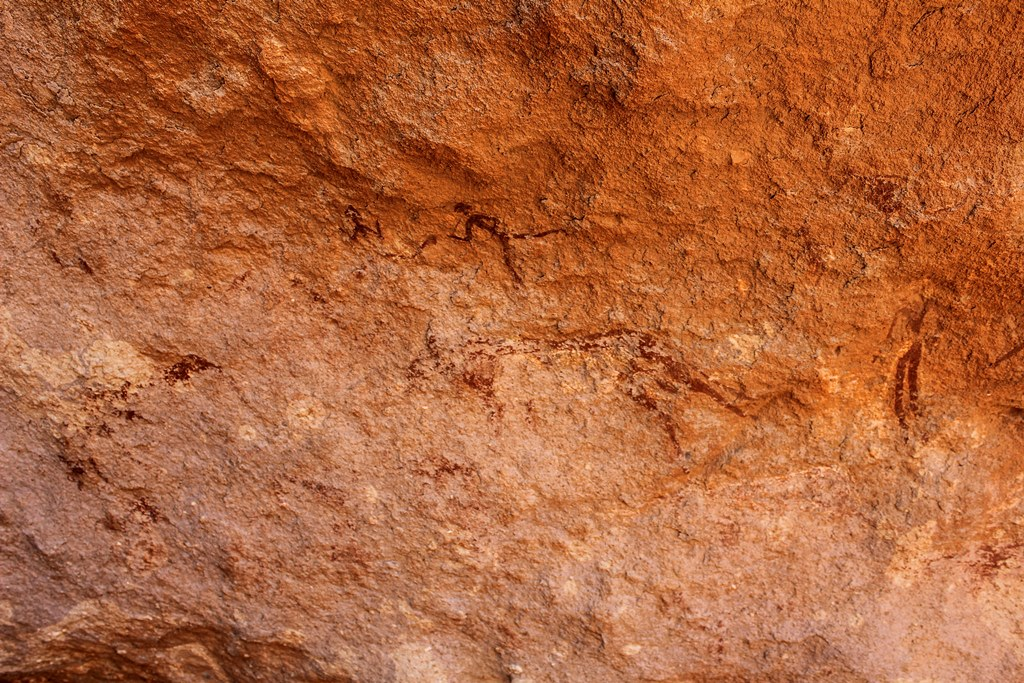
Rock painted shepherds with cattle
