= Wadi Hamra (Gilf Kebir) =

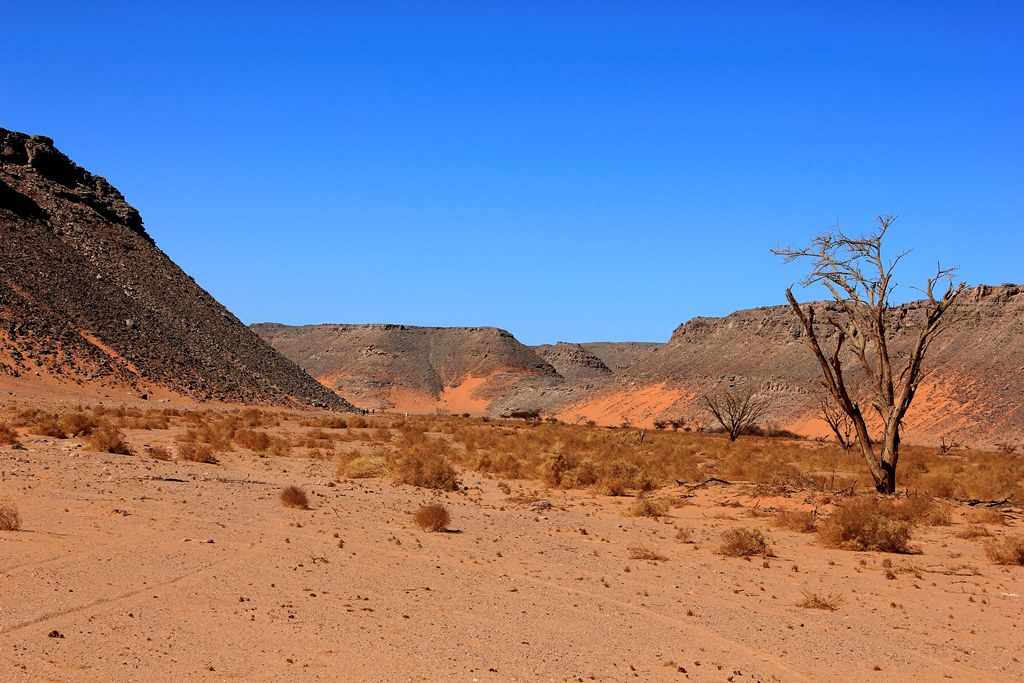
- Upper section of wadi Hamra

- Location within Egypt
- Length: 20 km (12 mi) south-north

Geography
- Location: Gilf Kebir, Egypt
- Coordinates: 23°51′8″N 25°27′4″E
- Interactive map of Wadi Hamra

Wadi Hamra (Arabic: الوادي الحمراء, red valley) is a valley of Gilf Kebir, in New Valley Governorate in the extreme south-west of Egypt. It is known for its vegetation and rock encarvings.

== Geography ==
The approximately 20 km long wadi Ḥamra is the easternmost of three valleys originating from the Abu Ras Plateau in Gilf Kebir running north, consisting of wadi Ṭalḥ in the west and wadi Abd el-Mālik in the middle. The name of the wadi derives from the color of the sand, which appears reddish due to its high iron oxide content.

== Vegetation ==
The upper section of wadi Hamra receives run-off from the plateau and provides groundwater storage capacity for a remarkable growth of trees and shrubs despite its hyper-arid climate. The vegetation includes Acacia raddiana, shrubs like Maerua crassifolia, fagonias and Zilla spinosa.

== Rock engravings ==
In wadi Hamra there are three remarkable sites with rock engravings and petroglyphs depicting wild fauna such as giraffes, gazelles and antelopes:

- Rhotert's site in the upper reaches of the wadi, discovered during the Frobenius-Rhotert expedition in 1935.
- Negro's site, discovered by Negro & party in 1991, lies on a low rock face on the east side of the valley in the middle section.
- Berger's site, discovered by Berger & party in 1998, is at the end of a small side wadi not far from Negro's site.

== Gallery of rock engravings at Negro’s site ==
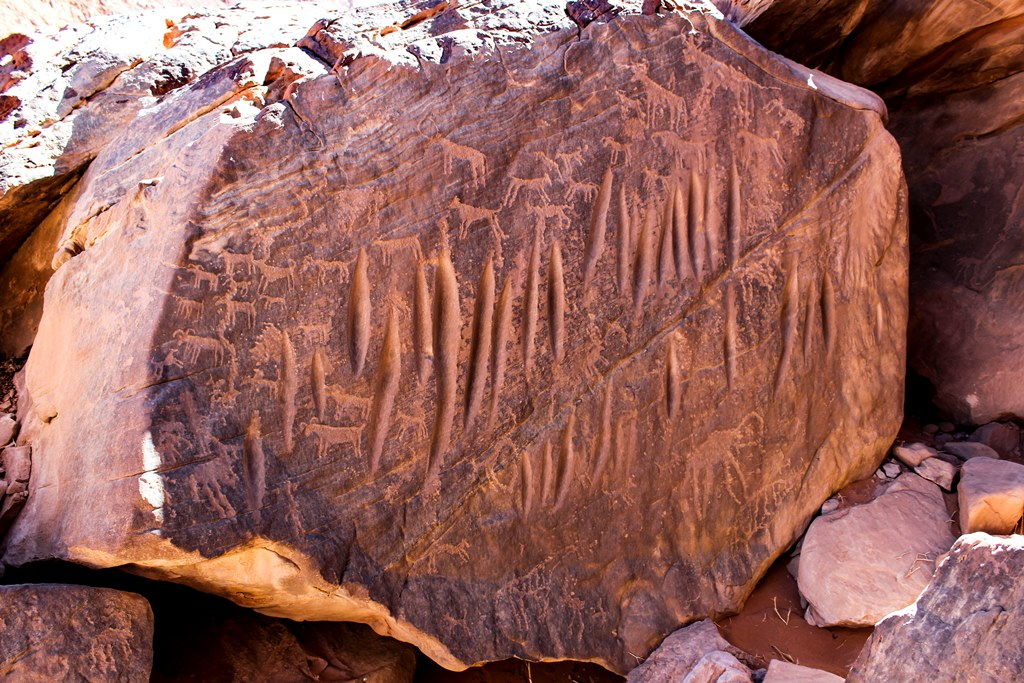
Boulder with engraved animals

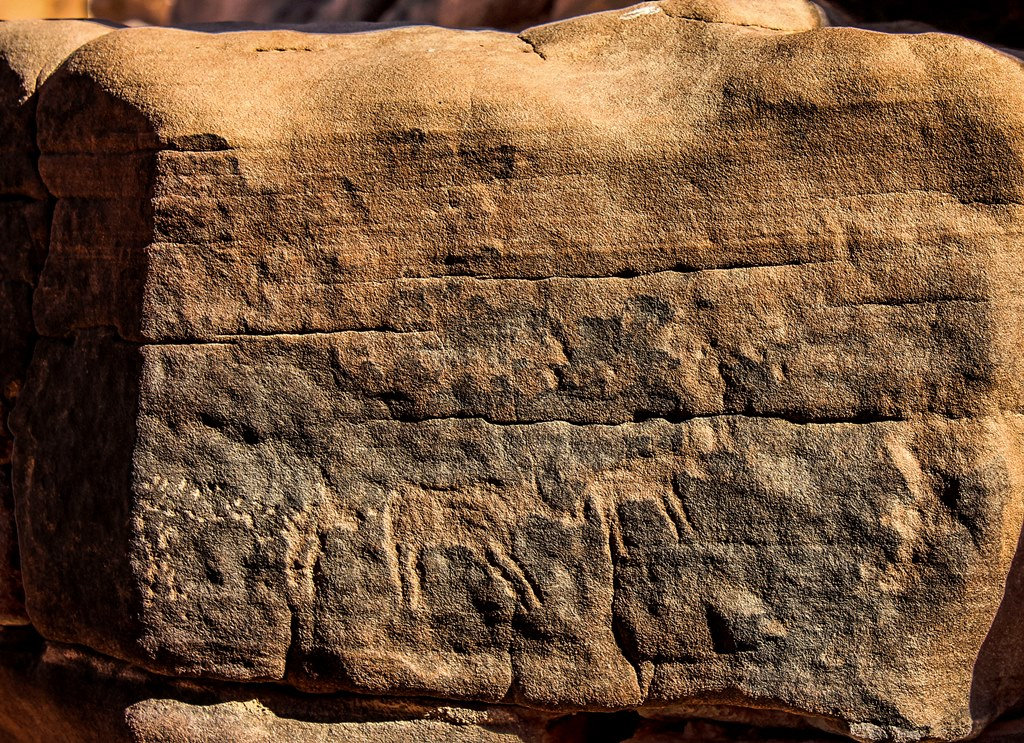
Boulder with pecked animals

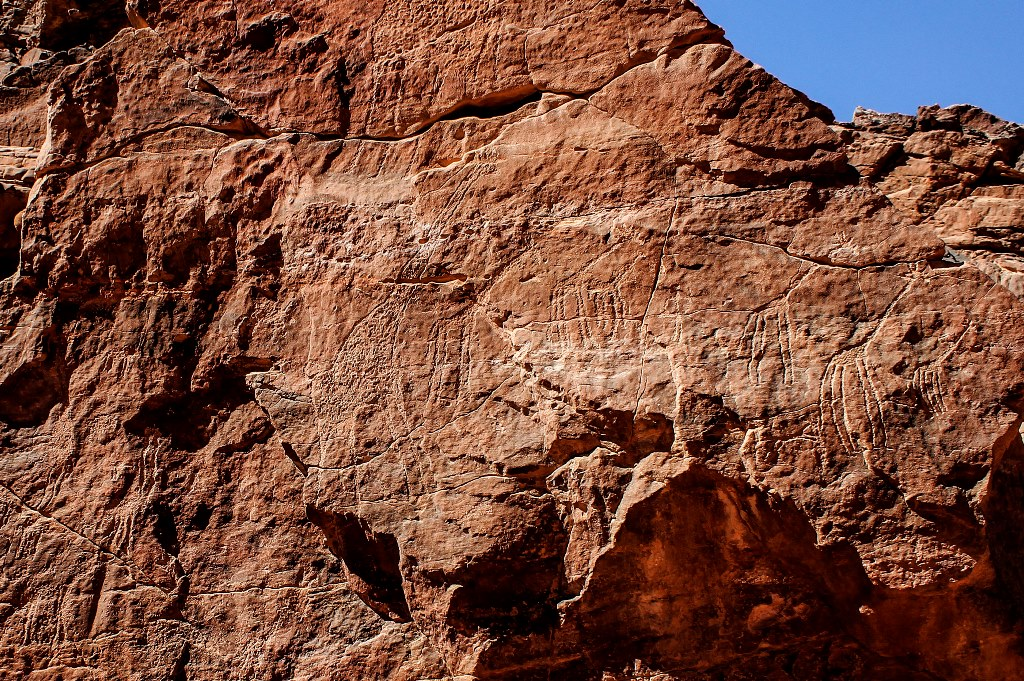
Pecked giraffes
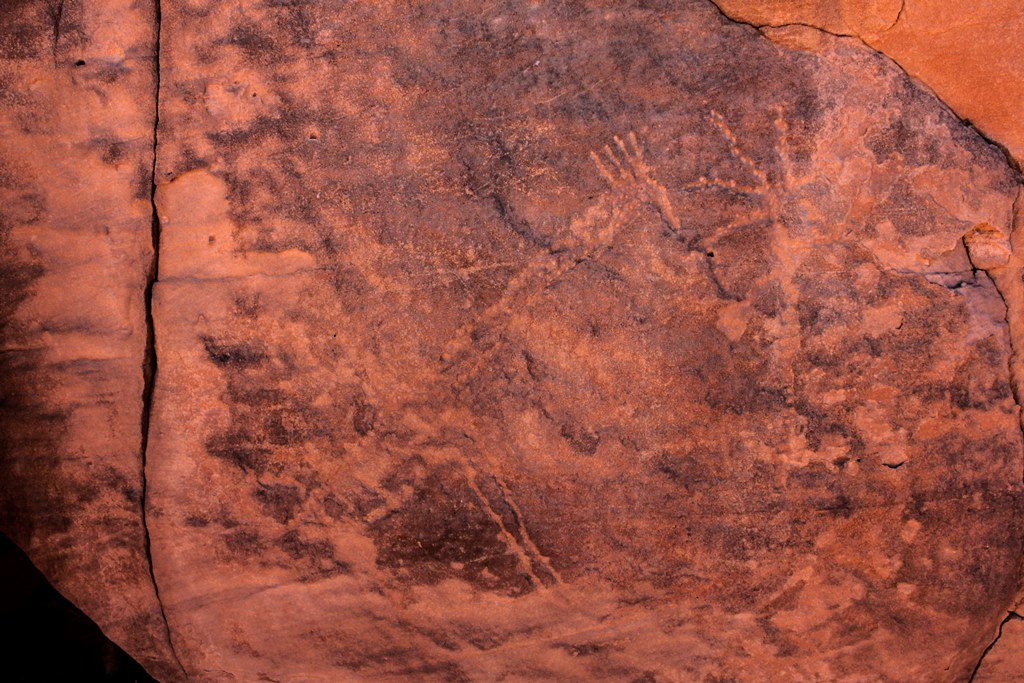
Giraffe

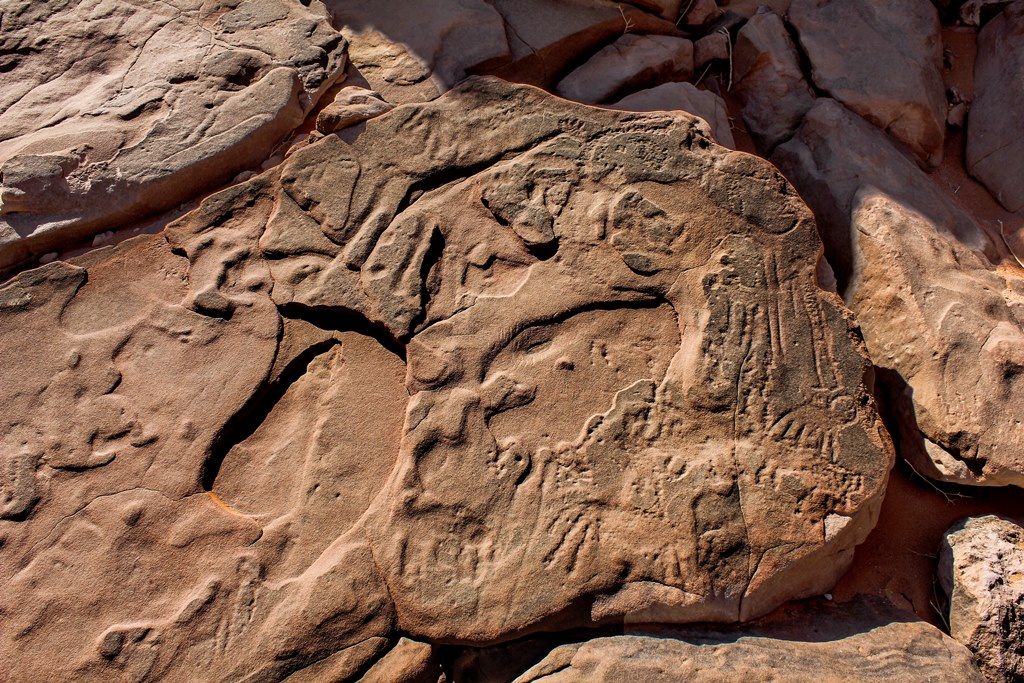
Pedroglyphs

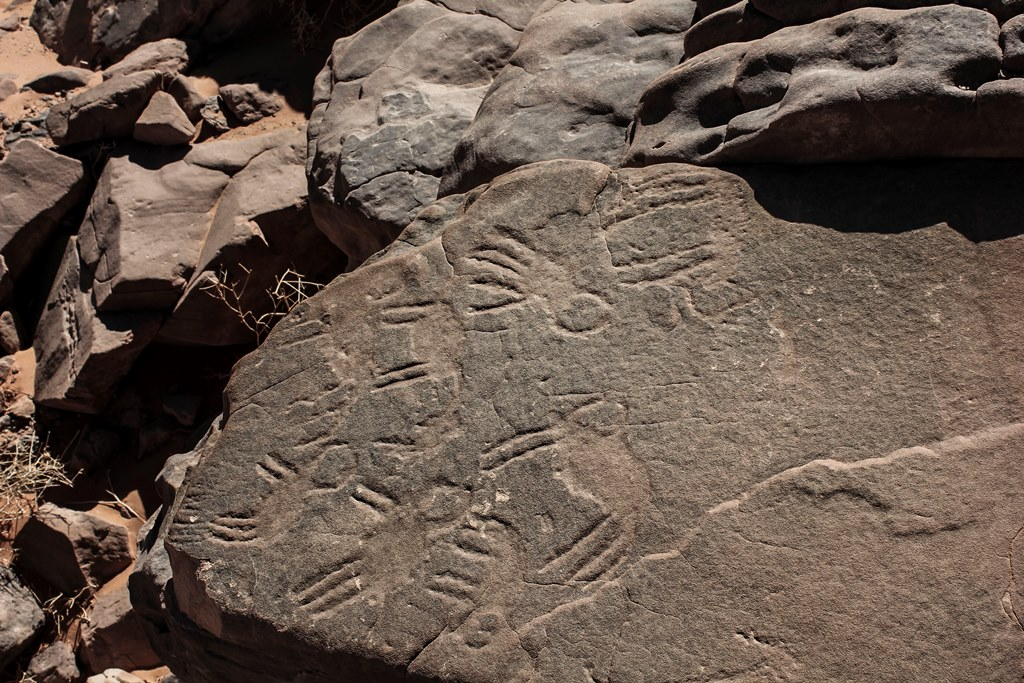
Pedroglyphs
