= Desert Research Center (Egypt) =

Egyptian scientific research center

Coordinates: 30.121688°N 31.315081°E

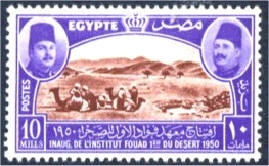
Fouad I Desert Institute establishment stamp 1950

The Desert Research Center is almost the oldest scientific research center in Egypt. It was officially opened on December 30, 1950, under the name of the institute of Foad I for desert research (IFDR) and after the revolution in 1952 it became under the name of Desert Research Institute (DRI). Then, the presidential Decree No. 90 of 1990 was issued to establish the Desert Research Center and it has an independent status belonging to the minister of Land Reclamation.

== Mission statement ==
Conducting research to explore the natural resources in the Egyptian deserts to be utilized at sustainable manner in Agriculture and improving livelihood of local communities' . The broad mandate is encompassing fields of research such as water resources, soil management, plant production, animal husbandry, ecology, and socioeconomic studies. Monitoring and assessing desertification causes. Field of operations is also broad-based, stretching from the Sinai to the New Valley to the fringes of the High Dam Lake.

== Major objectives ==
- Investigating desert potential for agriculture development.
- Carrying out studies on behalf of the government institutions, societies & small landholders.
- Preparing postgraduate research assistants & scholars for higher degree in the field of scientific research.
- Providing proper help and advice to target groups, whether local Bedouins or investors, to best utilize the available natural resources.
- Managing desert & newly reclaimed lands for agriculture use and developments.
- Studying means to ameliorate and combat drought, desertification and sand dunes movements.
- Monitoring & assessing desertification causes. Field operations are also broad-based, stretching from Sinai to the New Valley to the fringes of the high dam lakes.
- Excavation and developing desert natural resources including water, soil, plant & non-conventional energies.
- Monitoring land resources (Water & soils) in the desert & newly reclaimed areas.
- Surveying and evaluating surface & ground water in coastal and inland regions.
- Introducing non-conventional crops to be cultivated under drought and salinity stresses.
- Increasing productivity of livestock and poultry under desert conditions.
- Monitoring and combating desertification phenomenon, including sand encroachment control.
- Concluding socio-economic studies in desert regions.
- Cooperating with scientific local & international societies to organize workshops & symposiums dealing with the development aspects of the desert.
- Publishing and exchanging relevant scientific researches with different local, regional and international scientific institutions.
- Providing extension and training programs for personnel and investors involved in desert development activities.

== Structure ==
The Centers' community consists of 55 Research Professors, 59 Assistant research professors, 56 Researchers, 75 Research assistant, 32 Assistant researchers, and 1000 Administrators, technicians and laborers (at the DRC headquarters and stations). The center consists of a number of administrative offices, in addition to the 8 Stations, and 5 Associated Units (Tissue Culture Lab, Geographical Information Systems (GIS), Satellite Receiving Station, Private Service Unit (PSU), and Library). The center constitute of 32 Laboratories and 4 Major Divisions, 14 Departments.

- Water Resources and Desert Soils Division
1. Exploring & evaluating groundwater resources; their aquifers depth, thickness and extension and locating the optimum sites for water well drilling.
2. Drilling and testing of production and test wells.
3. Surveying, Classifying, mapping and evaluating desert soils using aerial photos, satellite photos and geographical information system (GIS)
