= Cave of Beasts =

Cave and archaeological site in Egypt

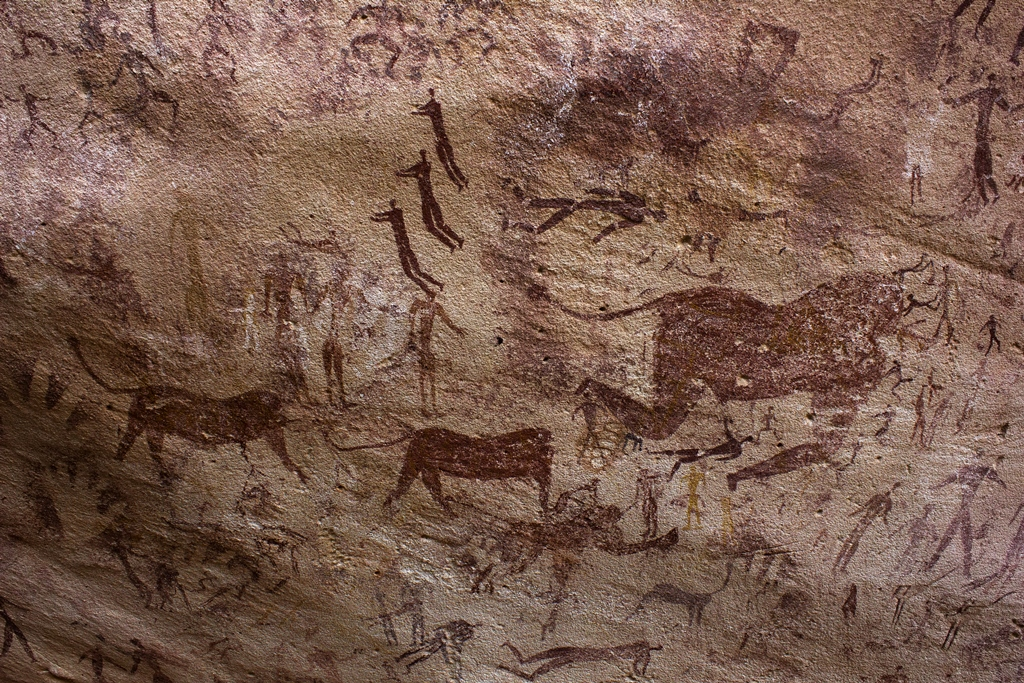
- Cave of Beasts – cut out

- Location within Egypt
- Location: Wadi Sura, Egypt
- Coordinates: 23°39′12″N 25°09′35″E

The Cave of the Beasts (also named Foggini-Mestikawi Cave or Foggini Cave or Cave Wadi Sura II) is a huge natural rock shelter in the Western Desert of Egypt featuring Neolithic rock paintings, more than 7,000 years old, with about 5,000 figures.

== Geographical location ==
The shelter is located in the Wadi Sura at the south-western foot of the Gilf Kebir Mountains in the remote south-western corner of Egypt's New Valley Governorate near the border of Libya and Sudan. The area, abandoned in the present day, is one of the most arid locations of the Sahara.

== Discovery ==
The shelter was discovered in 2002 by archaeologists Massimo and Jacopo Foggini and Ahmed Mestikawi. In 2010, scientists of the University of Cologne carried out an in-depth study of the shelter, calling it Wadi Sura II to distinguish it from the Cave of Swimmers (Wadi Sura I) located some 10 km (6.2 mi) further east.

== Age and paleo-climatology ==
The rock paintings were created more than 7,000 years ago at the beginning of the Chalcolithic age. At that time the Sahara's climate was humid. In the Holocene period there was a lake at the foot of the shelter. At the end of the Holocene climatic optimum 6,000 years ago, the climate pattern changed to arid and the area was depopulated.

== Description ==
The shelter is 17 m (56 ft) wide and almost 7 m (23 ft) high and contains over 5,000 well-preserved figures painted with red, yellow, white and black pigments. Hundreds of hand and foot stencil are over-painted with groups of human creatures and therianthropic and acephalic (headless) mythological creatures. Whereas the symbolism of the hand stencils can be found in many cave paintings all over the world, the beasts are unique. The shelter is upwardly topped off by rock engravings.

In February 2016 a report in the Journal of Archaeological Science concluded that the 13 small stencil hands (out of about 900 hand stencils) that had been considered to be human hand stencils "differ significantly in size, proportions and morphology from human hands" and were more likely made by humans using the hand of a monitor lizard as a stencil.

Many of the beasts were intentionally disfigured in prehistoric times. Always surrounded by human creatures, the beasts catch the eye due to their body size and shape: Long tailed, bull-like body, frequently three footed with human-like legs. Even headless they appear either to spit or to swallow human creatures.

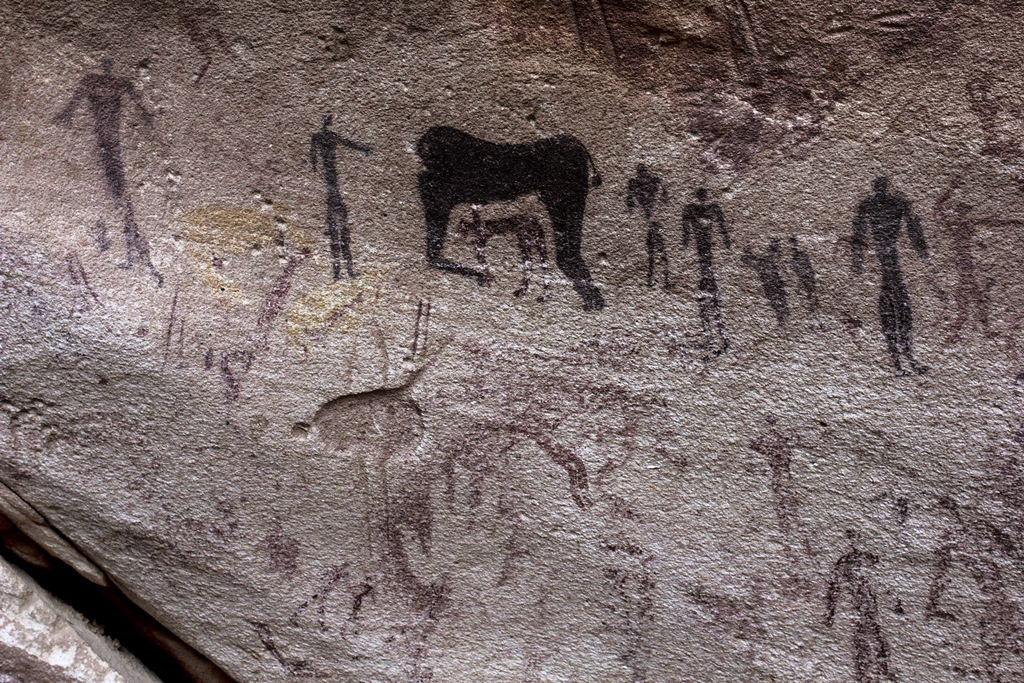
Detailed view of a beast

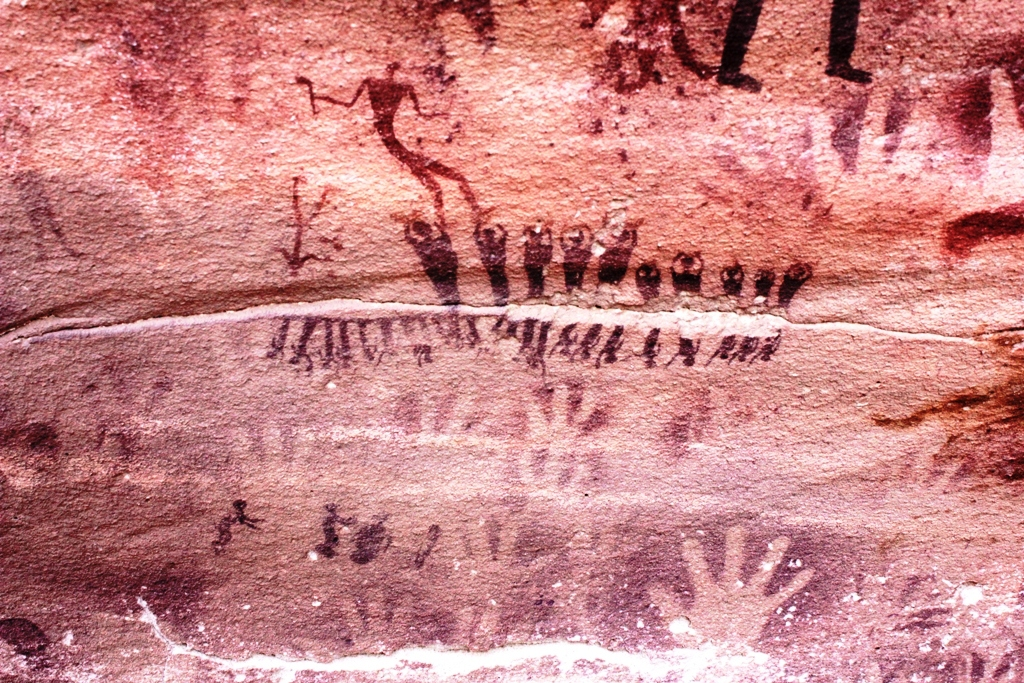
Hand stencils over-painted with groups human beings

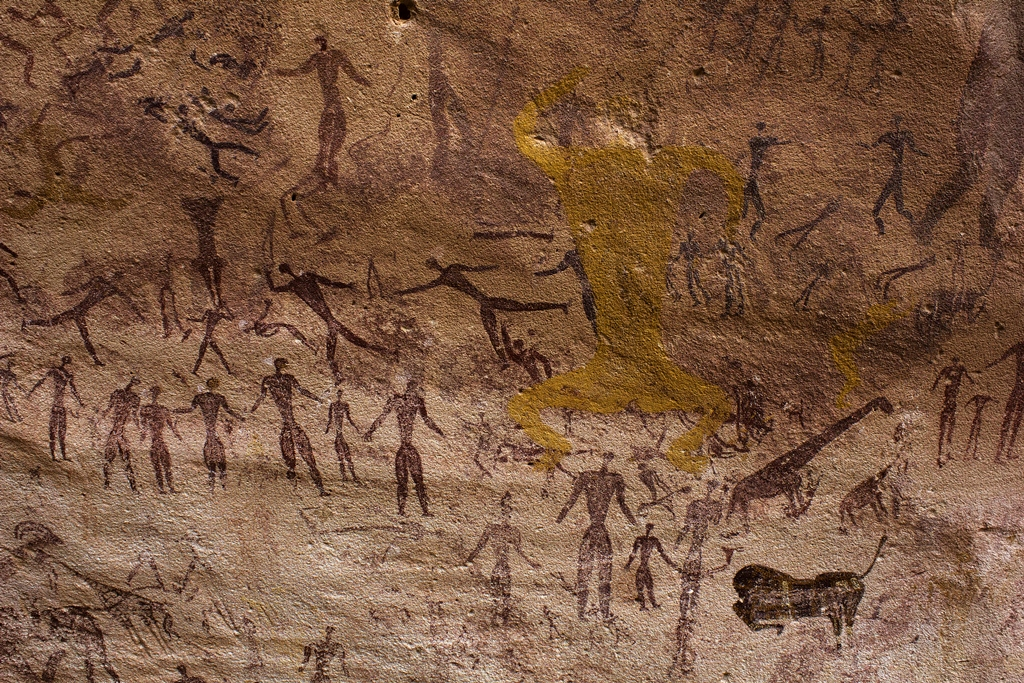
Dancing human beings over-painted with yellow pigmented creatures

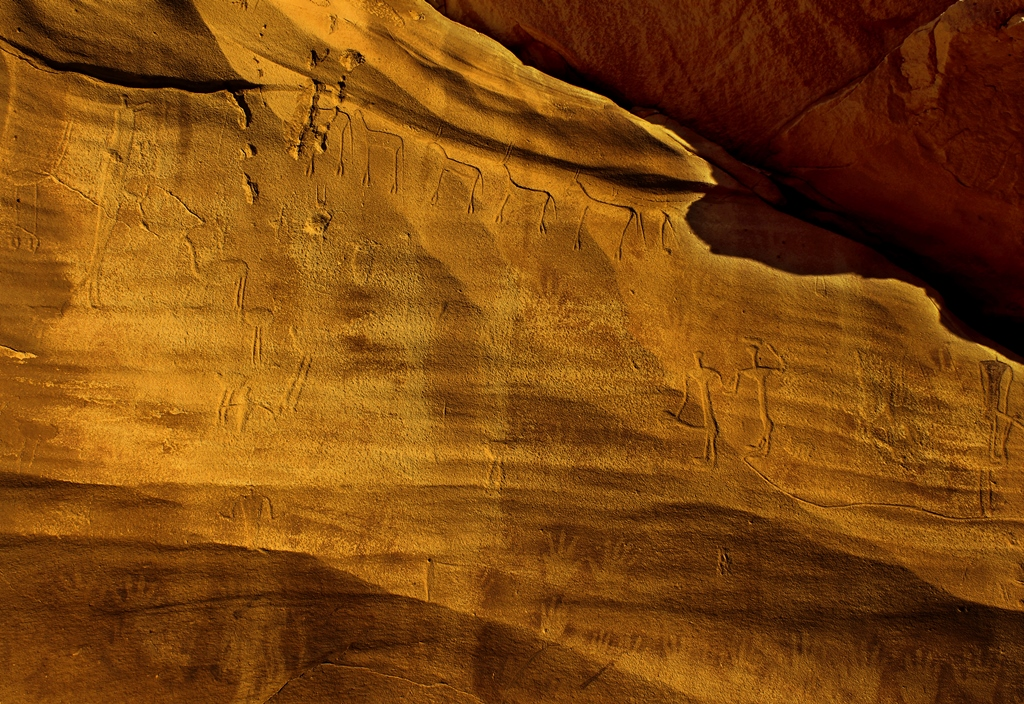
Rock engravings of gazelles on top of the shelter

Some of the beasts seem to be wrapped in a kind of golden net.

Furthermore, the shelter is covered with groups of dancing, floating or swimming human creatures. On the lower left edge of the shelter appear two groups of human creatures separated from each other by a rock crack. The ones above the rock crack are holding a sling over his head, while the ones below the crack have a hand above their heads and are all looking all to the left.

Scattered throughout the shelter appear wild animals: an elephant, ostriches, gazelles, and giraffes. Along with the beasts the figures of the shelter represent a mythological world whose symbolism is not understood.
