= Eight Bells Hills =

Topographic outlier of the Gilf Kebir plateau, Egypt

- Thamaniyat Ajras
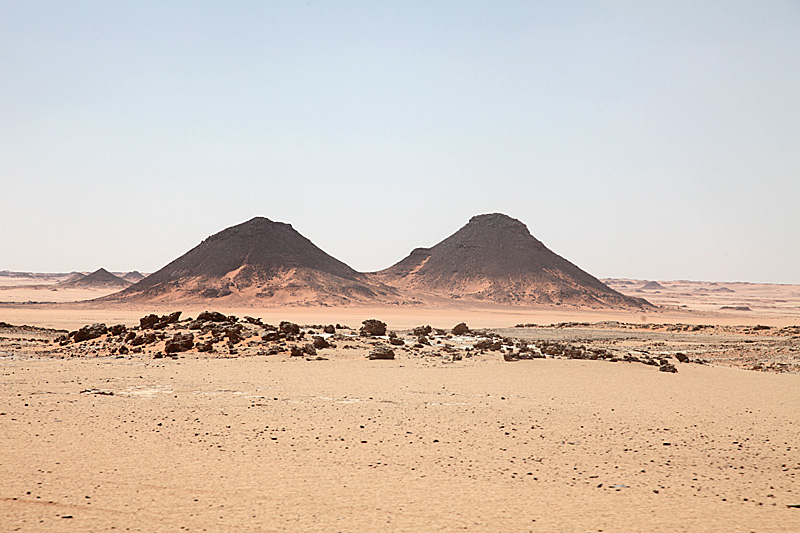
- Two of the eight rocks of Eight Bells Hills

Highest point
- Elevation: 753 to 755 m (2,470 to 2,477 ft)
- Coordinates: 22°48′33″N 26°14′14″E

Geography
- Location within Egypt
- Location: Egypt

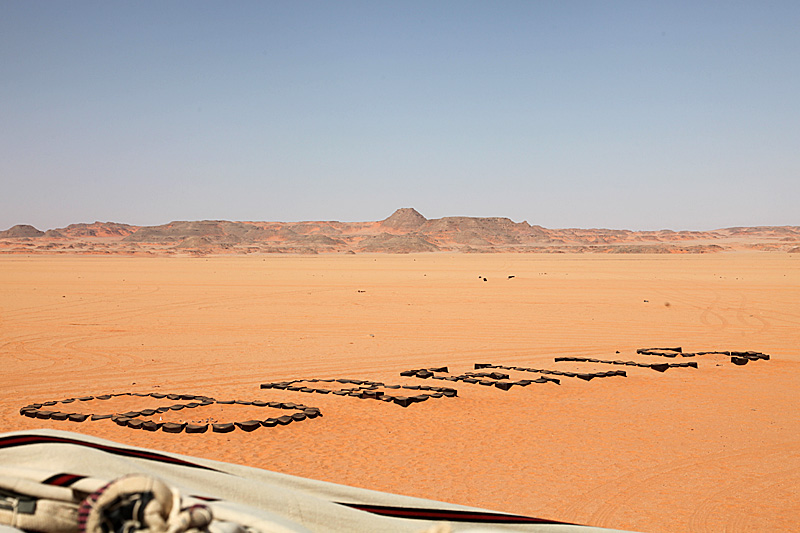
The aerodrome of Eight Bells Hills

Eight Bells Hills or Thamaniyat Ajras (Arabic: ثمانية أجراس) is a topographic outlier of the Gilf Kebir plateau in the extreme southwestern corner of Egypt. The site, a NW–SE striking line of eight flared hills of Palaeozoic sandstone, is located in the New Valley Governorate at an elevation of 731 m.

An airfield used during World War II by the RAF is located near the hills with the runway markings still visible. It is marked by empty tins, many with their paper labels still intact. The need for a landing area in this remote part of Egypt was due to the importance of the Libyan oasis of Kufra. Intermediate landing grounds were required to store petrol and two of these, Eight Bells (located 22°46′59″N 26°16′12″E) and Bir Terfawi, 200 km to the east, were established by the Long Range Desert Group.

By the 2000s, Eight Bells Hills and the surrounding region became popular for tourists due to the scenic views it offered. However, this led to an increase in incidents involving armed bandits, especially groups who were camping near the former airstrip. Initially, both parties would leave each other alone. Incidents occurred in 2003 and January 2007, which were kept quiet by Egyptian authorities. During the January 2007 incident, a tour group of 1 German and 3 Britons were stopped by a Land Cruiser carrying 8 gunmen. The gunmen seized a satellite phone, mobile phones, cash, and looted vehicles belonging to the tourists. After they left, leaving two cars, the group made it to Dakhla Oasis. Another incident occurred in August 2008, when a tour group near Eight Bells were almost stopped by bandits. According to group, they saw a Land Cruiser with around 15 gunmen approaching, and they hurriedly left the area. After stopping, they saw the bandits still following using binoculars, fleeing once again. Notably, in September 2008, a European tour group were kidnapped by Sudanese bandits, including their guides and drivers. The gunmen seized 11 Italians, Germans and Romanians and 8 Egyptian guides and drivers, bringing them into Sudan. On 25 September 2008, the group later moved to Libya according to the Sudanese government, but Libyan authorities reported that there were no sightings. The German government attempted negotiations from where a ransom of millions of dollars was demanded.

A meteorite was found In the area of Eight Bells in 2016.
