= Baris, Egypt =

Baris باريس
- Town
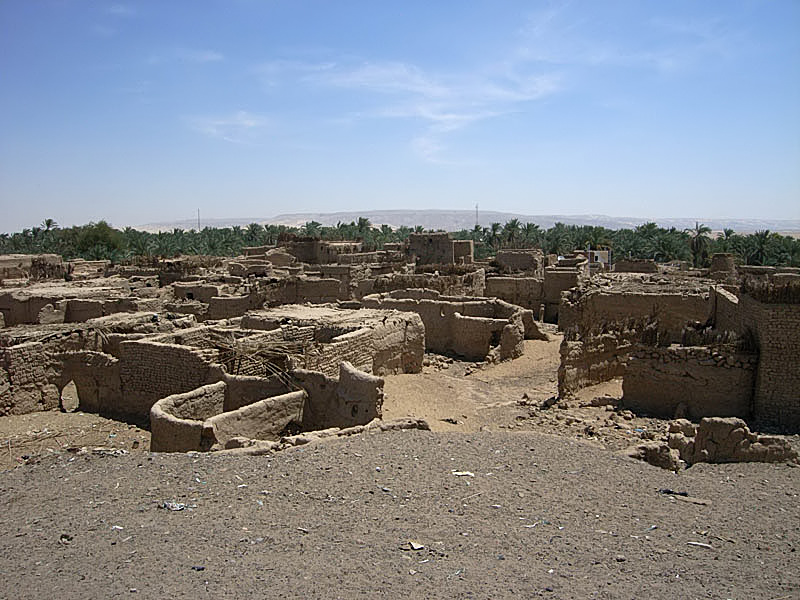

- Location in Egypt
- Coordinates: 24.653258°N 30.595322°E
- Country: Egypt
- Governorate: New Valley
- Time zone: UTC+2 (EET)
  - Summer (DST): UTC+3 (EEST)

Baris (Arabic: باريس) is a town in Egypt's Western Desert. It contains the ancient Egyptian temple of Dosh. It is south of the New Valley Governorate, 90 km (56 mi) from the Kharga Oasis.

The name of the town comes from Coptic: ⲡⲁⲣⲏⲥ, lit. 'the one of the south'.
