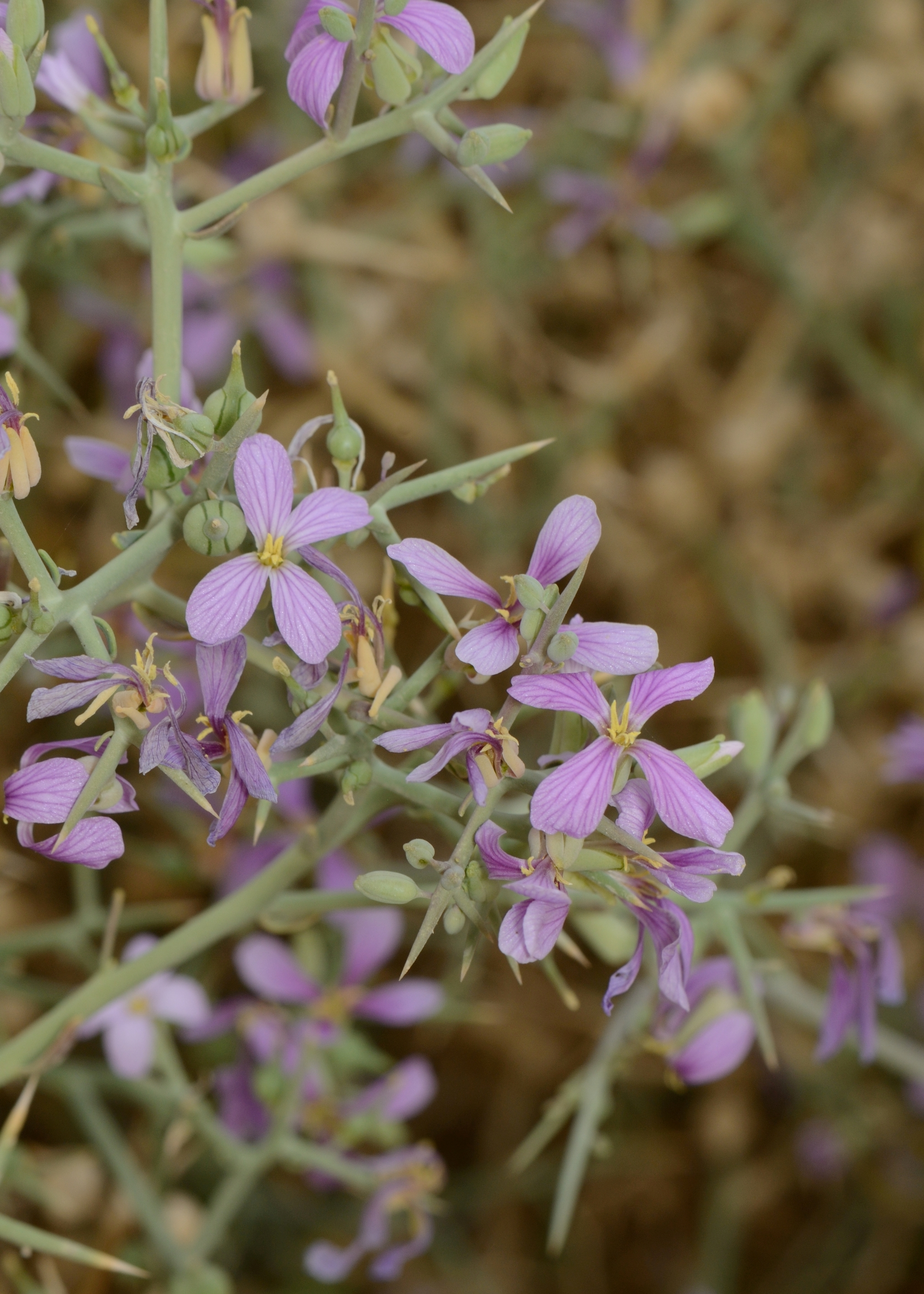

Scientific classification
- Kingdom: Plantae
- Clade: Tracheophytes
- Clade: Angiosperms
- Clade: Eudicots
- Clade: Rosids
- Order: Brassicales
- Family: Brassicaceae
- Genus: Zilla; Forssk.
- Species: Z. spinosa

Binomial name
- Zilla spinosa (L.) Prantl

Synonyms
- Bunias spinosa L. (1767) (basionym); Myagrum spinosum (L.) Lam.; Zilla myagroides var. macrocarpa DC.

= Zilla spinosa =

Genus of flowering plants

Zilla is a genus of plants in the family Brassicaceae. It includes a single species, Zilla spinosa, that grows in the Sahara-Arabian deserts of northern Africa and the Arabian Peninsula.

== Description ==
Their flowers are light violet.

== Subspecies ==
Four subspecies are accepted.

- Zilla spinosa subsp. biparmata (O.E.Schulz) Maire & Weiller
- Zilla spinosa subsp. costata Maire & Weiller
- Zilla spinosa subsp. macroptera (Coss.) Maire & Weiller
- Zilla spinosa subsp. spinosa

== Formerly placed here ==
- Physorhynchus chamaerapistrum (as Zilla chamaerapistrum Boiss. and Zilla schouwioides Boiss.)
