= Cave of Swimmers =

Cave with ancient rock art in southwest Egypt

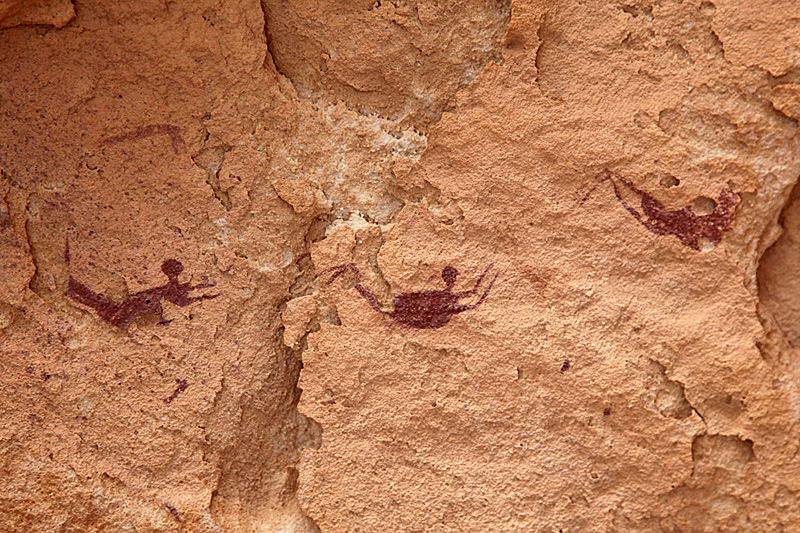
- Rock art of swimmers

- Location in Egypt
- 23°35′40.99″N 25°14′0.60″E
- Type: Cave paintings
- Periods: Neolithic
- Location: New Valley, Egypt

History
- Built: c. 8000 BC

Site notes
- Discovered: October 1933 by Laszlo Almasy

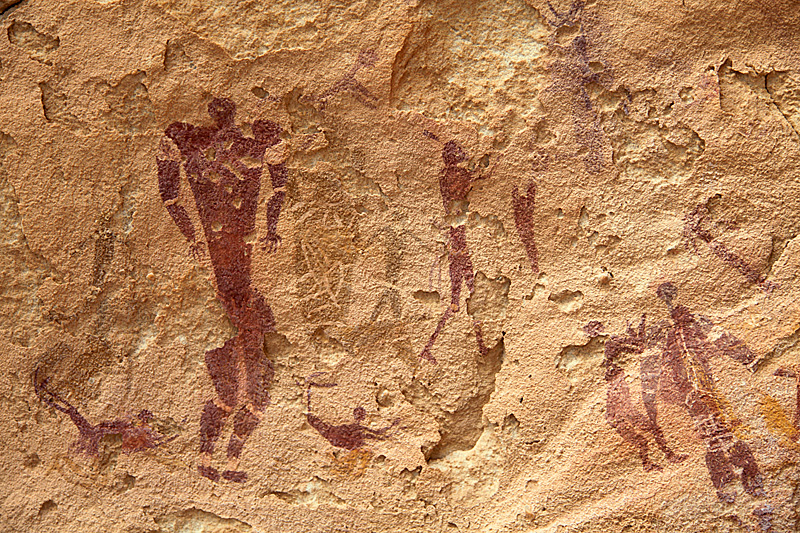
depiction of humans

The Cave of Swimmers is a rock shelter with ancient rock art in the mountainous Gilf Kebir plateau of the Libyan Desert section of the Sahara Desert. It is located in the New Valley Governorate of southwest Egypt, near the border with Libya.

== Modern discovery ==
The rock shelter and rock art were discovered in October 1933 by the Hungarian explorer László Almásy. It contains Neolithic pictographs (rock painting images) and is named due to the depictions of people with their limbs bent as if they were swimming. The drawings include those of a giraffe and a hippopotamus. They are estimated to have been created as early as 8000 BC with the beginning of the African Humid Period, when the Sahara was significantly greener and wetter than it is today. The climate change 5000 years ago was due to changes in summer solar insolation and vegetation and dust feedbacks.

Almásy devoted a chapter to the rock shelter in his 1934 book, The Unknown Sahara. In it he postulates that the swimming scenes are real depictions of life at the time of painting and that the artists had realistically drawn their surroundings and that there had been a climatic change from temperate to xeric desert since that time making it drier. This theory was so new at that time that his first editor added several footnotes, to make it clear that he did not share this opinion. In 2007, Eman Ghoneim discovered an ancient mega-lake (30,750 km²) buried beneath the sand of the Sahara Desert in the Northern Darfur region, Sudan.

== Later history ==
Physical scientists who have been conducting research in the area drew a provisional link between the proposed swimming humans and two lakes that are 124 miles (or 200 km) south of the rock shelter. However, modern researchers such as Andras Zboray question whether the figures are swimming or not. He believes that the drawings are "clearly symbolic...with an unknown meaning".

Other researchers such as German ethnologist Hans Rhotert, who was involved in rock art research in North Africa and the Middle East, was the first to interpret these drawings as being that of deceased people. Jean-Loïc Le Quellec, a doctor of anthropology, ethnology and prehistory, agrees with Rhotert. He has pointed out parallels to the Coffin Texts indicating that the figures are deceased souls floating in the waters of Nun. This is the same opinion confirmed by Egyptian anthropologist Yasser Al-Laithy in a field study of the cave. Dr. Al-Laithy believes that there is a clear similarity between the drawings of swimmers in the cave and the drawings of swimmers in Chapter Nine of the Book of Gates in the tomb of Ramesses VI. Therefore, the drawings of swimmers represent the souls of the dead swimming in the eternal waters of Nun.

Due to similar artwork being found in nearby rock shelters, such as the Cave of Beasts, and the continuous line that the figures create extending across a majority of the rock shelter's interior has led researchers to believe that the art may display developing concepts that were later adapted to the configuration of the Nile valley.

The rock shelter is mentioned in Michael Ondaatje's novel The English Patient. The film adaptation has a scene in it that has a guide describing in his native language to Almásy, who is portrayed as a character in both the novel and the film, the location that Almásy renders a drawing and includes some text that is then placed in the book that he keeps for himself. The rock shelter shown in the film is not the original but a film set created by a contemporary artist.

Substantial portions of the rock shelter have been irreversibly damaged by visitors over the years, especially since the film was released in 1996. Fragments of the paintings have been removed as souvenirs and some surfaces have cracked after water was applied to "enhance" their contrast for photographs. Modern graffiti have been inscribed upon the wall and tourist littering is a problem.

Steps have been taken to reduce future damage by training guides and clearing litter from the vicinity, but this important rock art site remains fragile and risks future disturbances as tourist traffic to the region increases.
