= Gilf Kebir =

Plateau in Egypt and Libya

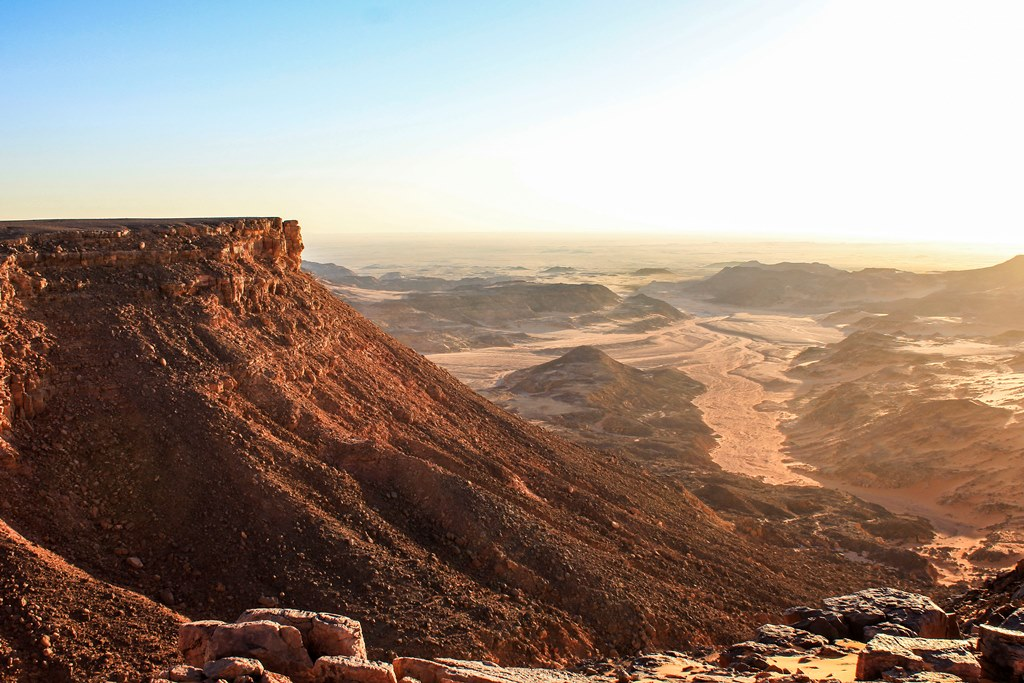
- View from the top of Gilf Kebir overlooking Wadi Sura

Highest point
- Elevation: 1,014 to 1,016 m (3,327 to 3,333 ft)
- Coordinates: 23°26′29″N 25°50′23″E

Geography
- Location within Egypt
- Country: Egypt

Gilf Kebir (جلف كبير) (var. Gilf al-Kebir, Jilf al Kabir, Gilf Kebir Plateau) is a plateau in the New Valley Governorate of the remote southwest corner of Egypt, and southeast Libya. Its name translates as "the Great Barrier". This 7,770 km^{2} (3,000 sq mi) sandstone plateau, roughly the size of Puerto Rico, rises 300 m (980 ft) from the Libyan Desert floor. It is the true heart of the Gilf Kebir National Park.

The name Gilf Kebir was given to the plateau by Prince Kamal el Dine Hussein in 1925, as it had no local name. It is known for its rugged beauty, remoteness, geological interest, and the dramatic cliff paintings-pictograph and rock carvings-petroglyph which depict an earlier era of abundant animal life and human habitation.

== Geography and climate ==
The Uweinat mountain range at the very south of the plateau extends from Egypt into Libya and Sudan.

=== Wadis ===
The plateau is crisscrossed by Wadis (dry, seasonal riverbeds). These include:

- Wadi Hamra وادي حمرا
- Wadi Akhdar وادى الاخضر
- Wadi Bakht وادى بخت
- Wadi Dayiq وادى الضيق
- Wadi Firaq وادى فراق
- Wadi Gazayir وادى الجزائر
- Wadi Maftuh وادى مفتوح
- Wadi Mashi وادى ماشى
- Wadi Sura وادي صورة
- Wadi Wassa وادى واسع
- Wadi Abd el-Malik وادي عبد المالك

=== Climate ===
Gilf Kebir Plateau lies in the heart of the eastern part of the vast Sahara Desert, and thus experiences an extremely hyper-arid climate. The area receives very little rainfall, with annual average precipitation hardly reaching 0.1 mm, and has a geological aridity index/dryness ratio of over 200, meaning that solar energy received at the ground evaporates more than 200 times the amount of precipitation received.

Climate data for Gilf Kebir Plateau
Month	Jan	Feb	Mar	Apr	May	Jun	Jul	Aug	Sep	Oct	Nov	Dec	Year
Mean daily maximum °C (°F)	20.8 (69.4)	23.6 (74.5)	27.8 (82.0)	33.8 (92.8)	36.6 (97.9)	38.3 (100.9)	38.7 (101.7)	38.6 (101.5)	37.2 (99.0)	32.3 (90.1)	26.3 (79.3)	22.1 (71.8)	31.3 (88.4)
Mean daily minimum °C (°F)	7.7 (45.9)	10 (50)	12.4 (54.3)	18.4 (65.1)	22.2 (72.0)	24.9 (76.8)	26.1 (79.0)	26.3 (79.3)	24.2 (75.6)	19.2 (66.6)	13.2 (55.8)	8.7 (47.7)	17.8 (64.0)
Source: Storm247.com

== History ==
=== Petroglyphs ===
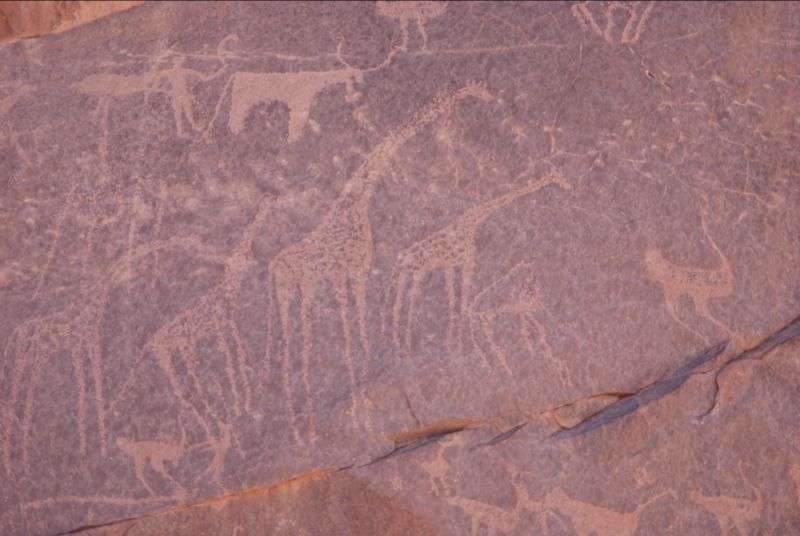
Ancient petroglyphs of a temperate era's giraffe, ostrich, and long-horned cow being herded

The Gilf Kebir is known for its prehistoric Neolithic petroglyphs

- Rock engravings in the upper part of wadi Hamra.
- Magharet el Kantara in the southern Gilf Kebir contains only one known rock art site, a cave discovered by Shaw & party in 1936.
- Wadi Sura in the southwestern Gilf Kebir: the "Cave of Swimmers", discovered by the Hungarian Count László Almásy (The English Patient), plus many other paintings nearby.
- In January 2003, Zerzura Expeditions and Jacopo Foggini independently discovered a major new rock art site in the Western Gilf Kebir (Foggini-Mestekawi Cave).
- The North-western half of the Gilf Kebir aside from Wadi Sura has only a few scattered engravings, of an apparently very ancient age.
- Karkur Talh and Karkur Murr: major eastern valleys of the Uweinat contain one of the richest concentrations of rock art in the whole Sahara.
- Western Uweinat: Shelters under the huge granite boulders in the western Uweinat contain numerous paintings, including the famous sites of Ain Doua.
- Jebel Arkenu, Jebel Kissu & Yerguehda Hill, the lesser granite massifs around Uweinat have many smaller sites.

Saharan rock art has been found to resemble the art of Nile valleys. The Saharan area was wetter until mid-Holocene or about 4000 BC, when the monsoon retreated southwards, forcing humans to migrate. Some retreated eastward to the Nile valley, taking with them their beliefs and influencing Egyptian art.

=== 20th century exploration ===
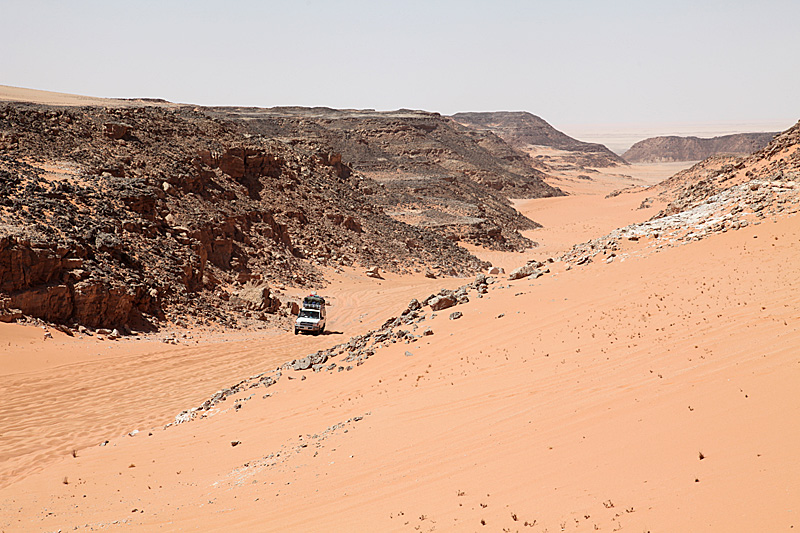
The Aqaba Pass

The hills of the Gilf Kebir were first seen from a distance by European explorers in 1910 - with W. J. Harding-King in 1910 and 1911, and Ball and Lieutenant Moore in 1918. The high southern part of the plateau was sighted for the first time by Prince Kamal el Dine Hussein in 1925, and on another expedition, in the following year, he fixed the eastern escarpment of the plateau and first realised the true size of the plateau. In 1930 an expedition headed by Ralph Alger Bagnold followed the same route. In the winter of 1930–1, P. A. Clayton surveyed some of the areas.

The western side of the Gilf Kebir was explored in 1932 by the Clayton-Almásy Expedition, headed by Sir Robert East Clayton and Count László E. Almásy, and accompanied by Patrick A. Clayton, Squadron Leader H. W. G. J. Penderel, three Arabian car drivers and a cook. The expedition explored the area by Gypsy Moth plane, by car, and on foot.

1933 Patrick Clayton and Ladislaus Almasy discovered the Aqaba-Pass, the only way up Gilf Kebir from the southern plains i.e. from wadi Sura.

=== WWII archeology ===
The plateau was the site for various British logistical operations during the Second World War, and due to the extremely dry conditions and lack of population, remains of this occupation are often found intact. A large airbase, including huge navigation arrows laid out in army petrol cans, can still be seen at the Eight Bells Hills spot in the southeast of Gilf Kebir.

It was also the site of the 2007 discovery of a bag that had been lost in the Second World War by a dispatch rider (Alec Ross) of the Long Range Desert Group, part of the British Army. This contained the rider's personal letters and photographs and had been well preserved.

== Literary setting ==
The Gilf Kebir is the setting for part of Michael Ondaatje's novel The English Patient. It also plays an important role in Paul Sussman's The Hidden Oasis.

== See also ==
- Libyan Desert
- Libyan desert glass
- Kebira Crater
- Cave of Swimmers
