= New Valley Governorate =

Governorate of Egypt

New Valley Governorate محافظة الوادي الجديد
- Governorate
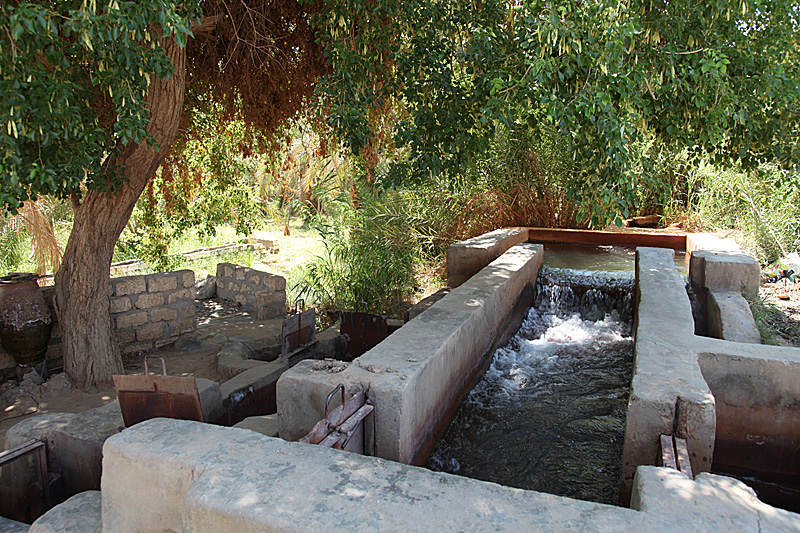

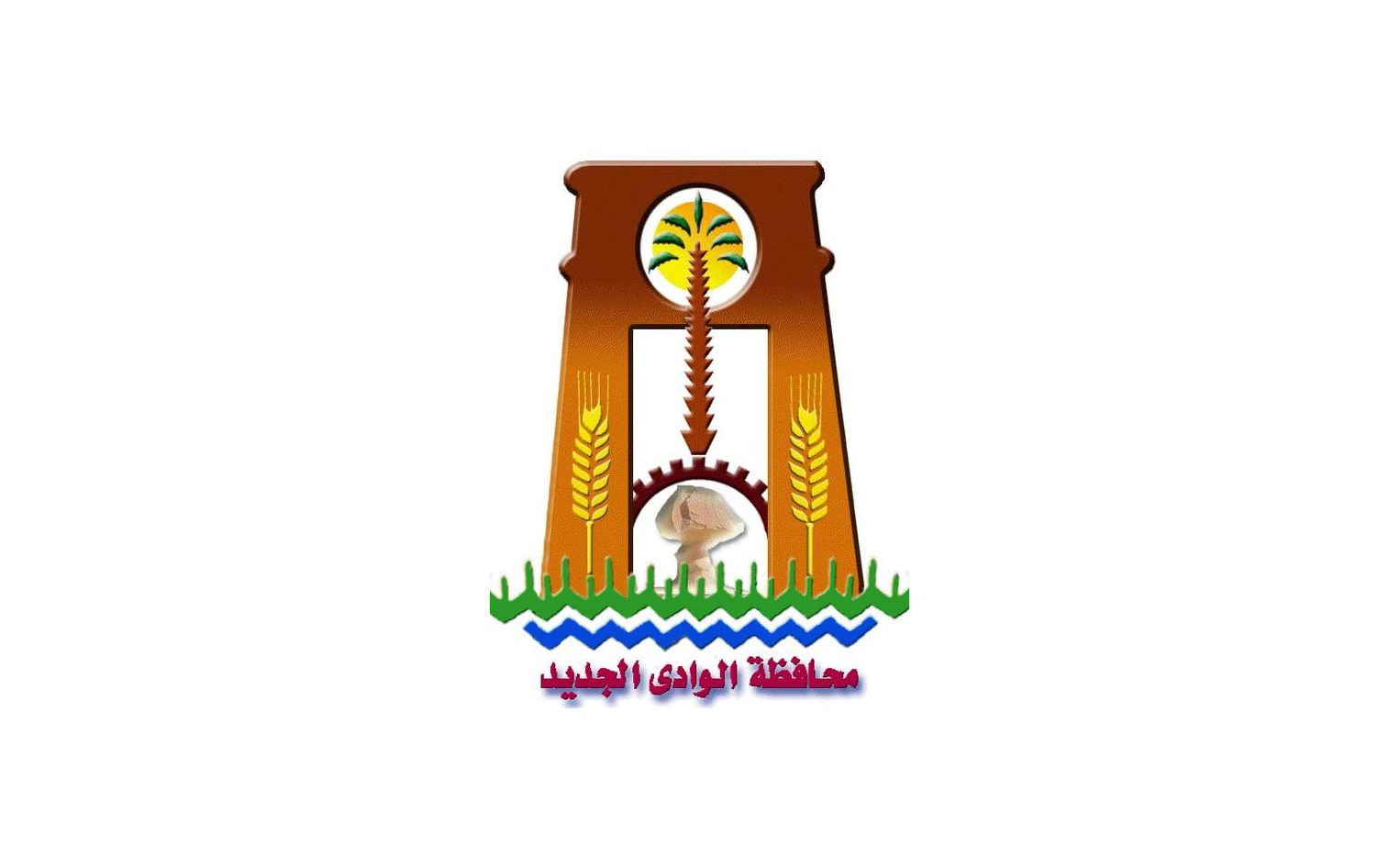
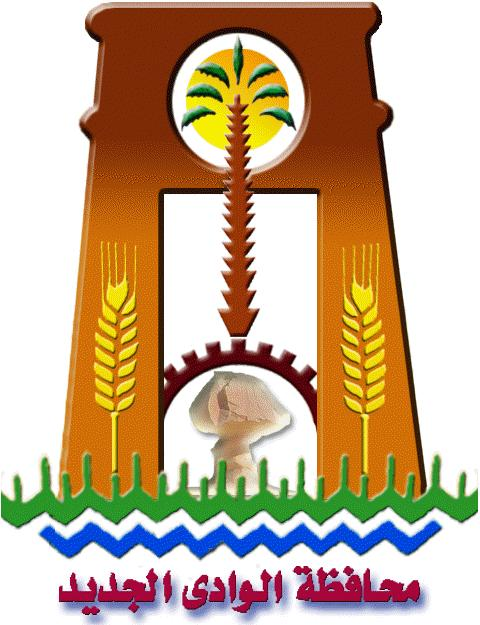
- Flag

- New Valley Governorate on the map of Egypt
- Coordinates: 24°32′44″N 27°10′24″E
- Country: Egypt
- Seat: Kharga

Government
  - Governor: Mohammed El-Zamalot

Area
  - Total: 440,098 km^{2} (169,923 sq mi)

Population (January 2024)
  - Total: 270,854
  - Density: 0.6/km^{2} (1.6/sq mi)

GDP
  - Total: EGP 17 billion (US$ 1.1 billion)
- Time zone: UTC+2 (EGY)
  - Summer (DST): UTC+3 (EEST)
- ISO 3166 code: EG-WAD
- HDI (2021): 0.738 high · 10th
- Website: www.newvalley.gov.eg

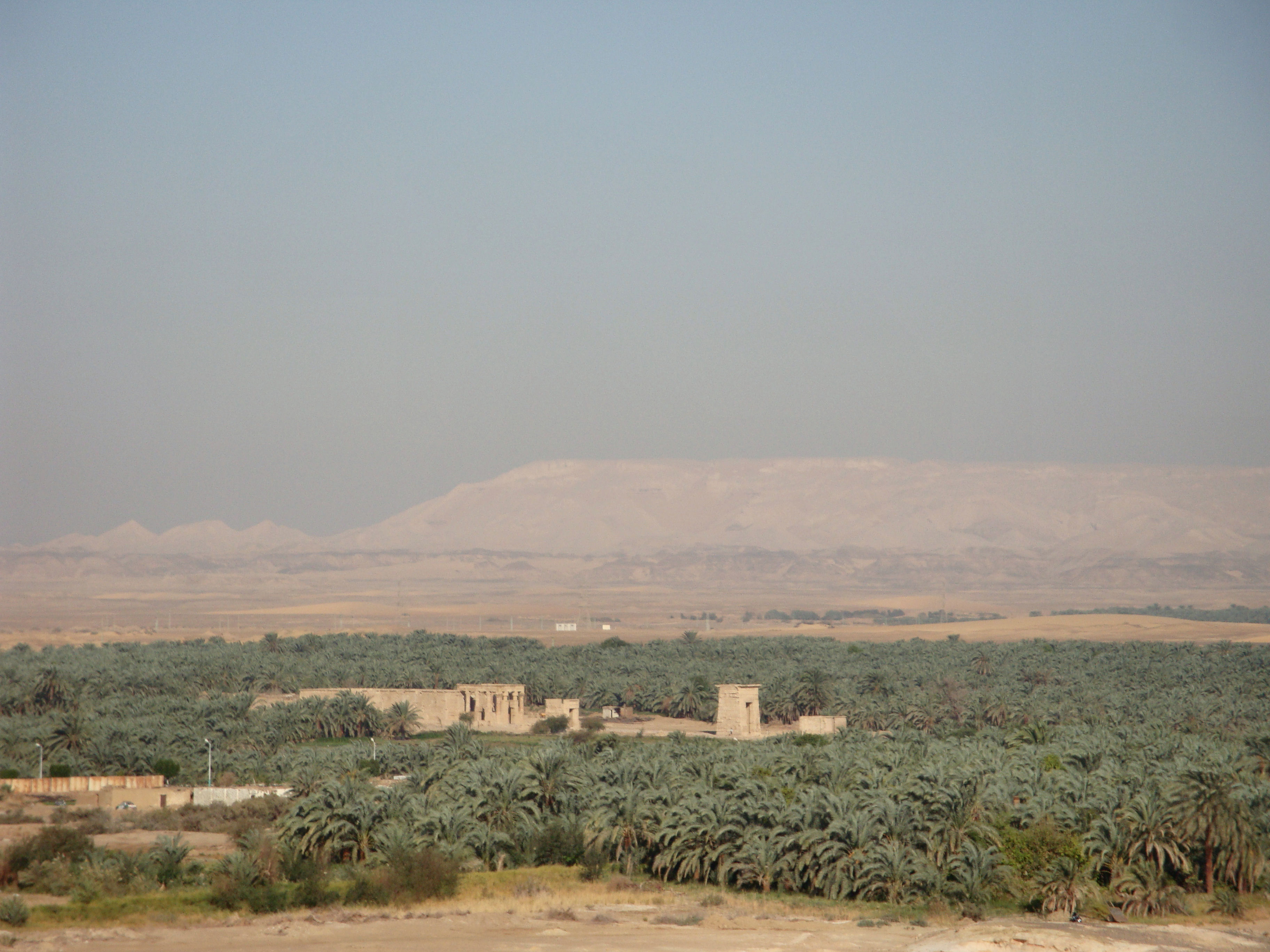
Kharga Oasis, with the Temple of Hibis; the Western Desert cliffs at the back

New Valley, or El Wadi El Gedid (Arabic: محافظة الوادي الجديد, romanized: Muḥāfaẓat al-Wādī al-Jadīd, Egyptian Arabic pronunciation: [moˈħɑfzˤet elˈwæːdi lɡɪˈdiːd]), is a governorate of Egypt. It is in the southwestern part of the country, in the southern Western Desert (part of the Sahara), between the Nile, northern Sudan, and southeastern Libya.

Comprising roughly half of Egypt's area, this governorate is the country's largest and most sparsely populated, and one of the largest country subdivisions in the world. The capital is Kharga. New Valley Governorate is named after the New Valley Project, which aims to irrigate parts of the Western Desert.

== Municipal divisions ==
The governorate is divided into municipal divisions with a total estimated population, as of January 2024, at 270,854. In the case of New Valley governorate, there is one kism with urban and rural parts, and four marakiz.

Municipal Divisions
Anglicized name	Native name	Arabic transliteration	Population (January 2023 Est.)	Type
Kharga	قسم الواحات الخارجة	Al-Wāḥāt al-Khārijah	104,683	Kism (urban and rural parts)
Balat	مركز بلاط	Balāṭ	13,025	Markaz
Dakhla	مركز الداخلة	Al-Dākhlah	95,019	Markaz
Farafra	مركز الفرافرة	Al-Farāfirah	37,509	Markaz
Baris	مركز باريس	Bārīs	14,767	Markaz

In an effort to decentralize the administration of Kharga, it was divided into four sections effective 19 June 2018.

== Population ==
According to population estimates, in 2015 the majority of residents in the governorate lived in rural areas, with an urbanization rate of only 48.0%. Out of an estimated 225,416 people residing in the governorate, 117,180 people lived in rural areas and only 108,236 lived in urban areas. In 2018 the population was 245,000, with an urbanization rate of 46.7%.

== Cities, towns, oases ==
New Valley has a number of cities, towns and oases. As of 2018, Kharga Oasis, and Dakhla Oasis were the two places in New Valley with a population of over 15,000. Farafra Oasis and Baris Oasis are also in New Valley.

Cities and towns with over 15,000 inhabitants
Anglicized name	Native name	Arabic transliteration	Nov. 1996 Census	Nov. 2006 Census	Population (July 2017 Est.)
Kharga Oasis	الخارجة	Al-Khārijah	49,446	60,584	72,558
Dakhla	الداخلة	Mūṭ (Ad-Dākhlah)	16,252	20,439	23,415

== Industrial zones ==
According to the Governing Authority for Investment and Free Zones (GAFI), the following industrial zones are located in the New Valley Governorate:

Zone name
Dakhla Industrial Zone in Mout
El Dakhla
Kharga Industrial Zone
Wadi Waer West

New Valley also contains some farming areas created by the New Valley project, like Sharq El Owainat.

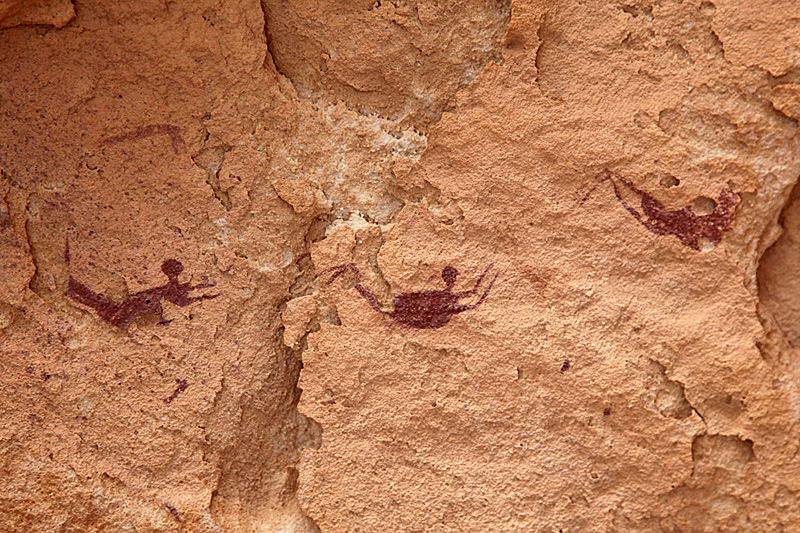
Wadi Sura Swimmers

== History ==
=== 2011 Egyptian revolution ===
Violent clashes were reported in the New Valley Governorate on February 8–9, 2011 as part of the 2011 Egyptian revolution. Protesters set fire to police stations and the National Democratic Party building. Multiple deaths were reported in addition to hundreds of injuries amid claims that the police opened fire on protesters in Kharga Oasis with live ammunition.

=== 2014 Farafra ambush ===
On 19 July 2014, unidentified gunmen ambushed a desert checkpoint by the Farafra Oasis Road in New Valley Governorate. Twenty-two border guards were killed in the attack, which was one of the biggest since the July 2013 ousting of Egyptian president Mohamed Morsi and the second at the same checkpoint in less than three months.

== Industry ==
- Farming of dates
- Tourism and safaris
- Agricultural activities (around oases)

== See also ==
- Gilf Kebir
- New Valley Project
