= Devil's stovepipe =

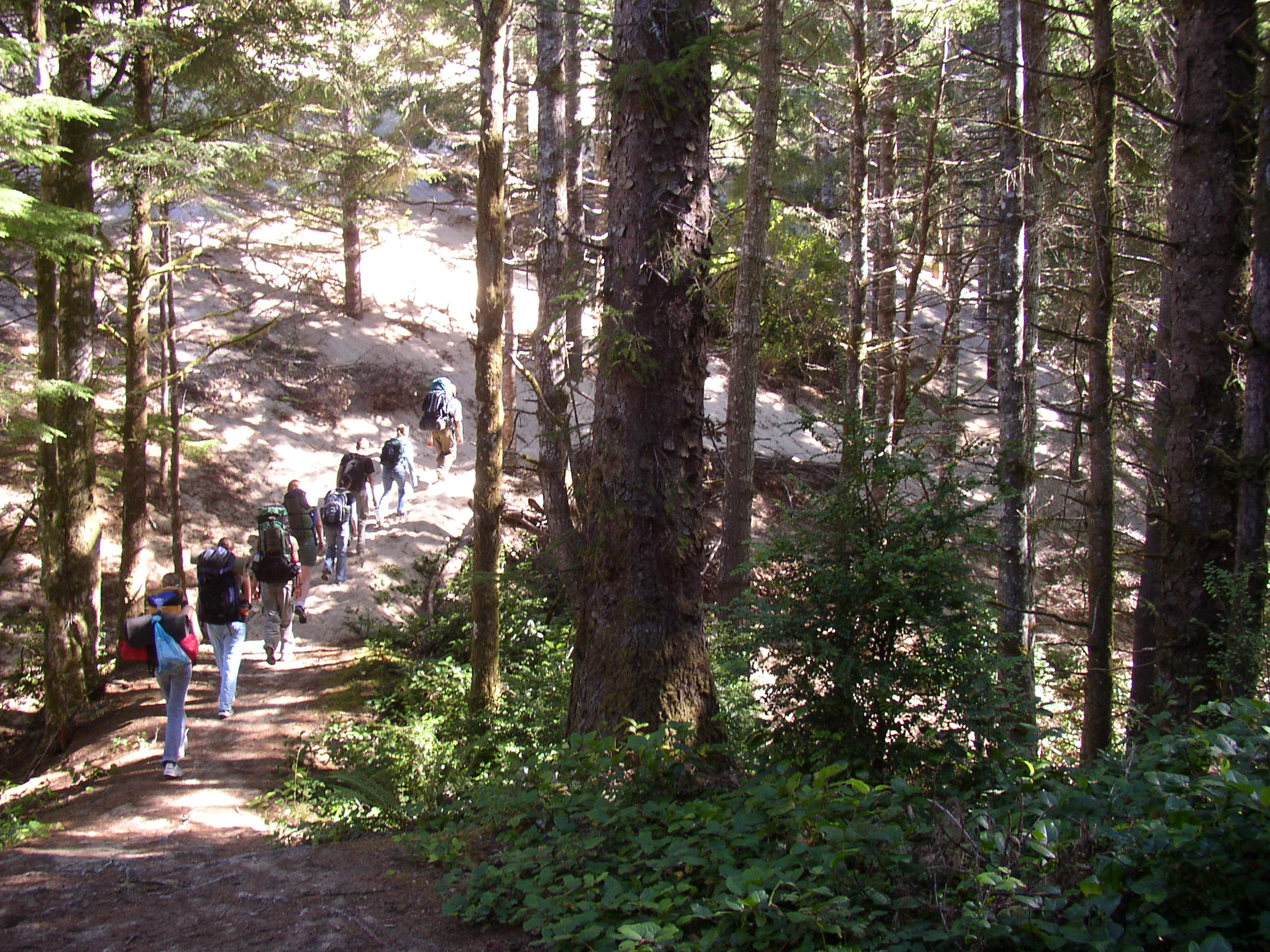
Hikers moving onto a dune encroaching on a forest in the Oregon Dunes. In time this may lead to devil's stovepipes in the area.

A devil's stovepipe or decomposition chimney is a hole formed when a tree, that has been buried by an encroaching sand dune, decomposes. Under certain conditions the bark will remain intact even after the core of the tree has rotted away. This cylinder of bark keeps the surrounding sand from collapsing in and thus creates a void, an unexpected occurrence in such an unstable medium.

Depending on the size of the tree from which it formed and its surface visibility, a devil's stovepipe may be quite dangerous. Someone passing above a wide stovepipe may fall in. Moreover, the fall is likely to disrupt the structure of the bark which had kept the hole open, thus allowing sand to fill the hole above them. For areas with large stovepipes there is a danger of suddenly becoming buried under significant quantities of sand.

== See also ==
- Dune
- Mount Baldy (sand dune): A parabolic dune within Indiana Dunes National Lakeshore where devil's stovepipes have been observed.
- Oregon Dunes National Recreation Area: An area in which devil's stovepipes occur.
