= Yellow dune =

Sand dune

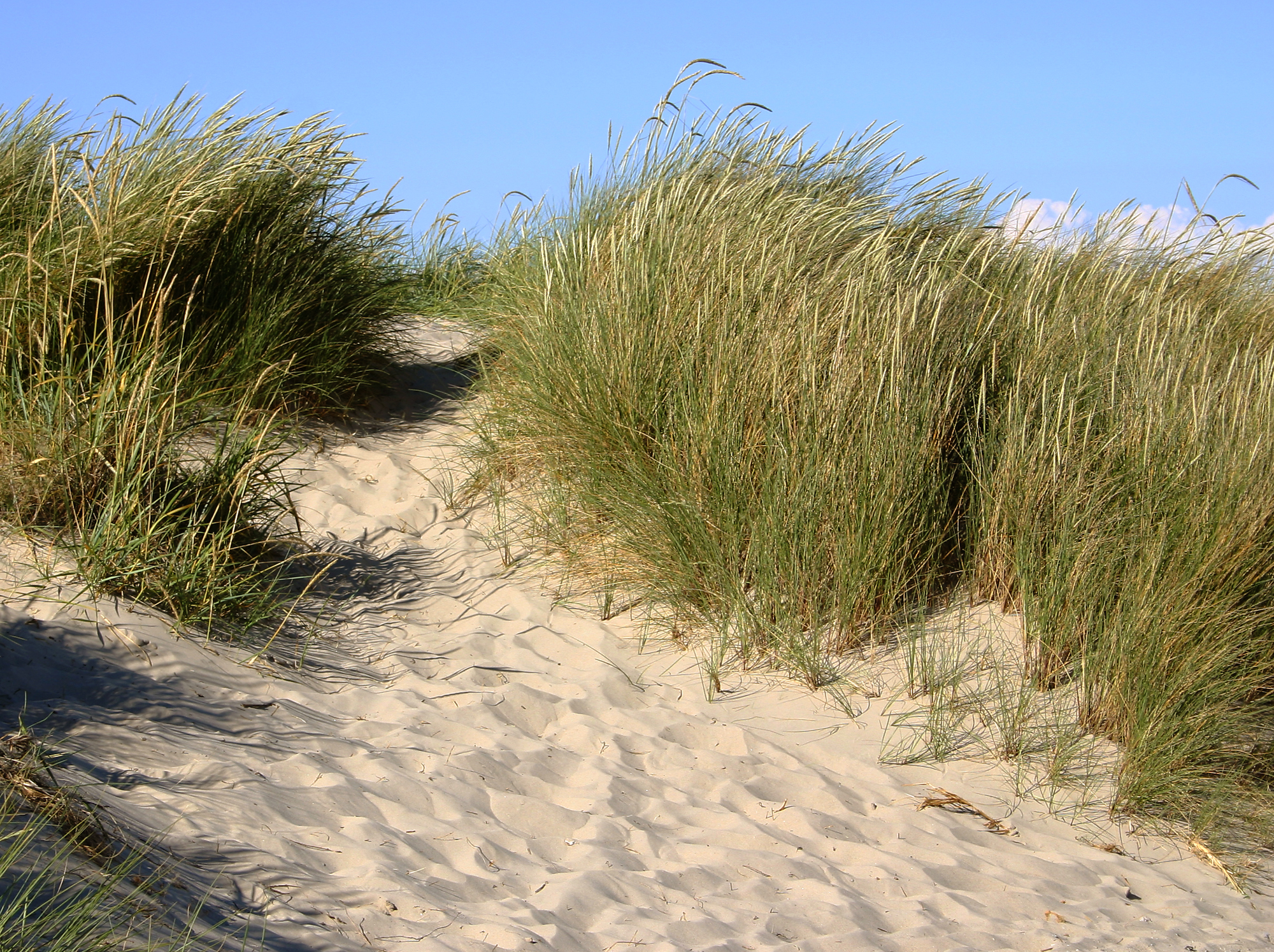
A yellow dune with Ammophila arenaria in Grenen, Denmark.

Yellow dunes are sand dunes that develop after the first set of embryo dunes appear. They have an average depth of about 5m and are composed primarily of sand. They are so named because their lack of humus gives them a yellow color.

The percentage of exposed sand on these dunes is generally about 20%. The remaining 80% is covered with vegetation that cannot withstand the conditions on the embryo dunes. The plants on these dunes can withstand the slightly alkaline sand An example of the plants would be marram grass spinifex.

The moisture content of these dunes is relatively low so the plants still have very strong root structures and are capable of getting every drop of water that comes their way.

As this dune develops, a new embryo dune will form in front.
