= Dune =

Hill of loose sand built by aeolian processes or the flow of water

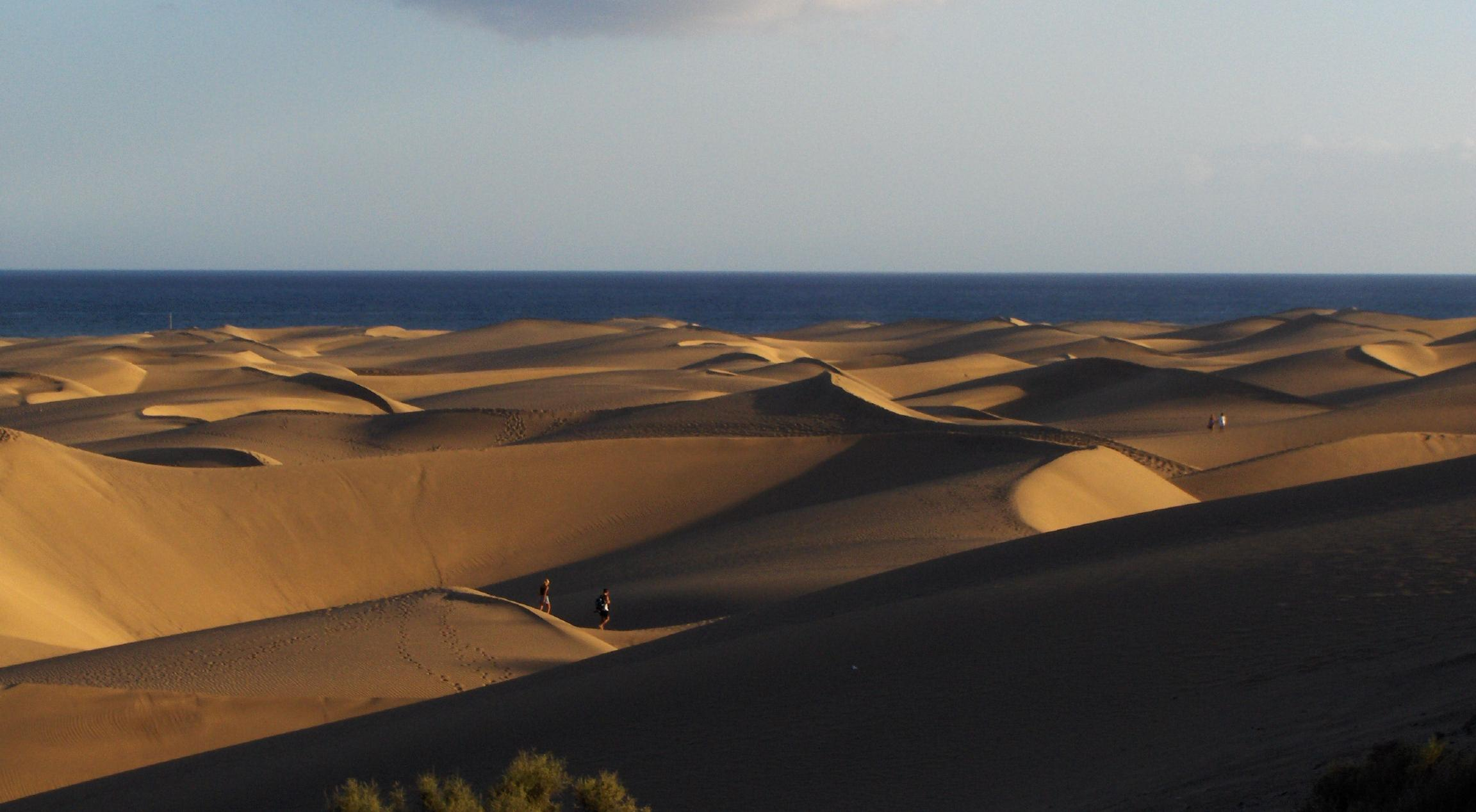
The Maspalomas Dunes of Gran Canaria, Canary Islands, Spain

A dune is a landform composed of wind- or water-driven sand. It typically takes the form of a mound, ridge, or hill. An area with dunes is called a dune system or a dune complex. A large dune complex is called a dune field, while broad, flat regions covered with wind-swept sand or dunes, with little or no vegetation, are called ergs or sand seas. Dunes occur in different shapes and sizes, but most kinds of dunes are longer on the stoss (upflow) side, where the sand is pushed up the dune, and have a shorter slip face in the lee side. The valley or trough between dunes is called a dune slack.

Dunes are most common in desert environments, where the lack of moisture hinders the growth of vegetation that would otherwise interfere with the development of dunes. However, sand deposits are not restricted to deserts, and dunes are also found along sea shores, along streams in semiarid climates, in areas of glacial outwash, and in other areas where poorly cemented sandstone bedrock disintegrates to produce an ample supply of loose sand. Subaqueous dunes can form from the action of water flow (fluvial processes) on sand or gravel beds of rivers, estuaries, and the sea-bed.

Some coastal areas have one or more sets of dunes running parallel to the shoreline directly inland from the beach. In most cases, the dunes are important in protecting the land against potential ravages by storm waves from the sea. Artificial dunes are sometimes constructed to protect coastal areas. The dynamic action of wind and water can sometimes cause dunes to drift, which can have serious consequences. For example, the town of Eucla, Western Australia, had to be relocated in the 1890s because of dune drift.

The modern word "dune" came into English from French around 1790, which in turn came from Middle Dutch dūne.

== Formation ==
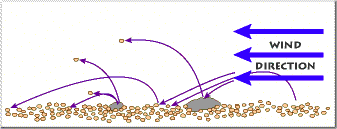
Sand hitting sand is more likely to stick; sand hitting a more coherent surface is more likely to bounce (saltation). This exacerbating feedback loop helps sand accumulate into dunes.

A universally precise distinction does not exist between ripples, dunes, and draas, which are all deposits of the same type of materials. Dunes are generally defined as greater than 7 cm tall and may have ripples, while ripples are deposits that are less than 3 cm tall. A draa is a very large aeolian landform, with a length of several kilometres and a height of tens to hundreds of meters, and which may have superimposed dunes.

Dunes are made of sand-sized particles, and may consist of quartz, calcium carbonate, snow, gypsum, or other materials. The upwind/upstream/upcurrent side of the dune is called the stoss side; the downflow side is called the lee side. Sand is pushed (creep) or bounces (saltation) up the stoss side, and slides down the lee side. A side of a dune that the sand has slid down is called a slip face (or slipface).

The Bagnold formula gives the speed at which particles can be transported.

== Aeolian dunes ==
=== Aeolian dune shapes ===
Five basic dune types are recognized: crescentic, linear, star, dome, and parabolic. Dune areas may occur in three forms: simple (isolated dunes of basic type), compound (larger dunes on which smaller dunes of same type form), and complex (combinations of different types).

==== Barchan or crescentic ====
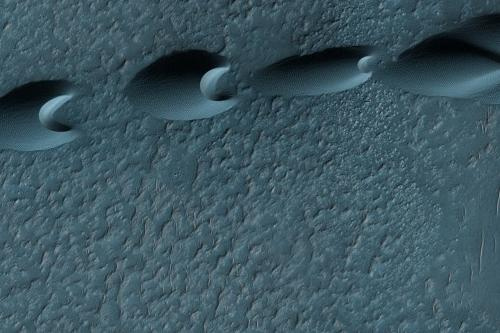
Isolated barchan dunes on the surface of Mars. Dominant wind direction would be from left to right.

Barchan dunes are crescent-shaped mounds which are generally wider than they are long. The lee-side slipfaces are on the concave sides of the dunes. These dunes form under winds that blow consistently from one direction (unimodal winds). They form separate crescents when the sand supply is comparatively small. When the sand supply is greater, they may merge into barchanoid ridges, and then transverse dunes (see below).

Some types of crescentic dunes move more quickly over desert surfaces than any other type of dune. A group of dunes moved more than 100 metres per year between 1954 and 1959 in China's Ningxia Province, and similar speeds have been recorded in the Western Desert of Egypt. The largest crescentic dunes on Earth, with mean crest-to-crest widths of more than three kilometres, are in China's Taklamakan Desert.

==== Transverse dunes ====
Abundant barchan dunes may merge into barchanoid ridges, which then grade into linear (or slightly sinuous) transverse dunes, so called because they lie transverse, or across, the wind direction, with the wind blowing perpendicular to the ridge crest.

==== Seif or longitudinal dunes ====
Seif dunes are linear (or slightly sinuous) dunes with two slip faces. The dunes lie generally parallel to each other The two slip faces make them sharp-crested. They are called seif dunes after the Arabic word for "sword". They may be more than 160 kilometres (100 miles) long, and thus easily visible in satellite images (see illustrations).

Seif dunes are associated with bidirectional winds. The long axes and ridges of these dunes extend along the resultant direction of sand movement (hence the name "longitudinal"). Some linear dunes merge to form Y-shaped compound dunes.

Formation is debated. Ralph Bagnold, in The Physics of Blown Sand and Desert Dunes, suggested that some seif dunes form when a barchan dune moves into a bidirectional wind regime, and one arm or wing of the crescent elongates. Others suggest that seif dunes are formed by vortices in a unidirectional wind. In the sheltered troughs between highly developed seif dunes, barchans may be formed, because the wind is constrained to be unidirectional by the dunes.

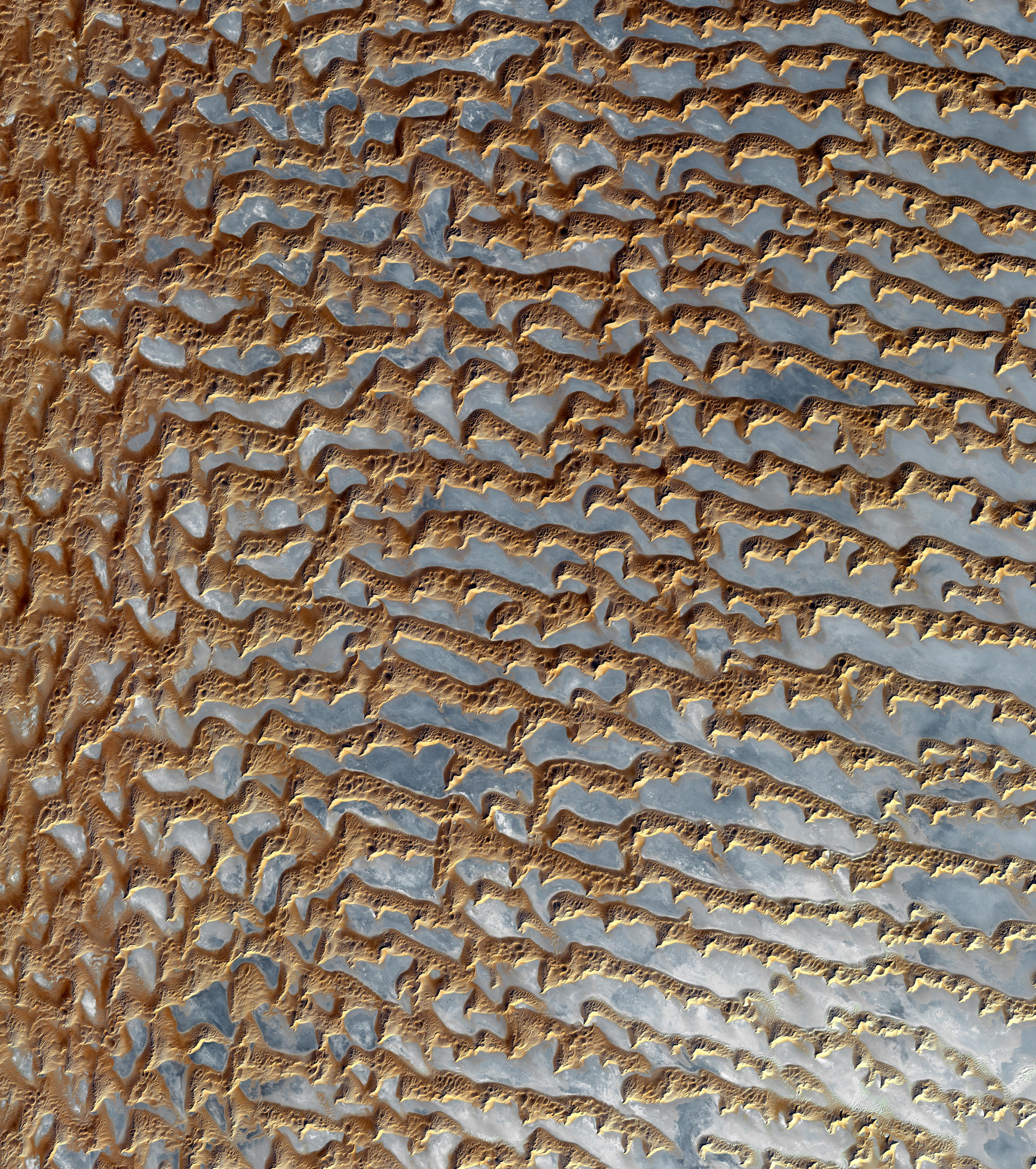
Rub' al Khali (Arabian Empty Quarter) sand dunes imaged by Terra (EOS AM-1). Most of these dunes are seif dunes. Their origin from barchans is suggested by the stubby remnant "hooks" seen on many of the dunes. Wind would be from left to right.

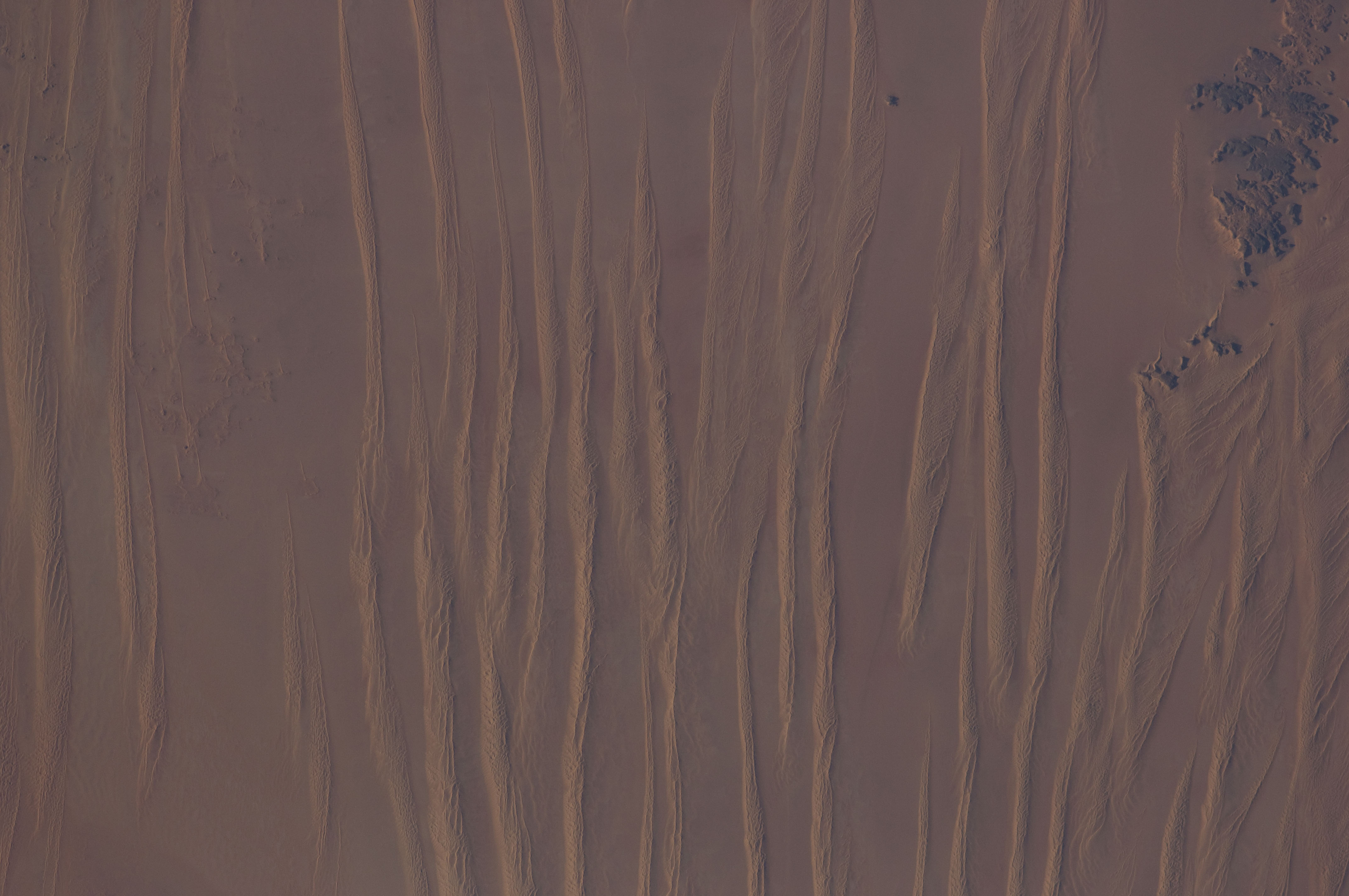
Large linear seif dunes in the Great Sand Sea in southwest Egypt, seen from the International Space Station. The distance between each dune is 1.5–2.5 km (0.93–1.55 mi).

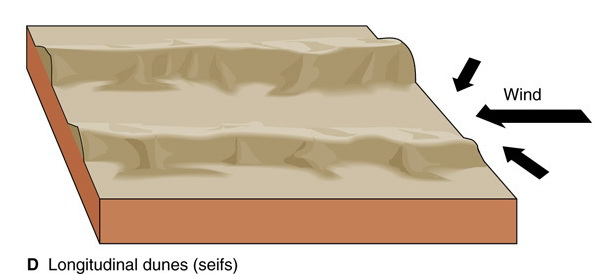
The average-direction-longitudinal model of seif dune formation

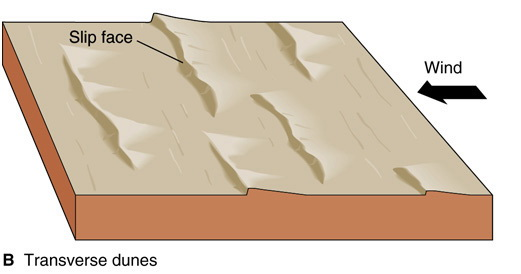
By contrast, transverse dunes form with the wind blowing perpendicular to the ridges, and have only one slipface, on the lee side. The stoss side is less steep.

Transverse dunes lie perpendicular to the wind, which moves them forwards, producing the cross-bedding shown here.

Seif dunes are common in the Sahara. They range up to 300 m (980 ft) in height and 300 km (190 mi) in length. In the southern third of the Arabian Peninsula, a vast erg, called the Rub' al Khali or Empty Quarter, contains seif dunes that stretch for almost 200 km (120 mi) and reach heights of over 300 m (980 ft).

Linear loess hills known as pahas are superficially similar. These hills appear to have been formed during the last ice age under permafrost conditions dominated by sparse tundra vegetation.

==== Star ====
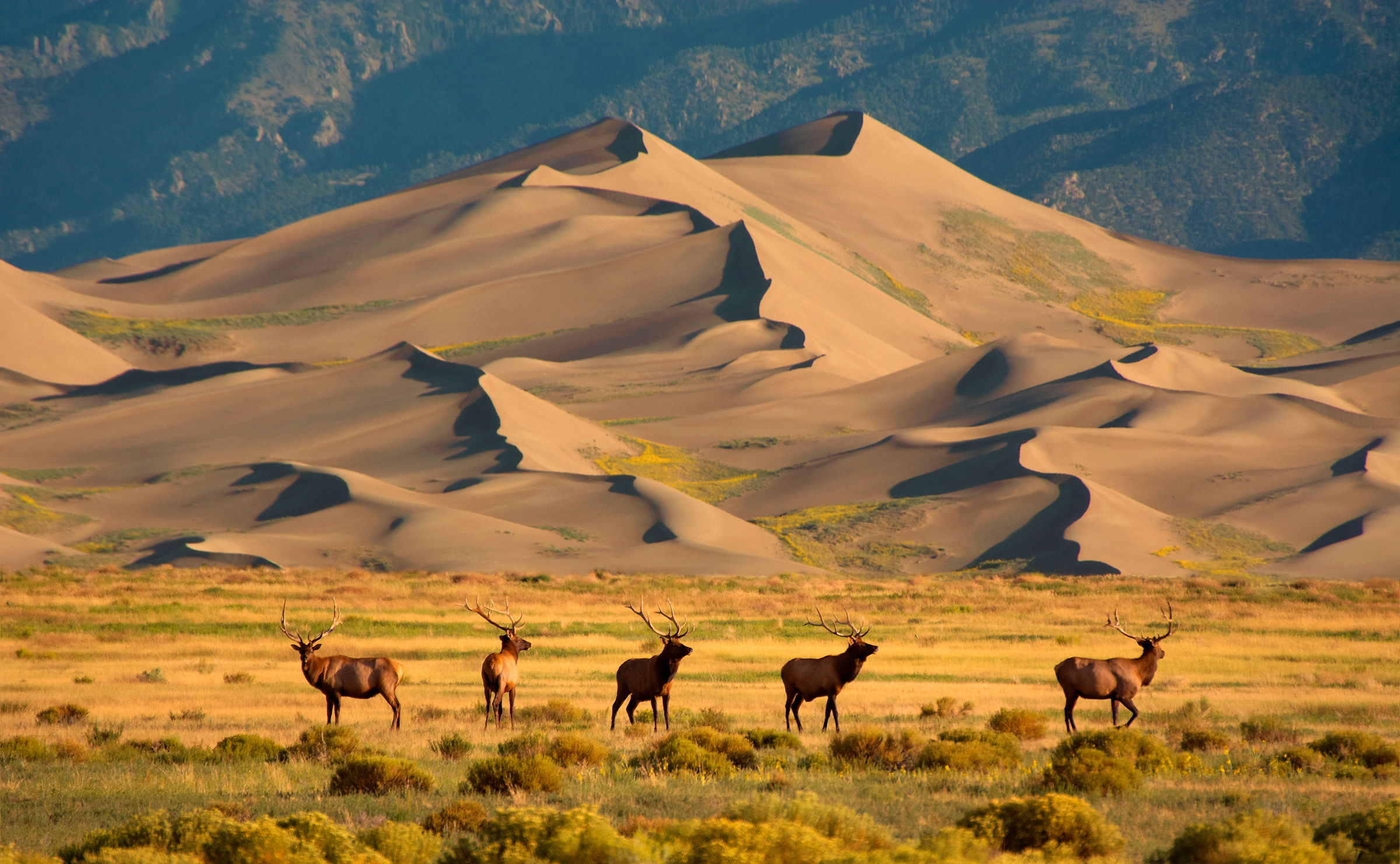
Star dunes with a rough pyramidal shape and ridges at Great Sand Dunes National Park and Preserve

Star dunes are pyramidal sand mounds with slipfaces on three or more arms that radiate from the high centre of the mound. They tend to accumulate in areas with multidirectional wind regimes. Star dunes grow upward rather than laterally.The wind constantly rearranges the sand into these shapes. Nevertheless, precise GPS measurements have detected migration of the dunes in several locations. They dominate the Grand Erg Oriental of the Sahara. In other deserts, they occur around the margins of the sand seas, particularly near topographic barriers. In the southeast Badain Jaran Desert of China, the star dunes are up to 500 metres tall and may be the tallest dunes outside South America.

==== Dome ====
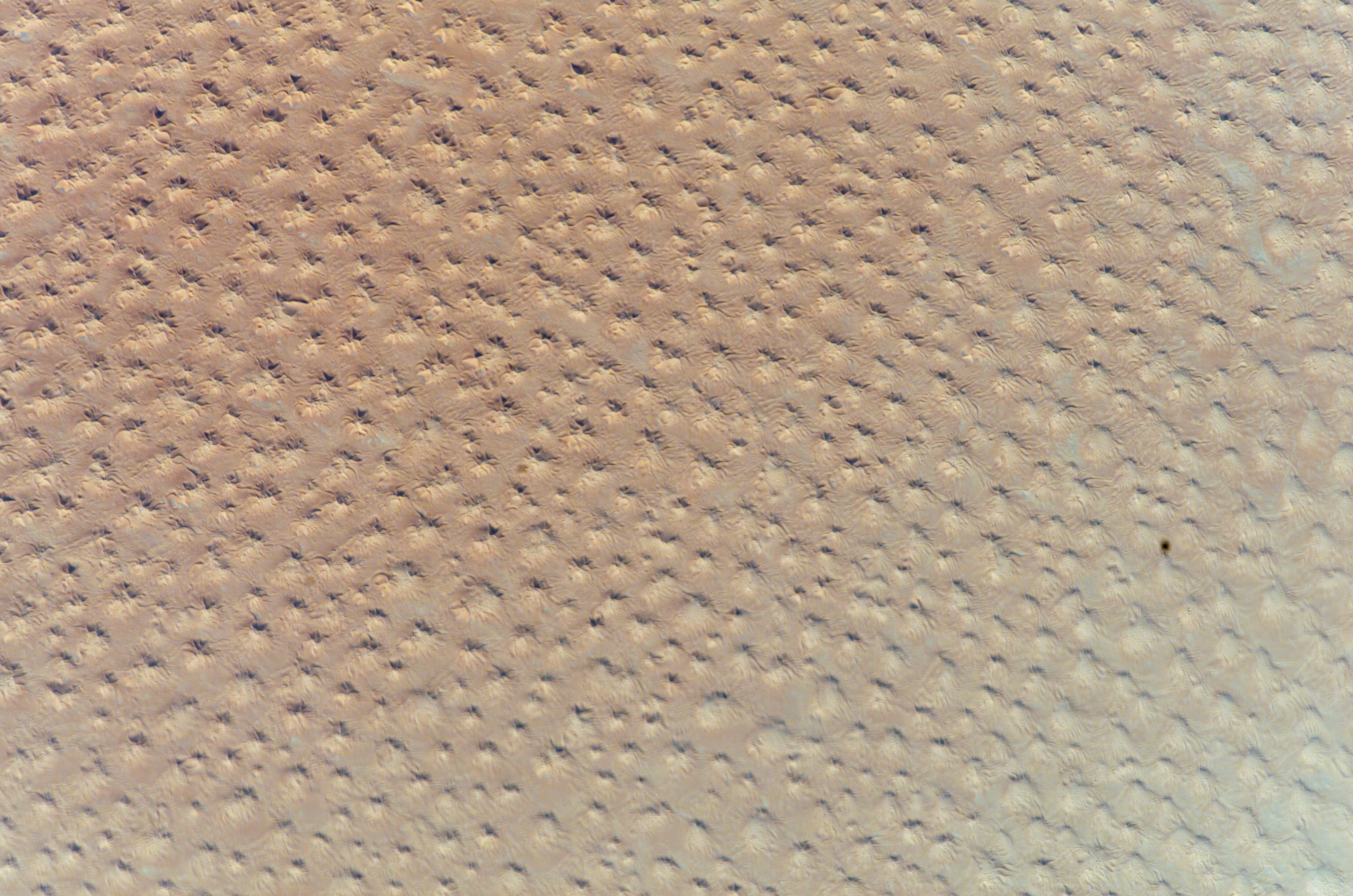
Grand Erg Oriental: centre and left: star dunes, right edge: mega-domes

Dome dunes are circular to oval sand bodies with the shape of a flat dome, without a slip face. There are two types of dome dunes: Small dome dunes with domes that are only a few meters high and have a smooth surface. The second type are mega-domes. These are similar in size to star dunes, with the largest reaching a maximum height of 150 m (490 ft) (Nejd region in Saudi Arabia) and a diameter of over 1.5 km (0.93 mi) (Grand Erg Oriental). They are covered with a dense network of secondary dunes. Sometimes fine sand ridges lead away from them, similar to star dunes. Viewed from above, they resemble an insect with a ribbed shell. Mega-domes are rare and occur at the far upwind margins of sand seas. They are often neighbours of larger groups of star dunes. The star dunes there have the same shape, but with a steep pyramid on top. Scientific research is needed to clarify the difference in wind regimes between mega-domes and their neighbouring star dunes.

===== Lunettes =====
Fixed crescentic dunes that form on the leeward margins of playas and river valleys in arid and semiarid regions in response to the direction (s) of prevailing winds, are known as lunettes, source-bordering dunes, bourrelets and clay dunes. They may be composed of clay, silt, sand, or gypsum, eroded from the basin floor or shore, transported up the concave side of the dune, and deposited on the convex side. Examples in Australia are up to 6.5 km long, 1 km wide, and up to 50 metres high. They also occur in southern and West Africa, and in parts of the western United States, especially Texas.

==== Parabolic ====
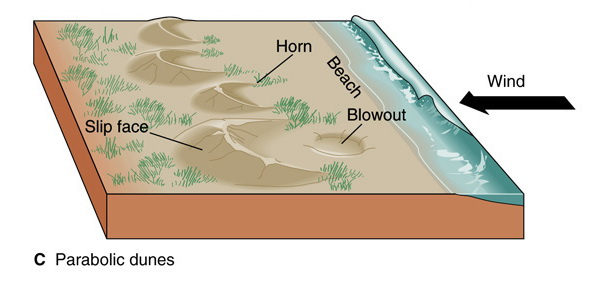
Schematic of coastal parabolic dunes

U-shaped mounds of sand with convex noses trailed by elongated arms are parabolic dunes. These dunes are formed from blowout dunes where the erosion of vegetated sand leads to a U-shaped depression. The elongated arms are held in place by vegetation; the largest arm known on Earth reaches 12 km. Sometimes these dunes are called U-shaped, blowout, or hairpin dunes, and they are well known in coastal deserts. Unlike crescent shaped dunes, their crests point upwind. The bulk of the sand in the dune migrates forward.

In plan view, these are U-shaped or V-shaped mounds of well-sorted, very fine to medium sand with elongated arms that extend upwind behind the central part of the dune. There are slipfaces that often occur on the outer side of the nose and on the outer slopes of the arms.

These dunes often occur in semiarid areas where the precipitation is retained in the lower parts of the dune and underlying soils. The stability of the dunes was once attributed to the vegetative cover but recent research has pointed to water as the main source of parabolic dune stability. The vegetation that covers them—grasses, shrubs, and trees—help anchor the trailing arms. In inland deserts, parabolic dunes commonly originate and extend downwind from blowouts in sand sheets only partly anchored by vegetation. They can also originate from beach sands and extend inland into vegetated areas in coastal zones and on shores of large lakes.

Most parabolic dunes do not reach heights higher than a few tens of metres except at their nose, where vegetation stops or slows the advance of accumulating sand.

Simple parabolic dunes have only one set of arms that trail upwind, behind the leading nose. Compound parabolic dunes are coalesced features with several sets of trailing arms. Complex parabolic dunes include subsidiary superposed or coalesced forms, usually of barchanoid or linear shapes.

Parabolic dunes, like crescent dunes, occur in areas where very strong winds are mostly unidirectional. Although these dunes are found in areas now characterized by variable wind speeds, the effective winds associated with the growth and migration of both the parabolic and crescent dunes probably are the most consistent in wind direction.

The grain size for these well-sorted, very fine to medium sands is about 0.06 to 0.5 mm (0.0024 to 0.0197 in). Parabolic dunes have loose sand and steep slopes only on their outer flanks. The inner slopes are mostly well packed and anchored by vegetation, as are the corridors between individual dunes. Because all dune arms are oriented in the same direction, and, the inter-dune corridors are generally swept clear of loose sand, the corridors can usually be traversed in between the trailing arms of the dune. However to cross straight over the dune by going over the trailing arms, can be very difficult. Also, traversing the nose is very difficult as well because the nose is usually made up of loose sand without much if any vegetation.

A type of extensive parabolic dune that lacks discernible slipfaces and has mostly coarse grained sand is known as a zibar. The term zibar comes from the Arabic word to describe "rolling transverse ridges ... with a hard surface". The dunes are small, have low relief, and can be found in many places across the planet from Wyoming (United States) to Saudi Arabia to Australia. Spacing between zibars ranges from 50 to 400 m (160 to 1,310 ft) and they do not become more than 10 m (33 ft) high. The dunes form at about ninety degrees to the prevailing wind which blows away the small, fine-grained sand leaving behind the coarser grained sand to form the crest.

==== Reversing dunes ====
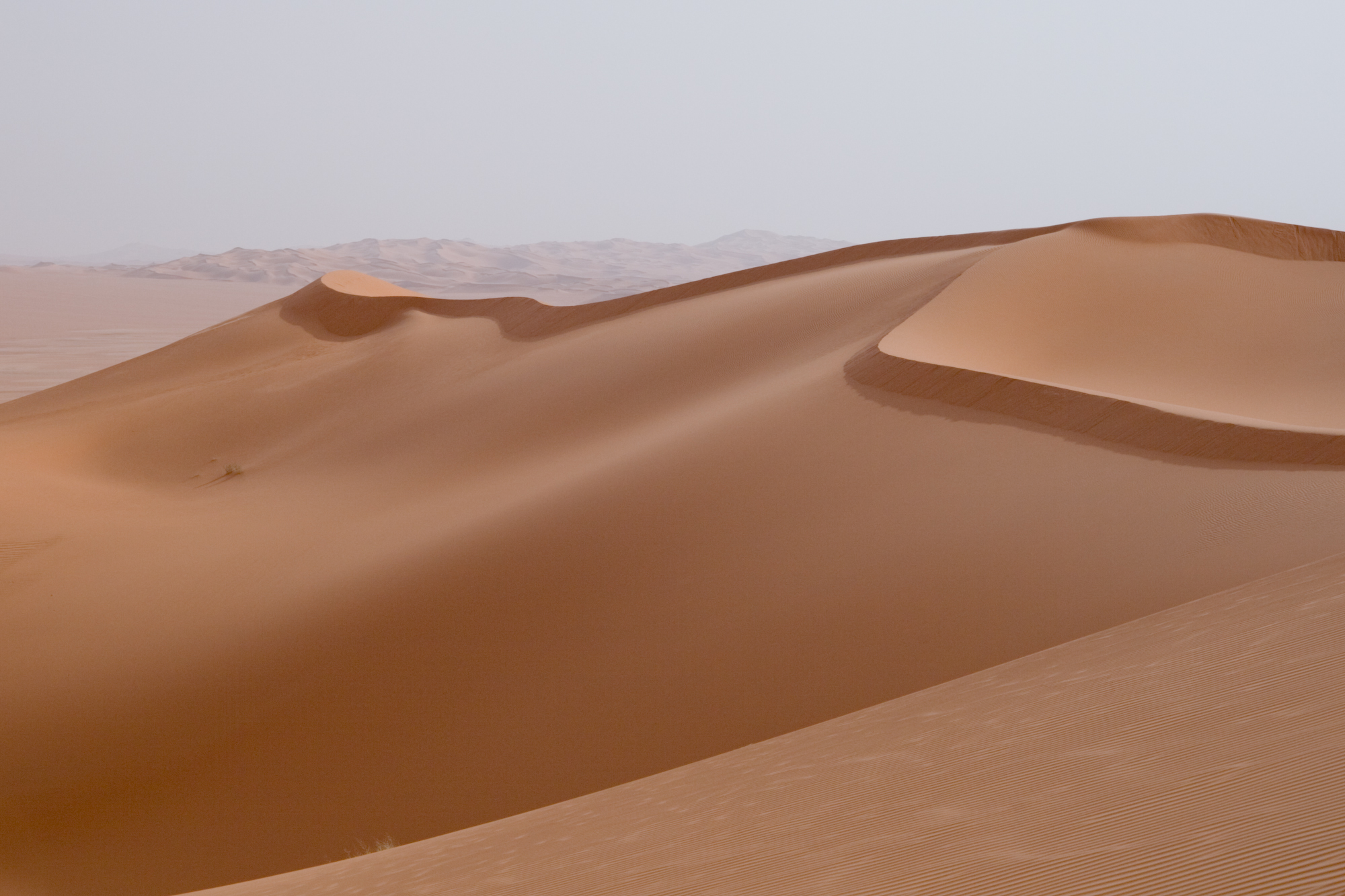
Reversing dune showing short minor slipface atop the major stoss (upwind) face

Occurring wherever winds periodically reverse direction, reversing dunes are varieties of any of the above shapes. These dunes typically have major and minor slipfaces oriented in opposite directions. The minor slipfaces are usually temporary, as they appear after a reverse wind and are generally destroyed when the wind next blows in the dominant direction.

==== Draas ====
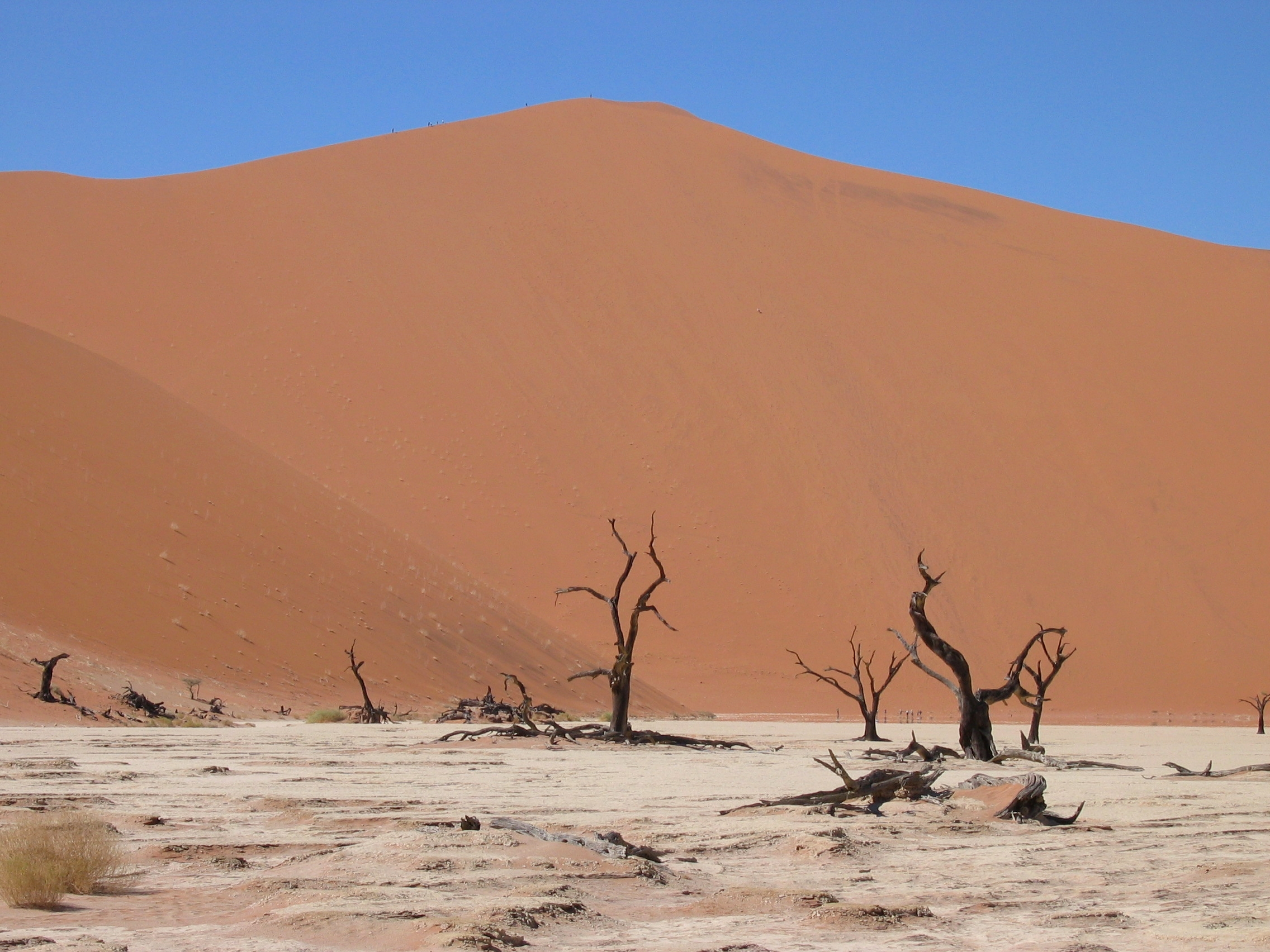
Dune Nine in Sossusvlei, Namibia, is over 300m high.

Draas are very large-scale dune bedforms; they may be tens or a few hundreds of metres in height, kilometres wide, and hundreds of kilometres in length. After a draa has reached a certain size, it generally develops superimposed dune forms. They are thought to be more ancient and slower-moving than smaller dunes, and to form by vertical growth of existing dunes. Draas are widespread in sand seas and are well-represented in the geological record.

=== Dune complexity ===
All these dune shapes may occur in three forms: simple (isolated dunes of basic type), compound (larger dunes on which smaller dunes of same type form), and complex (combinations of different types). Simple dunes are basic forms with the minimum number of slipfaces that define the geometric type. Compound dunes are large dunes on which smaller dunes of similar type and slipface orientation are superimposed. Complex dunes are combinations of two or more dune types. A crescentic dune with a star dune superimposed on its crest is the most common complex dune. Simple dunes represent a wind regime that has not changed in intensity or direction since the formation of the dune, while compound and complex dunes suggest that the intensity and direction of the wind has changed.

=== Dune movement ===
The sand mass of dunes can move either windward or leeward, depending on if the wind is making contact with the dune from below or above its apogee. If wind hits from above, the sand particles move leeward; the leeward flux of sand is greater than the windward flux. Conversely, if sand hits from below, sand particles move windward. Further, if the wind is carrying sand particles when it hits the dune, the dune's sand particles will saltate more than if the wind had hit the dune without carrying sand particles.

=== Coastal dunes ===
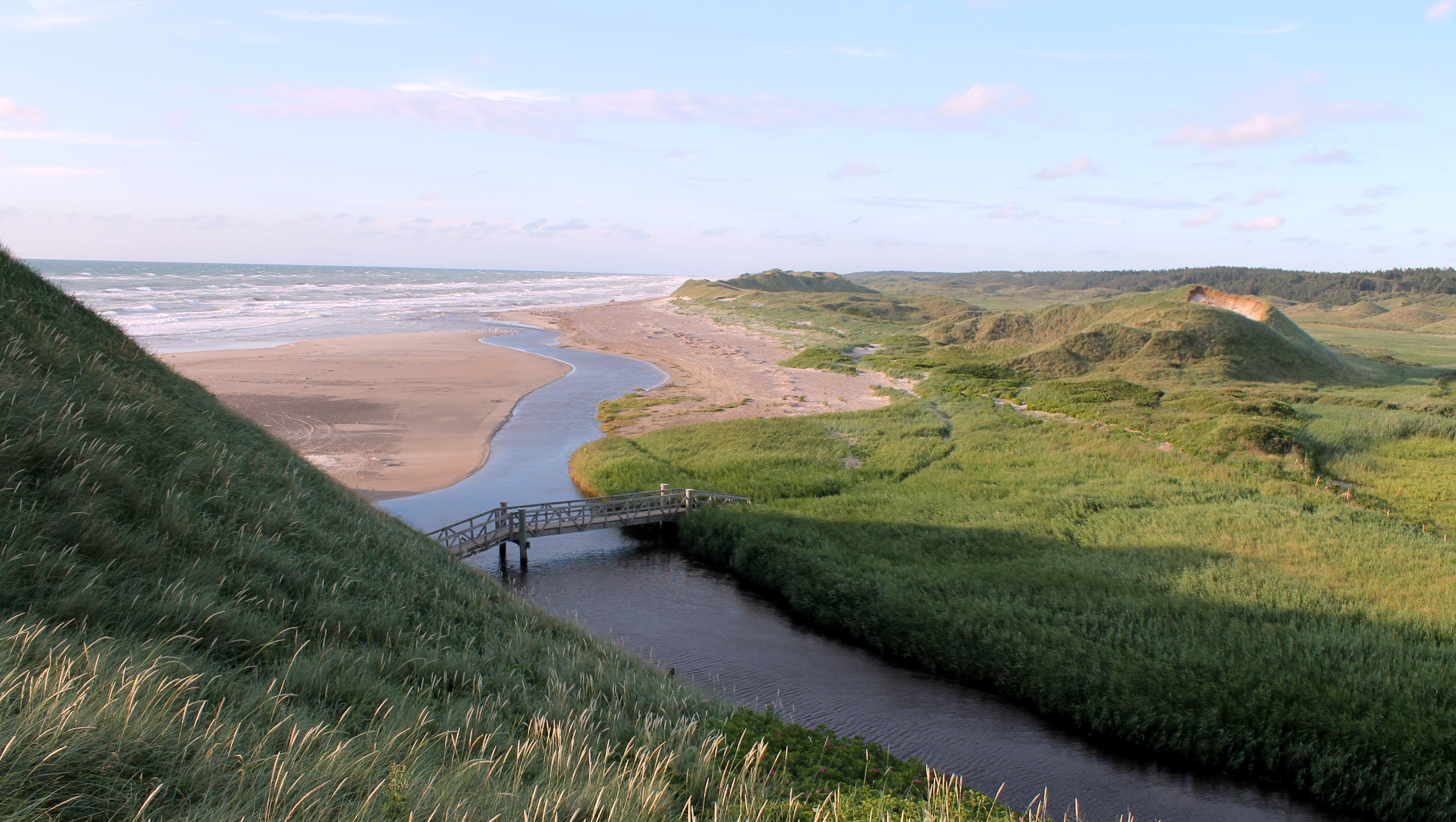
Coastal dunes covered in grasses around the mouth of the Liver Å river in Denmark

Newborough Dune Rejuvenation, Wales; video of work done by Natural Resources Wales; 2015

Coastal dunes form when wet sand is deposited along the coast and dries out and is blown along the beach. Dunes form where the beach is wide enough to allow for the accumulation of wind-blown sand, and where prevailing onshore winds tend to blow sand inland. The three key ingredients for coastal dune formation are a large sand supply, winds to move said sand supply, and a place for the sand supply to accumulate. Obstacles—for example, vegetation, pebbles and so on—tend to slow down the wind and lead to the deposition of sand grains. These small "incipient dunes" or "shadow dunes" tend to grow in the vertical direction if the obstacle slowing the wind can also grow vertically (i.e., vegetation). Coastal dunes expand laterally as a result of lateral growth of coastal plants via seed or rhizome. Models of coastal dunes suggest that their final equilibrium height is related to the distance between the water line and where vegetation can grow. Coastal dunes can be classified by where they develop, or begin to take shape. Dunes are commonly grouped into either the Primary Dune Group or the Secondary Dune Group. Primary dunes gain most of their sand from the beach itself, while secondary dunes gain their sand from the primary dune. Along the Florida Panhandle, most dunes are considered to be foredunes or hummocks. Different locations around the globe have dune formations unique to their given coastal profile.

Coastal sand dunes can provide privacy and/or habitats to support local flora and fauna. Animals such as sand snakes, lizards, and rodents can live in coastal sand dunes, along with insects of all types. Often the vegetation of sand dunes is discussed without acknowledging the importance that coastal dunes have for animals. Further, some animals, such as foxes and feral pigs can use coastal dunes as hunting grounds to find food. Birds are also known to utilize coastal dunes as nesting grounds. All these species find the coastal environment of the sand dune vital to their species' survival.

Over the course of time coastal dunes may be impacted by tropical cyclones or other intense storm activity, dependent on their location. Recent work has suggested that coastal dunes tend to evolve toward a high or low morphology depending on the growth rate of dunes relative to storm frequency. During a storm event, dunes play a significant role in minimizing wave energy as it moves onshore. As a result, coastal dunes, especially those in the foredune area affected by a storm surge, will retreat or erode. To counteract the damage from tropical activity on coastal dunes, short term post-storm efforts can be made by individual agencies through fencing to help with sand accumulation.

How much a dune erodes during any storm surge is related to its location on the coastal shoreline and the profile of the beach during a particular season. In those areas with harsher winter weather, during the summer a beach tends to take on more of a convex appearance due to gentler waves, while the same beach in the winter may take on more of a concave appearance. As a result, coastal dunes can get eroded much more quickly in the winter than in the summer. The converse is true in areas with harsher summer weather.

There are many threats to these coastal communities. Some coastal dunes, for example ones in San Francisco, have been completely altered by urbanization; reshaping the dune for human use. This puts native species at risk. Another danger, in California and places in the UK specifically, is the introduction of invasive species. Plant species, such as Carpobrotus edulis, were introduced from South Africa in an attempt to stabilize the dunes and provide horticultural benefits, but instead spread taking land away from native species. Ammophila arenaria, known as European beachgrass, has a similar story, though it has no horticulture benefits. It has great ground coverage and, as intended, stabilized the dunes but as an unintended side effect prevented native species from thriving in those dunes. One such example is the dune field at Point Reyes, California. There are now efforts to get rid of both of these invasive species.

==== Ecological succession on coastal dunes ====
As a dune forms, plant succession occurs. The conditions on an embryo dune are harsh, with salt spray from the sea carried on strong winds. The dune is well drained and often dry, and composed of calcium carbonate from seashells. Rotting seaweed, brought in by storm waves adds nutrients to allow pioneer species to colonize the dune. For example, in the United Kingdom these pioneer species are often marram grass, sea wort grass and other sea grasses. These plants are well adapted to the harsh conditions of the foredune, typically having deep roots which reach the water table, root nodules that produce nitrogen compounds, and protected stoma, reducing transpiration. Also, the deep roots bind the sand together, and the dune grows into a foredune as more sand is blown over the grasses. The grasses add nitrogen to the soil, meaning other, less hardy plants can then colonize the dunes. Typically these are heather, heaths and gorses. These too are adapted to the low soil water content and have small, prickly leaves which reduce transpiration. Heather adds humus to the soil and is usually replaced by coniferous trees, which can tolerate low soil pH, caused by the accumulation and decomposition of organic matter with nitrate leaching. Coniferous forests and heathland are common climax communities for sand dune systems.

Young dunes are called yellow dunes and dunes which have high humus content are called grey dunes. Leaching occurs on the dunes, washing humus into the slacks, and the slacks may be much more developed than the exposed tops of the dunes. It is usually in the slacks that more rare species are developed and there is a tendency for the dune slacks' soil to be waterlogged where only marsh plants can survive. In Europe these plants include: creeping willow, cotton grass, yellow iris, reeds, and rushes. As for vertebrates in European dunes, natterjack toads sometimes breed here.

==== Coastal dune floral adaptations ====
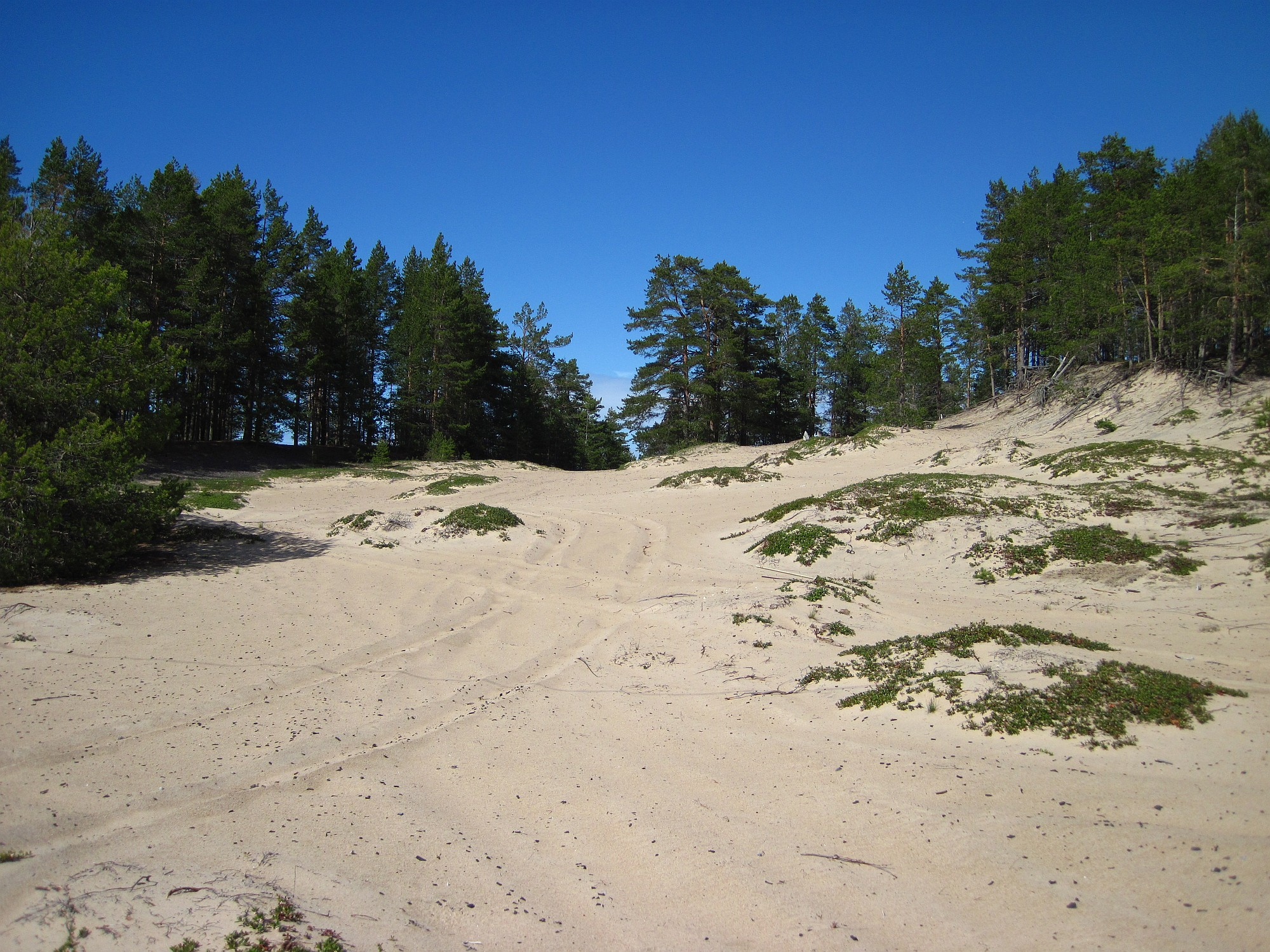
Sand dunes of Hyypänmäki in Hailuoto, Finland

Sea dune erosion at Talacre, Wales

Dune ecosystems are extremely difficult places for plants to survive. This is due to a number of pressures related to their proximity to the ocean and confinement to growth on sandy substrates. These include:

- Little available soil moisture
- Little available soil organic matter/nutrients/water
- Harsh winds
- Salt spray
- Erosion/shifting and sometimes burial or exposure (from shifting)
- Tidal influences

Plants have evolved many adaptations to cope with these pressures:

- Deep taproot to reach water table (Pink Sand Verbena)
- Shallow but extensive root systems
- Rhizomes
- Prostrate growth form to avoid wind/salt spray (Abronia spp., Beach Primrose)
- Krummholz growth form (Monterrey Cypress-not a dune plant but deals with similar pressures)
- Thickened cuticle/Succulence to reduce moisture loss and reduce salt uptake (Ambrosia/Abronia spp., Calystegia soldanella)
- Pale leaves to reduce insolation (Artemisia/Ambrosia spp.)
- Thorny/Spiky seeds to ensure establishment in vicinity of parent, reduces chances of being blown away or swept out to sea (Ambrosia chamissonis)

=== Gypsum dunes ===
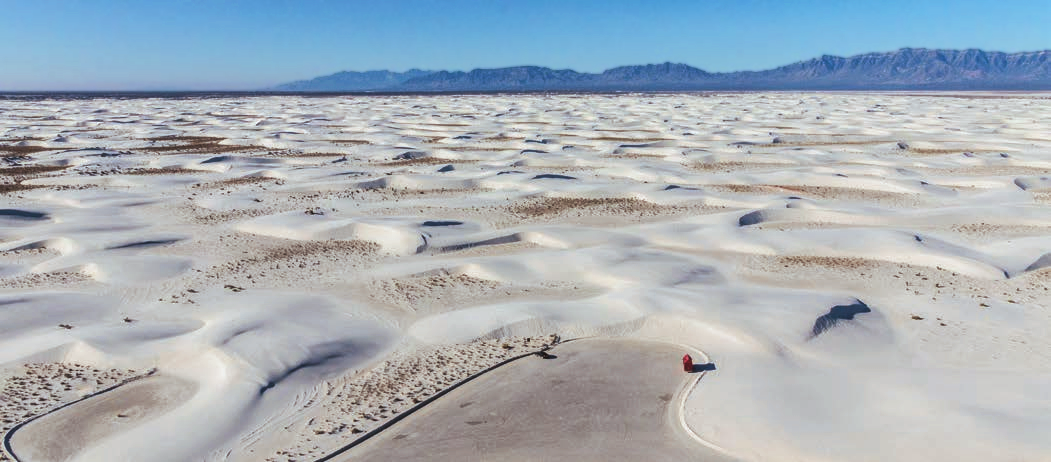
Gypsum dune fields, White Sands National Park, New Mexico, United States

In deserts where large amounts of limestone mountains surround a closed basin, such as at White Sands National Park in south-central New Mexico, occasional storm runoff transports dissolved limestone and gypsum into a low-lying pan within the basin where the water evaporates, depositing the gypsum and forming crystals known as selenite. The crystals left behind by this process are eroded by the wind and deposited as vast white dune fields that resemble snow-covered landscapes. These types of dune are rare, and only form in closed arid basins that retain the highly soluble gypsum that would otherwise be washed into the sea.

=== Nabkha dunes ===
A nabkha, or coppice dune, is a small dune anchored by vegetation. They usually indicate desertification or soil erosion, and serve as nesting and burrow sites for animals.

== Subaqueous dunes ==
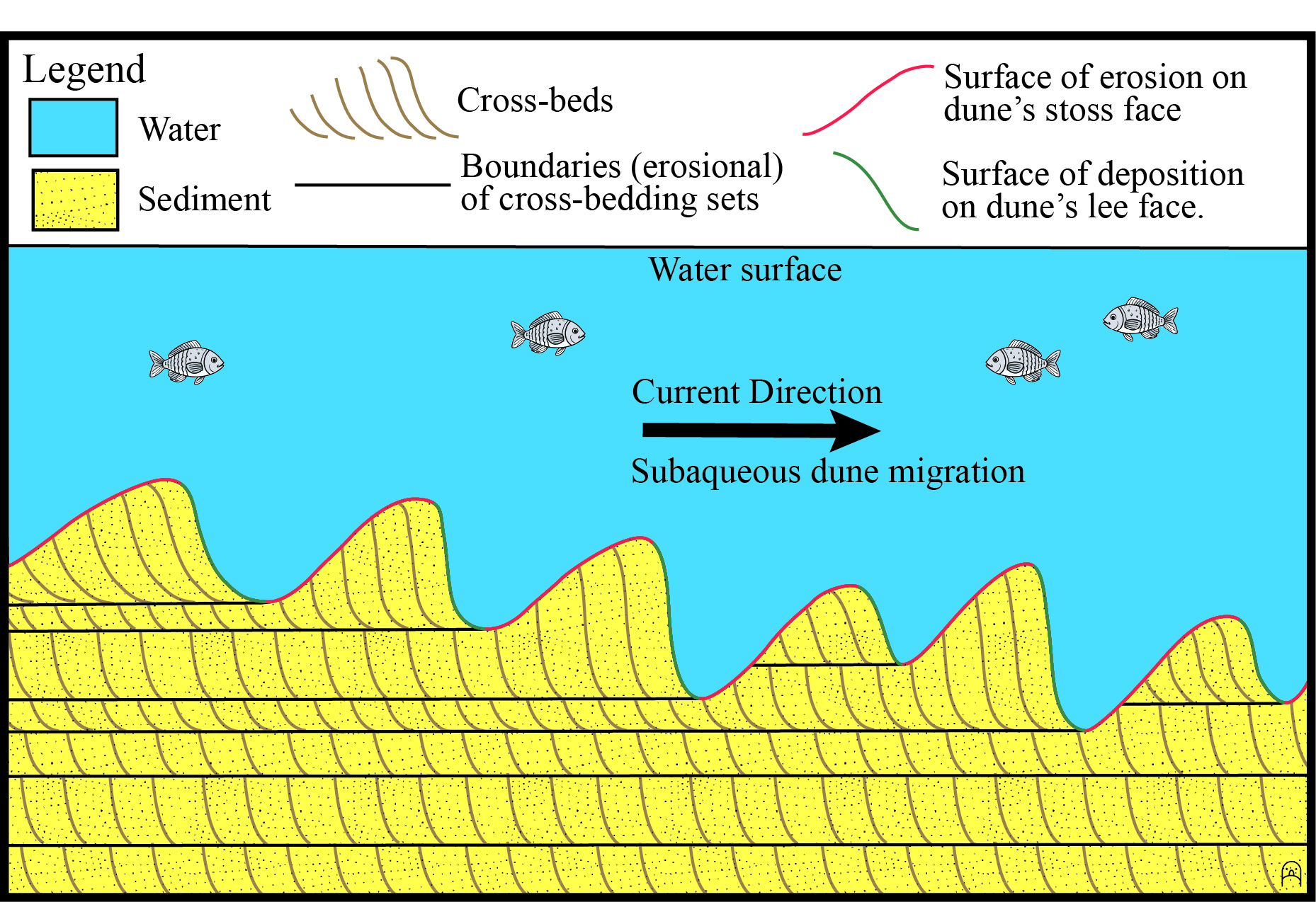
Idealized cross-section of sets of cross-bedding left behind by migrating subaqueous dunes in unidirectional current

Subaqueous (underwater) dunes form on a bed of sand or gravel under the actions of water flow. They are ubiquitous in natural channels such as rivers and estuaries, and also form in engineered canals and pipelines. Dunes move downstream as the upstream slope is eroded and the sediment deposited on the downstream or lee slope in typical bedform construction. In the case of subaqueous barchan dunes, sediment is lost by their extremities, known as horns.

These dunes most often form as a continuous 'train' of dunes, showing remarkable similarity in wavelength and height. The shape of a dune gives information about its formation environment. For instance, rivers produce asymmetrical ripples, with the steeper slip face facing downstream. Ripple marks preserved in sedimentary strata in the geological record can be used to determine the direction of current flow, and thus an indication of the source of the sediments.

Dunes on the bed of a channel significantly increase flow resistance, their presence and growth playing a major part in river flooding.

== Lithified dunes ==
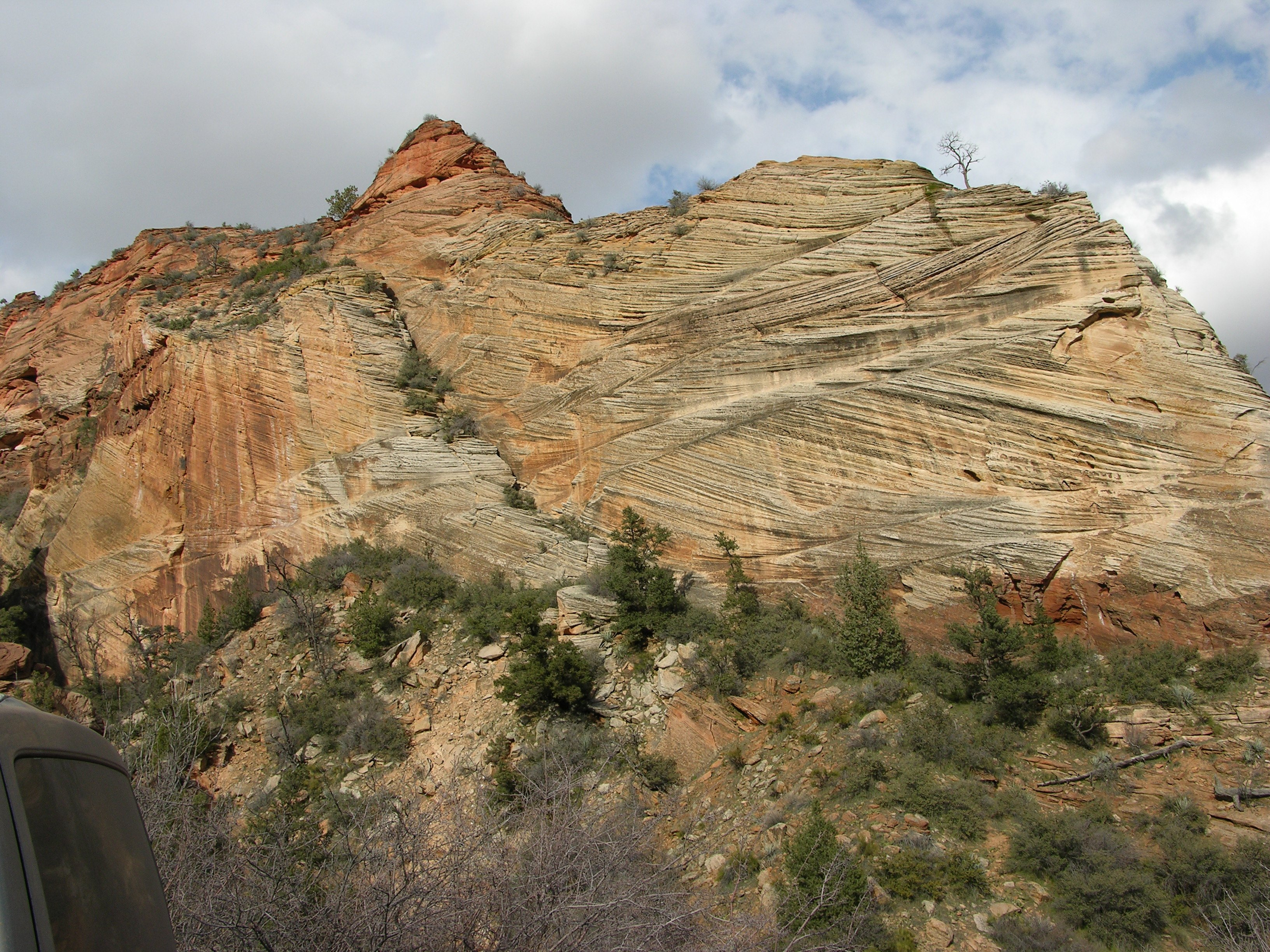
Cross-bedding in lithified aeolian sand dunes preserved as sandstone in Zion National Park, Utah

A lithified (consolidated) sand dune is a type of sandstone that is formed when a marine or aeolian sand dune becomes compacted and hardened. Once in this form, water passing through the rock can carry and deposit minerals, which can alter the colour of the rock. Cross-bedded layers of stacks of lithified dunes can produce the cross-hatching patterns, such as those seen in Zion National Park in the western United States.

A slang term, used in the southwest US, for consolidated and hardened sand dunes is "slickrock", a name that was introduced by pioneers of the Old West because their steel-rimmed wagon wheels could not gain traction on the rock.

== Desertification ==
Sand dunes can have a negative impact on humans when they encroach on human habitats. Sand dunes move via a few different means, all of them helped along by wind. One way that dunes can move is by saltation, where sand particles skip along the ground like a bouncing ball. When these skipping particles land, they may knock into other particles and cause them to move as well, in a process known as creep. With slightly stronger winds, particles collide in mid-air, causing sheet flows. In a major dust storm, dunes may move tens of metres through such sheet flows. Also as in the case of snow, sand avalanches, falling down the slipface of the dunes—that face away from the winds—also move the dunes forward.

Sand threatens buildings and crops in Africa, the Middle East, and China. Drenching sand dunes with oil stops their migration, but this approach uses a valuable resource and is quite destructive to the dunes' animal habitats. Sand fences might also slow their movement to a crawl, but geologists are still analysing results for the optimum fence designs. Preventing sand dunes from overwhelming towns, villages, and agricultural areas has become a priority for the United Nations Environment Programme. Planting dunes with vegetation also helps to stabilise them.

== Conservation ==
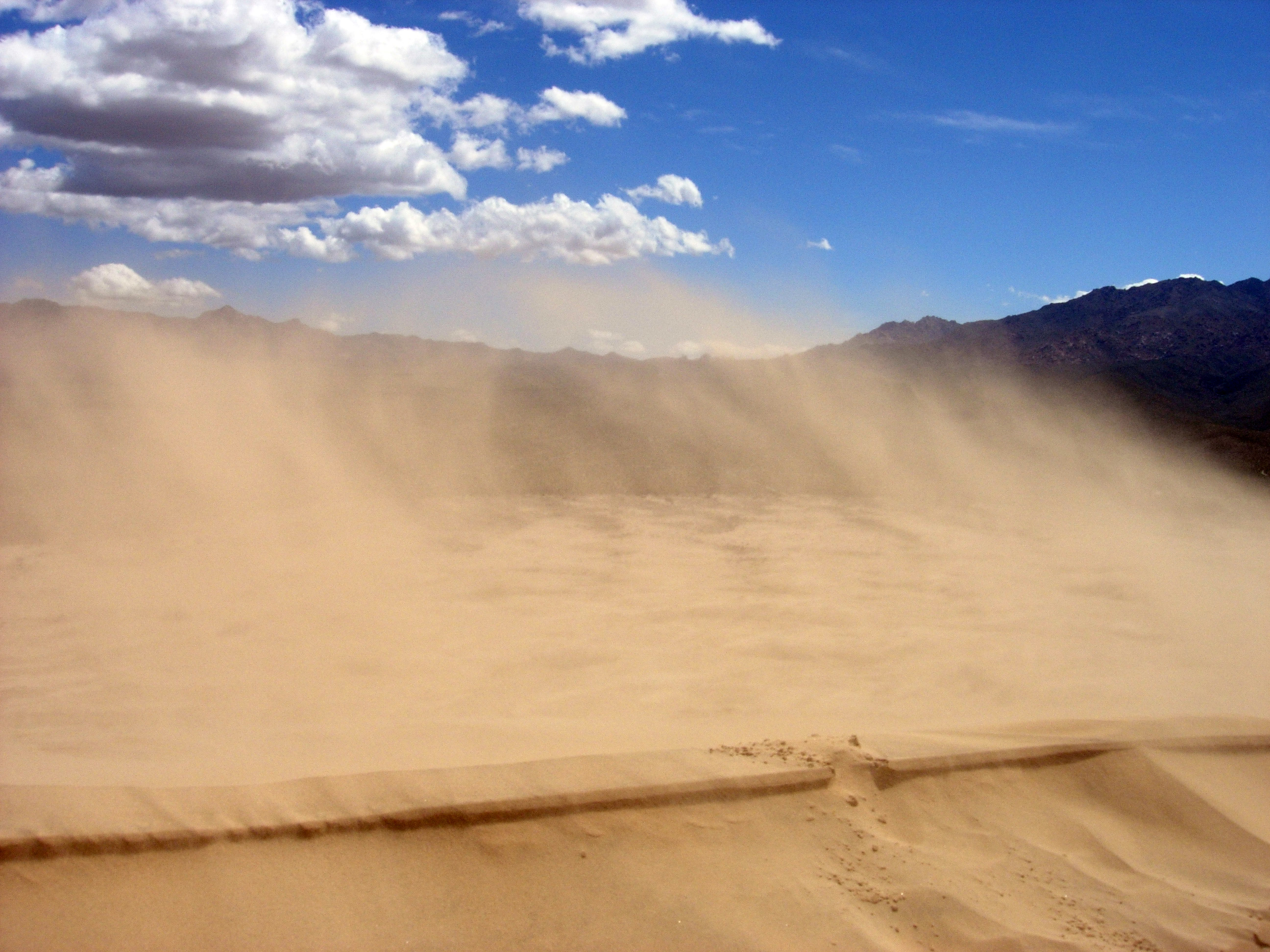
Sand blowing off a crest in the Kelso Dunes of the Mojave Desert, California, USA

Dune habitats provide niches for highly specialized plants and animals, including numerous rare species and some endangered species. Due to widespread human population expansion, dunes face destruction through land development and recreational usages, as well as alteration to prevent the encroachment of sand onto inhabited areas. Some countries, notably the United States, Australia, Canada, New Zealand, the United Kingdom, Netherlands, and Sri Lanka have developed significant programs of dune protection through the use of sand dune stabilization. In the U.K., a Biodiversity Action Plan has been developed to assess dunes loss and to prevent future dunes destruction.

== Examples ==
=== Africa ===
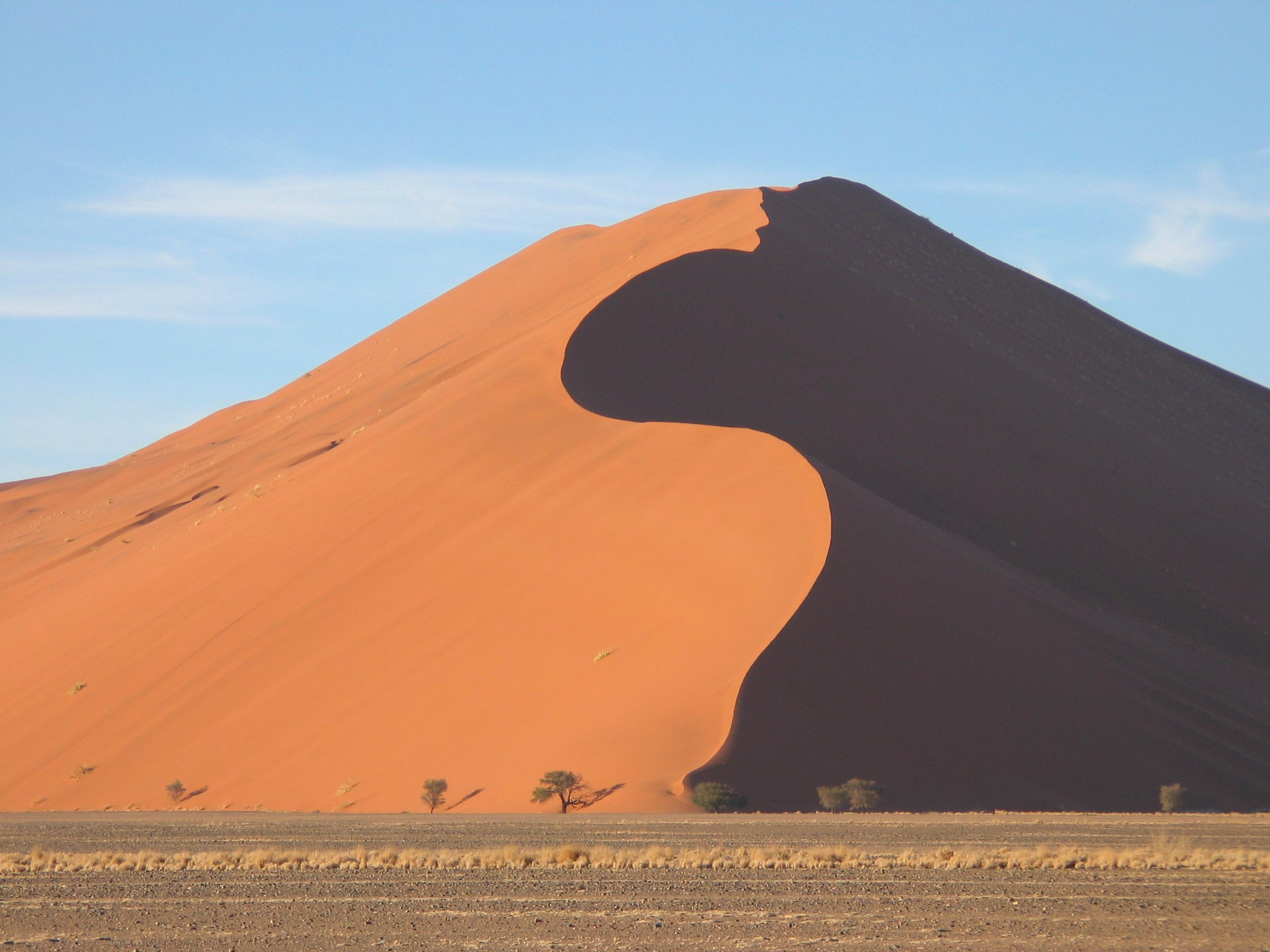
A dune in Sossusvlei, in the greater Namib-Naukluft National Park, Namibia. Note the trees being engulfed for scale.

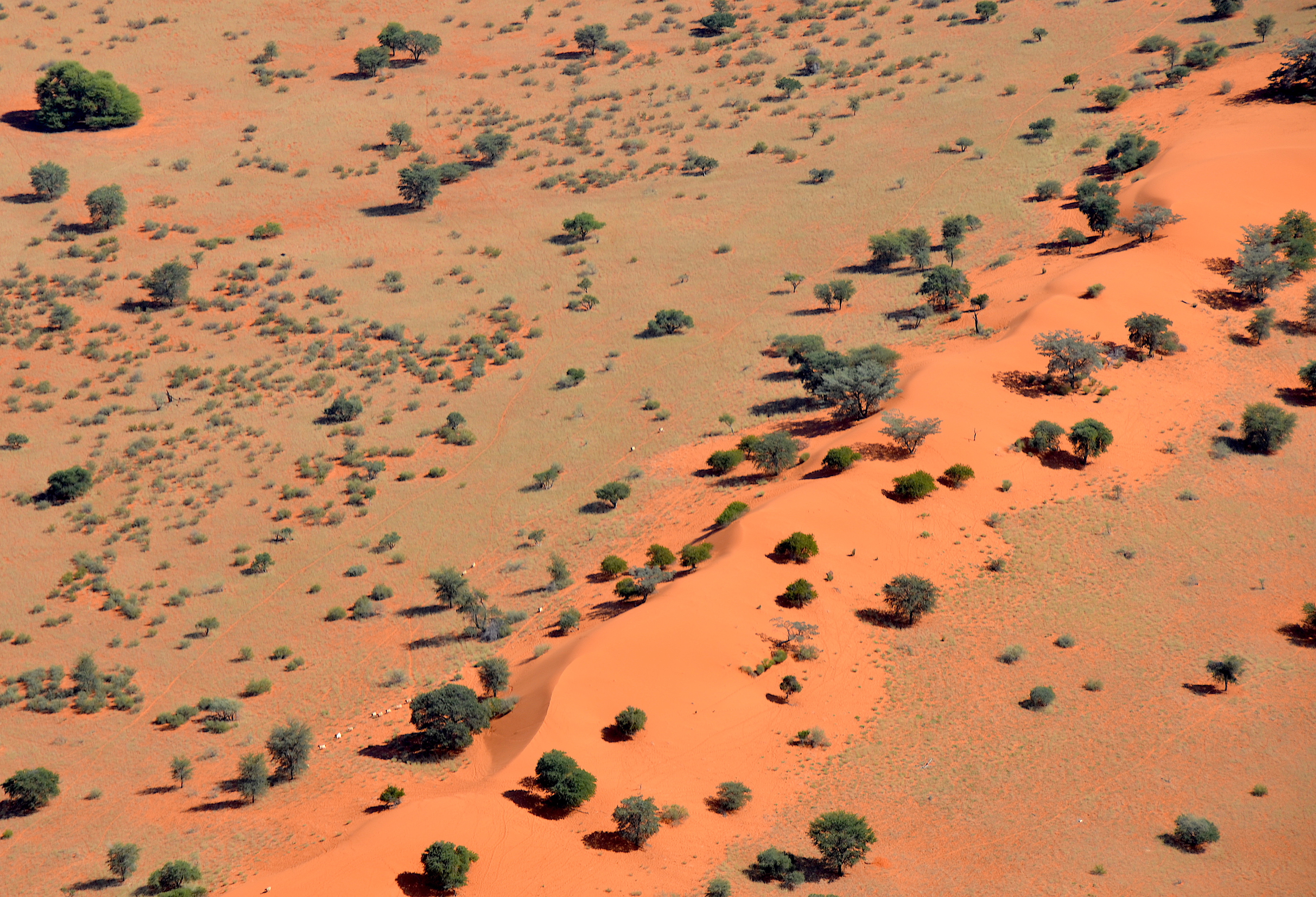
Camelthorn trees and bushes scattered on dunes in the Kalahari Desert in Namibia (2017)

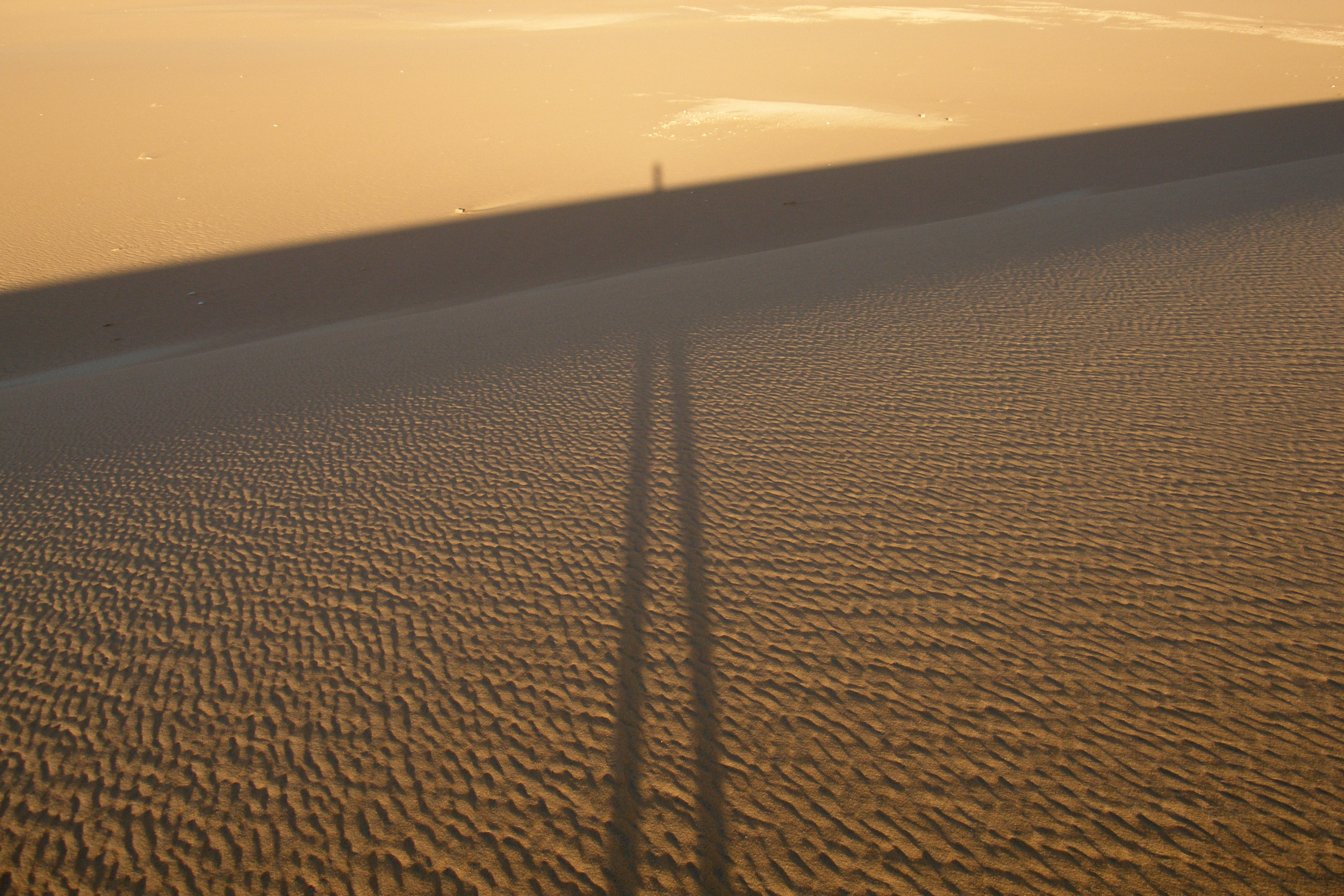
Sand dune in the Libyan Desert near Dakhla Oasis at sunset.

- Alexandria Coastal Dunefields, in the Eastern Cape, South Africa
- Witsand Nature Reserve in the Kalahari Desert, South Africa
- The white dunes of De Hoop Nature Reserve, South Africa
- The dunes of the Suguta Valley, a desert part of the Great Rift Valley in northwestern Kenya
- The dunes of the Danakil Depression, northeastern Ethiopia toward the border with Eritrea
- The dunes of Sossusvlei in the greater Namib-Naukluft National Park, Namibia
- Chad Basin National Park in northern Nigeria
- The coastal dunes of Iona National Park in the southwesternmost part of Angola
- Khawa dunes in the Kgalagadi Transfrontier Park, the southwesternmost part of Botswana
- La Dune Rose in the city of Gao in northern Mali near the Niger River
- Erg Aoukar in southeastern Mauritania extending into Mali
- Erg Chech in southwestern Algeria and northern Mali
- Erg Chebbi and Erg Chigaga in southern Morocco
- Grand Erg Oriental in northeastern Algeria and southern Tunisia
- Grand Erg Occidental in western Algeria
- The Idehan Ubari and the Idehan Murzuq in southwestern Libya
- The Corralejo dunes in the Canary Islands, Spain
- The Rebiana Sand Sea in southeastern Libya
- The Great Sand Sea in southeastern Libya and southwestern Egypt
- The Selima Sand Sheet in northwestern Sudan
- The dunes of the Bayuda Desert in northern Sudan
- The dunes of the Lompoul Desert in northwestern Senegal
- The coastal dunes of Bazaruto Island, Mozambique
- Erg du Djourab in northern Chad
- The dunes of the Mourdi Depression in northeastern Chad
- The dunes of Tin Toumma Desert, in southeastern Niger
- Grand Erg de Bilma in the Ténéré, in northern Niger
- The dunes of Oursi in the Sahel Region, northern Burkina Faso
- Tanzania's "shifting sands" near Olduvai Gorge

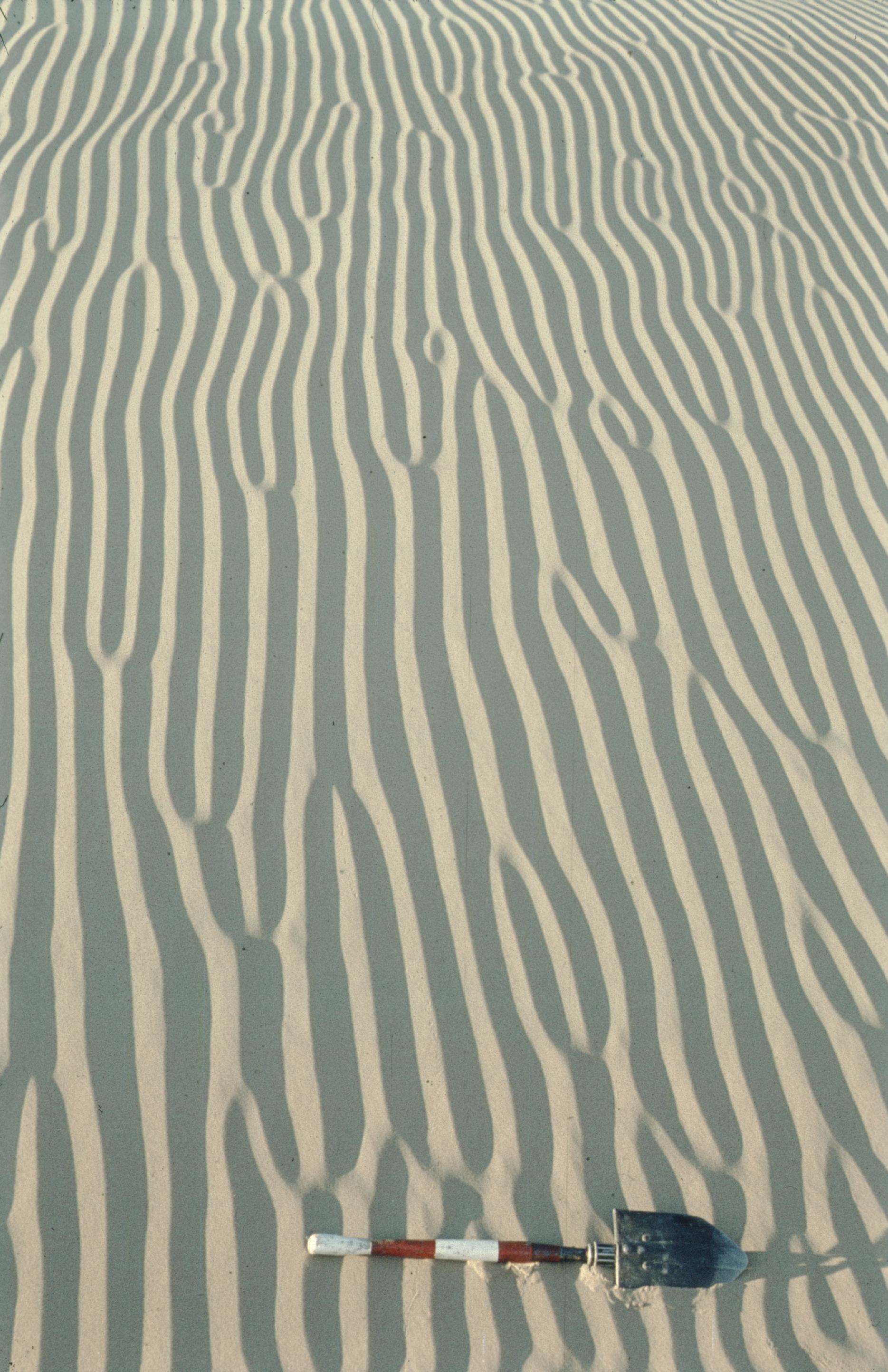
Wind ripples on crescent-shaped sand dunes (barchans) in southwest Afghanistan (Sistan)

=== Asia ===
- Sunset view dunes in the Alankuda village on Kalpitiya peninsula in Sri Lanka.
- The dunes in the Thar Desert in India and Pakistan
- Tottori Sand Dunes, Tottori Prefecture, Japan
- Chara Sands, Zabaykalsky Krai, Russia
- Rig-e Jenn in the Central Desert of Iran.
- Rig-e Lut in the Southeast of Iran.
- The Ilocos Norte Sand Dunes in the Philippines, particularly Paoay Sand Dunes.
- Moreeb Dune in Liwa Oasis, United Arab Emirates, used as an arena for drag motor sports and Sandboarding.
- Gumuk Pasir Parangkusumo near Parangtritis beach in Yogyakarta, Indonesia.
- Lautan Pasir, a volcanic dune in Bromo Tengger Semeru National Park, Indonesia.
- Mui Ne, Vietnam.
- Sharqiya Sands, Oman
- Teri, red dune complex in southern India
- The dunes of the Taklamakan Desert in southwest Xinjiang in Northwest China
- Tukulans of the Central Yakutian Lowland, Russia

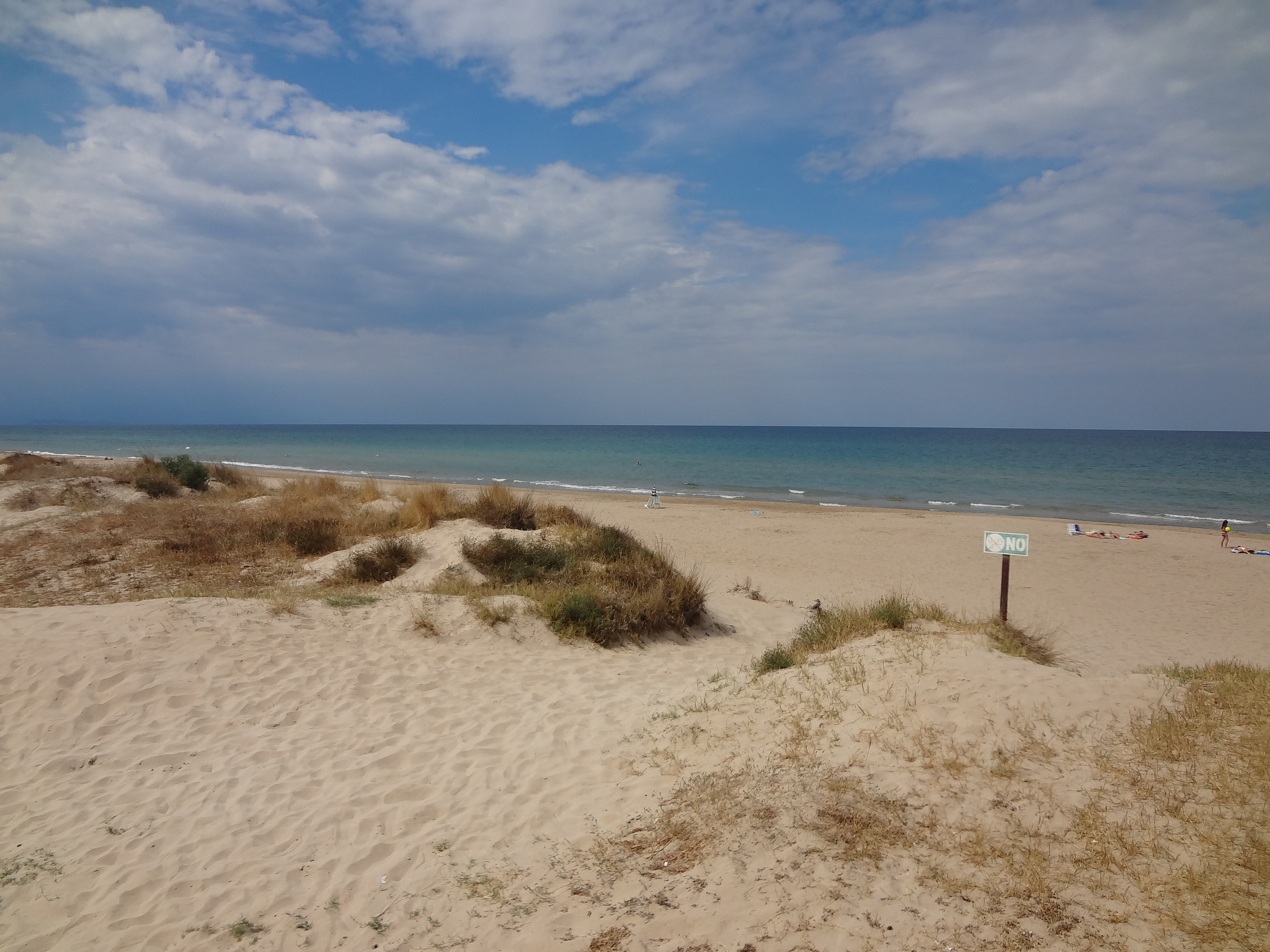
Fronting the Mediterranean Sea in Oliva, Valencian Community, Spain

=== Europe ===
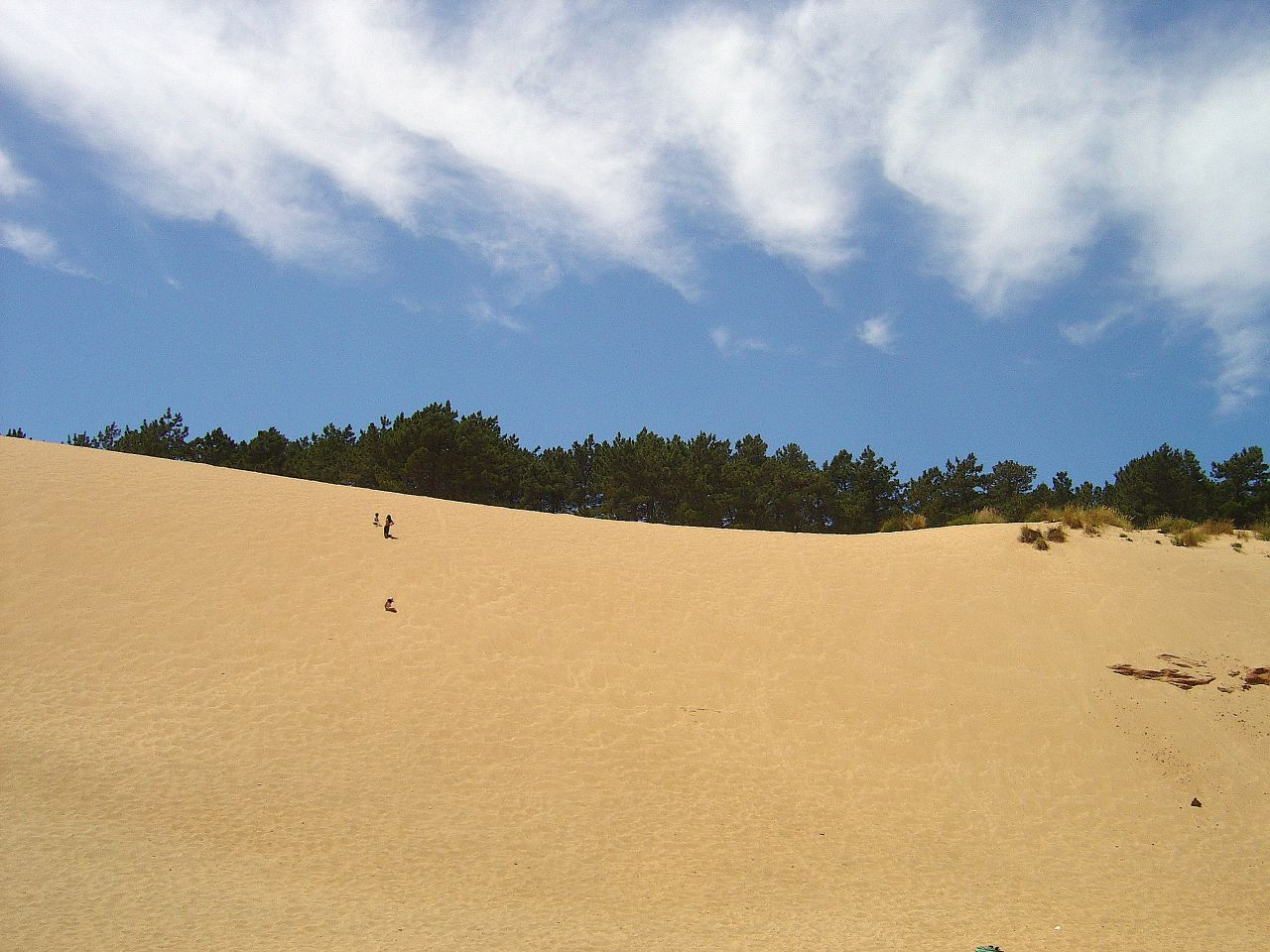
50 m (160 ft) tall dune in Salir do Porto, Portugal

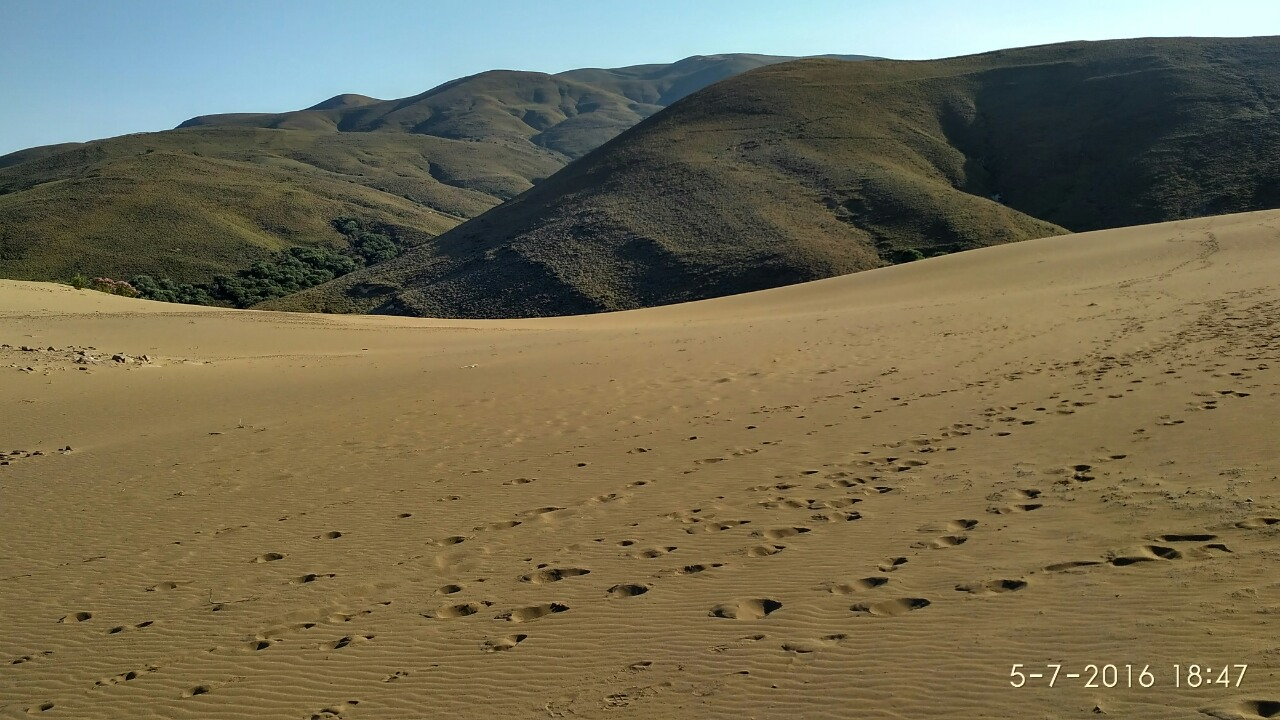
Sand dunes of Lemnos, Greece

- The Dunes of Dyuni, near Pomorie, Bulgaria, vast area of sand dunes in the Burgas Province
- The Dune of Pilat, not far from Bordeaux, France, is the largest known sand dune in Europe
- The Dunes of Piscinas, in the south west of Sardinia island.
- Sands of Forvie within the Ythan Estuary complex, Aberdeenshire, Scotland.
- Oxwich Dunes, near Swansea, is on the Gower Peninsula in Wales.
- Winterton Dunes – Norfolk, England
- Słowiński National Park, Poland
- Siedlec Desert, Poland
- Starczynów Desert, now mostly forested dunes, Poland
- Sand dunes of Lemnos, Lesbos Prefecture, Greece
- Akrotiri Sand Dune, Lemesos, Cyprus
- Råbjerg mile, Northern Jutland, Denmark
- Thy National Park, North Denmark Region, Denmark
- Dunes of Corrubedo, Spain
- Cresmina Dune, Portugal
- Northern Littoral Natural Park, Portugal
- Dune of Salir, Portugal
- São Jacinto Dunes Natural Reserve, Portugal
- Rëra e Hedhur in Shëngjin, Albania
- De Hoge Veluwe National Park, Veluwe, Netherlands
- Kootwijkerzand, Veluwe, Netherlands, 7 km^{2}
- Dunes of Texel National Park, Texel, Netherlands
- Zuid-Kennemerland National Park, North Holland, Netherlands
- Berkheide, Netherlands
- Ammothines Lemnou, Lemnos, Greece
- Dunes of the Curonian Spit, Lithuania and Russia
  - Parnidis Dune, Vecekrugas Dune - Curonian Spit, Lithuania
- Oleshky Sands, Ukraine
- Ullahau, Sweden, Big Parabel Dune and dune system

=== North America ===
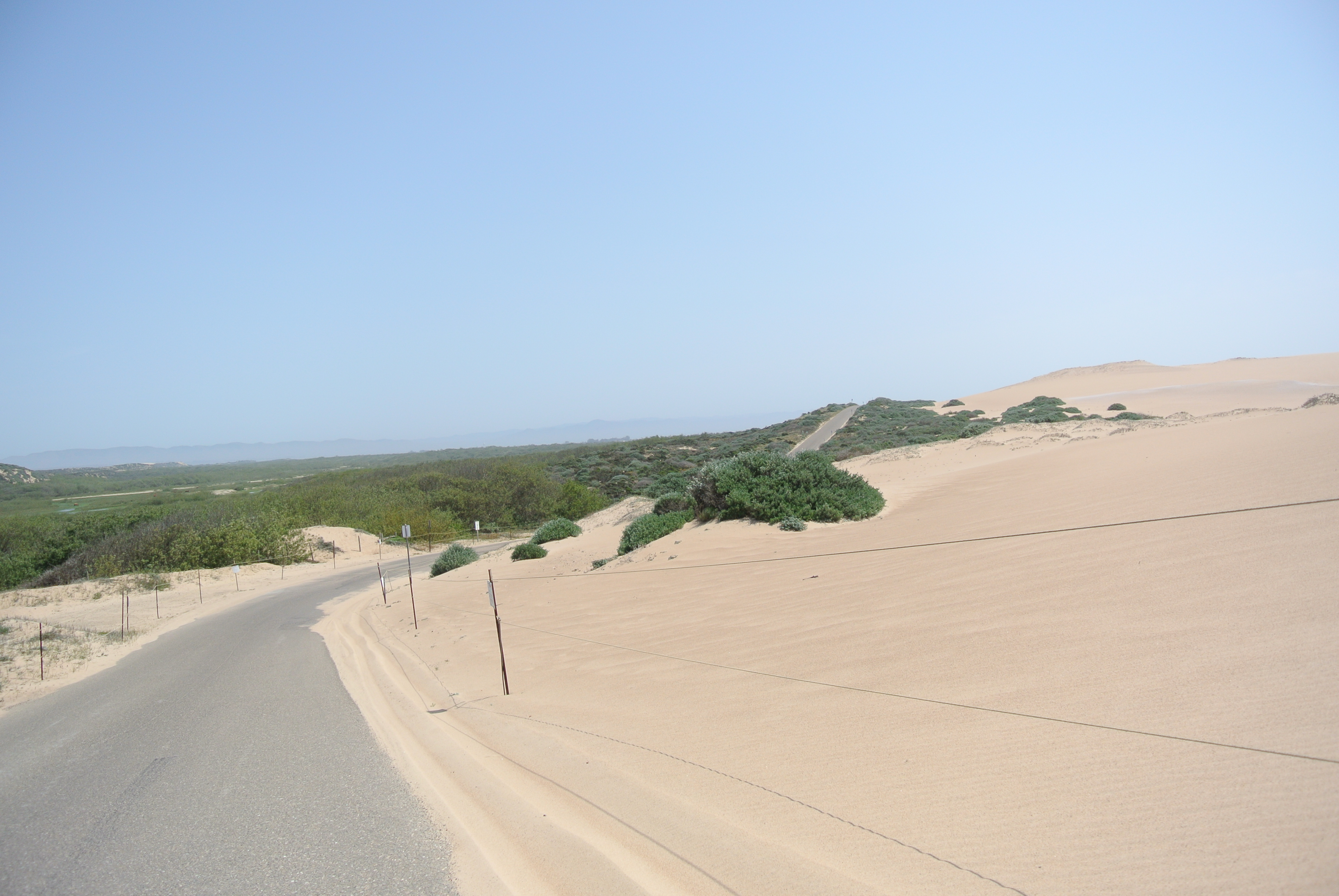
Guadalupe-Nipomo Dunes

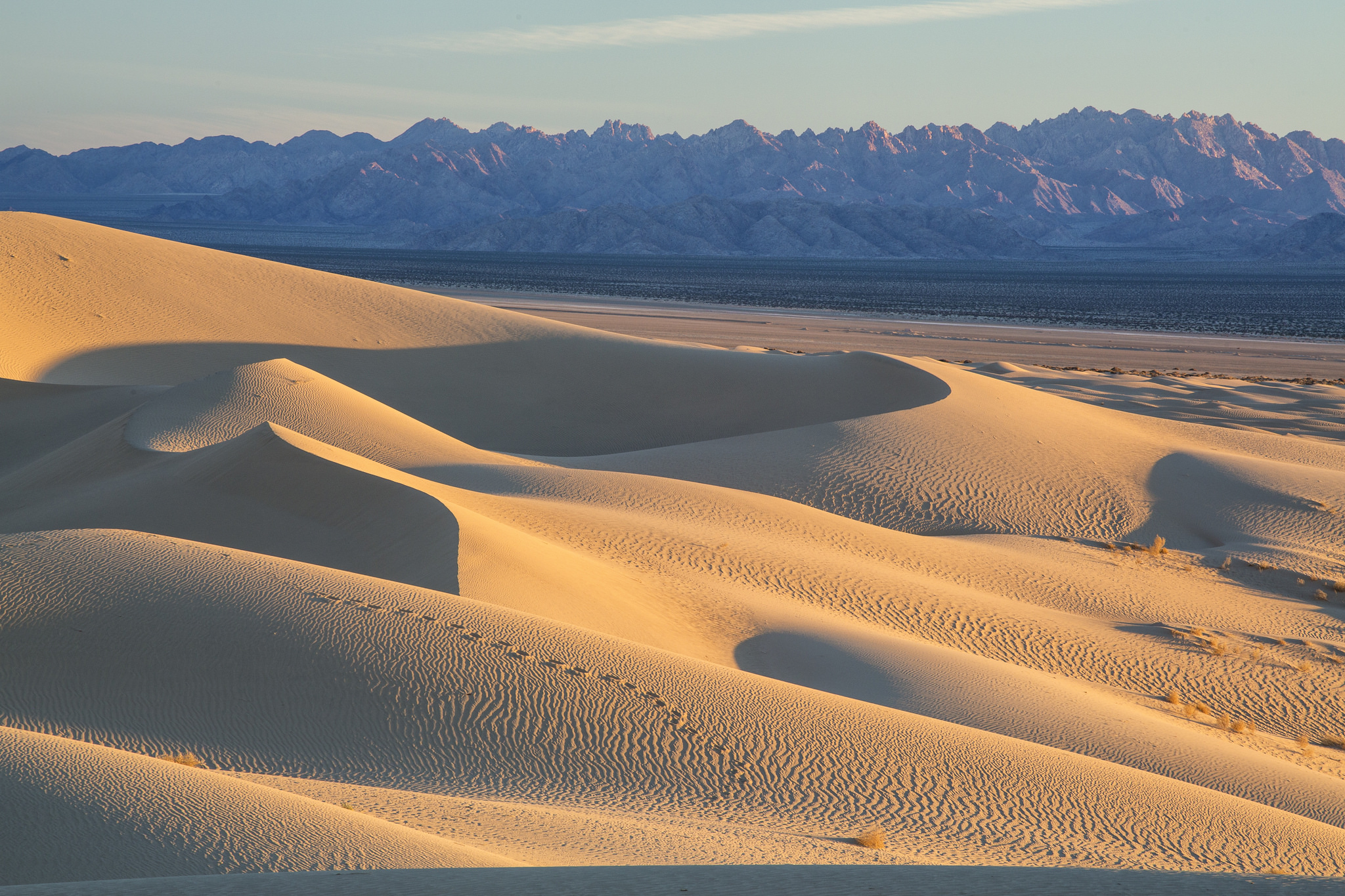
Cadiz Dunes Wilderness, California

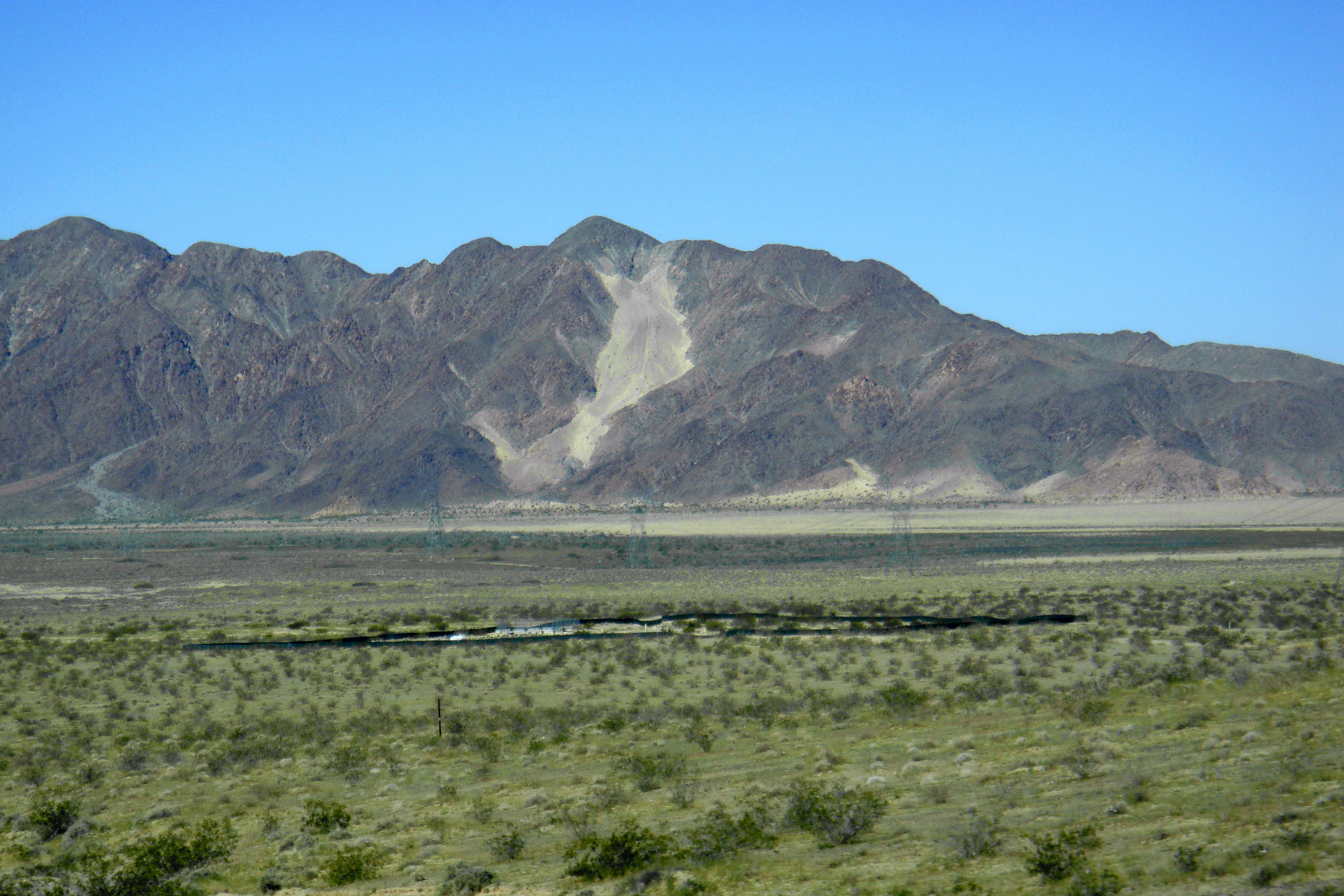
Cat Dune, Cronese Mountains, California

==== Canada ====
- Victoria Island Sand Dunes,160 km North West of Cambridge Bay, Nunavut, Canada. Approximately 600 square kilometres, the largest in Canada, third largest in North America and the largest in the Arctic. There are two lakes with direct access to the Dunes from float planes.
- The Athabasca Sand Dunes, located in the Athabasca Sand Dunes Provincial Park, Saskatchewan.
- Carcross Desert near Carcross, Yukon

==== United States ====
- Alaska:
  - Nogahabara Sand Dunes in western Alaska.
  - Great Kobuk Sand Dunes, Kobuk Valley National Park, Alaska
- California:
  - The Cadiz Dunes, in the Mojave Trails National Monument in California.
  - The Kelso Dunes in the Mojave Desert of California.
  - Eureka Valley Sand Dunes and Mesquite Flat Sand Dunes in Death Valley National Park, California.
  - Algodones Dunes near Brawley, California.
  - Guadalupe-Nipomo Dunes, on the central coast of California.
  - Cat Dune in the Cronese Mountains is a rare type of dune called a sand ramp.
- Great Sand Dunes National Park, Colorado.
- The Great Dune found in Cape Henlopen State Park in Lewes, Delaware.
- Bruneau Dunes State Park – Owyhee Desert, Idaho
- Indiana Dunes National Park, Indiana, on the south shore of Lake Michigan.
- Herring Cove, Race Point and The Province Lands bicycle path in Provincetown, Massachusetts as part of the US National Park Service of the Cape Cod National Seashore.
- Michigan:
  - Sleeping Bear Dunes National Lakeshore, Michigan, on the east shore of Lake Michigan.
  - Warren Dunes State Park, Michigan, on the east shore of Lake Michigan.
  - Grand Sable Dunes, in the Pictured Rocks National Lakeshore, Michigan.
  - Hoffmaster State Park – Muskegon, Michigan
  - Silver Lake State Park — a sand dunes that allows off-road vehicle use located near Mears, Michigan.
- Grey Cloud Dunes- Minnesota
- White Sands National Park, New Mexico.
- Jockey's Ridge State Park – on the Outer Banks, North Carolina.
- Beaver Dunes State Park near Beaver, Oklahoma.
- Oregon Dunes National Recreation Area near Florence, Oregon, on the Pacific Coast.
- Monahans Sandhills State Park near Odessa, Texas.
- Little Sahara Recreation Area, Utah.
- The Killpecker sand dunes of the Red Desert in southwestern Wyoming.

==== Mexico ====
- Samalayuca Dunes, in the state of Chihuahua, Mexico

=== South America ===
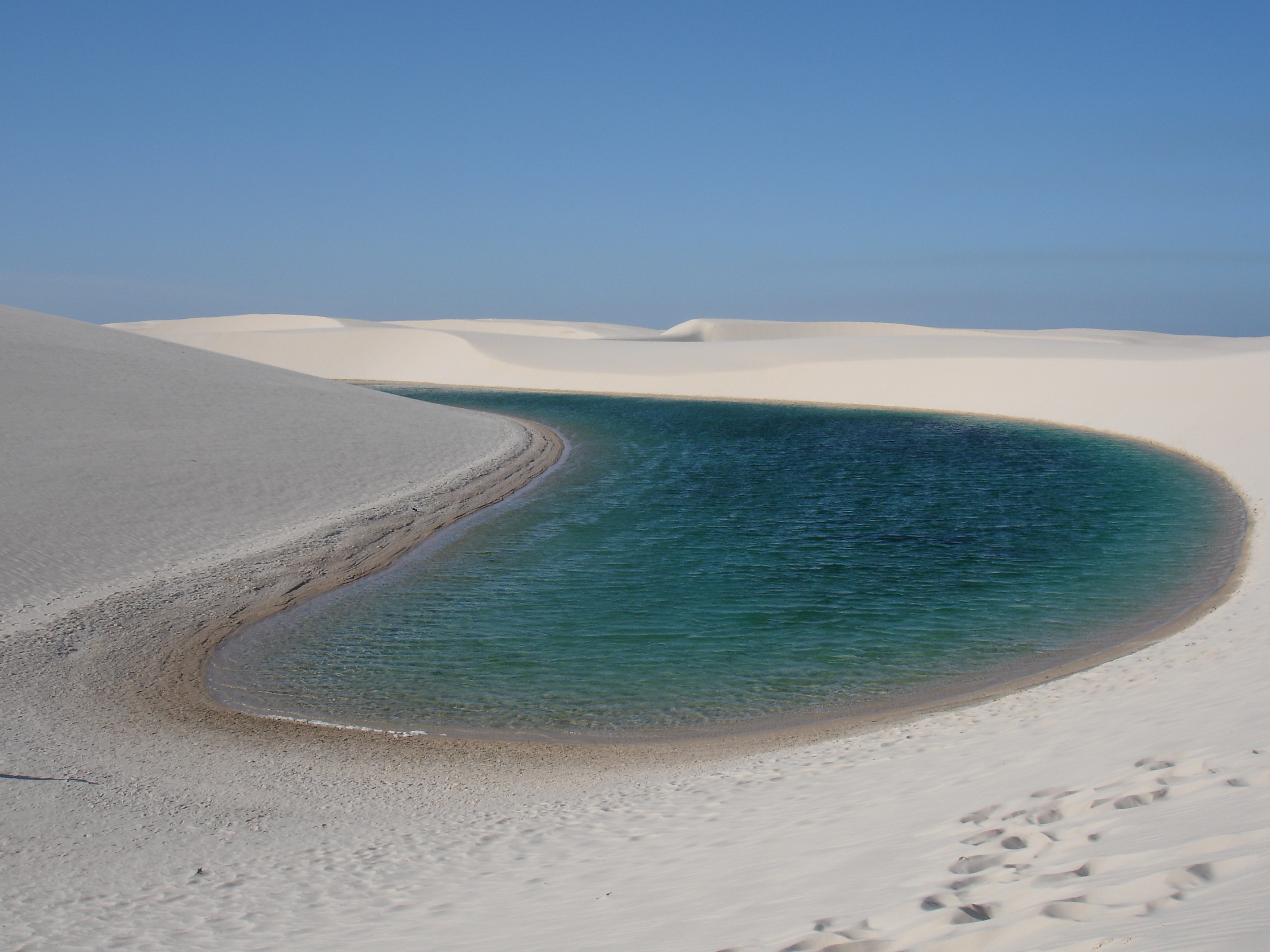
White sand dunes in the Lençóis Maranhenses National Park, Maranhão, Brazil

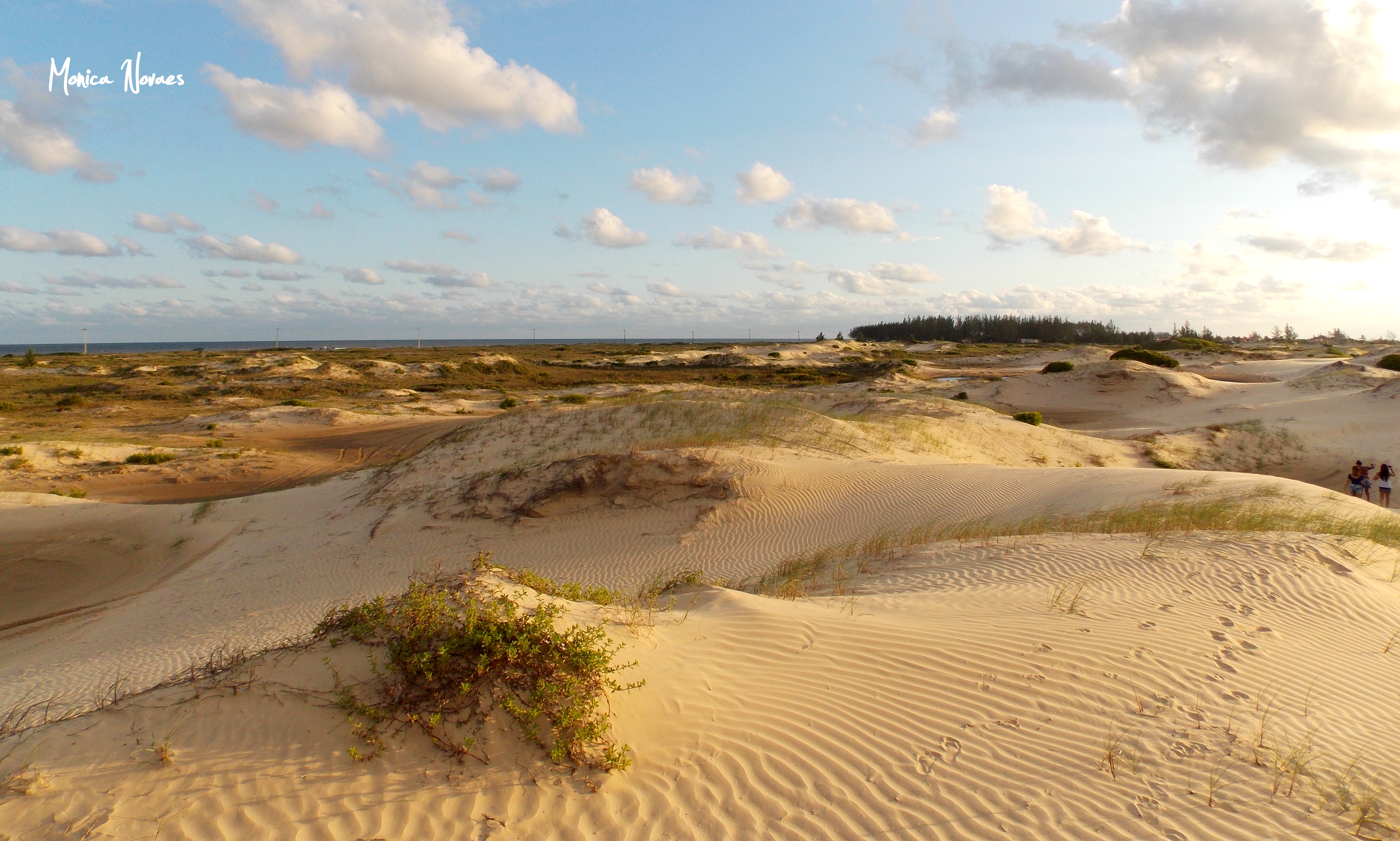
Araça Dunes, in Ilha Comprida Environmental Protection Area, São Paulo, Brazil

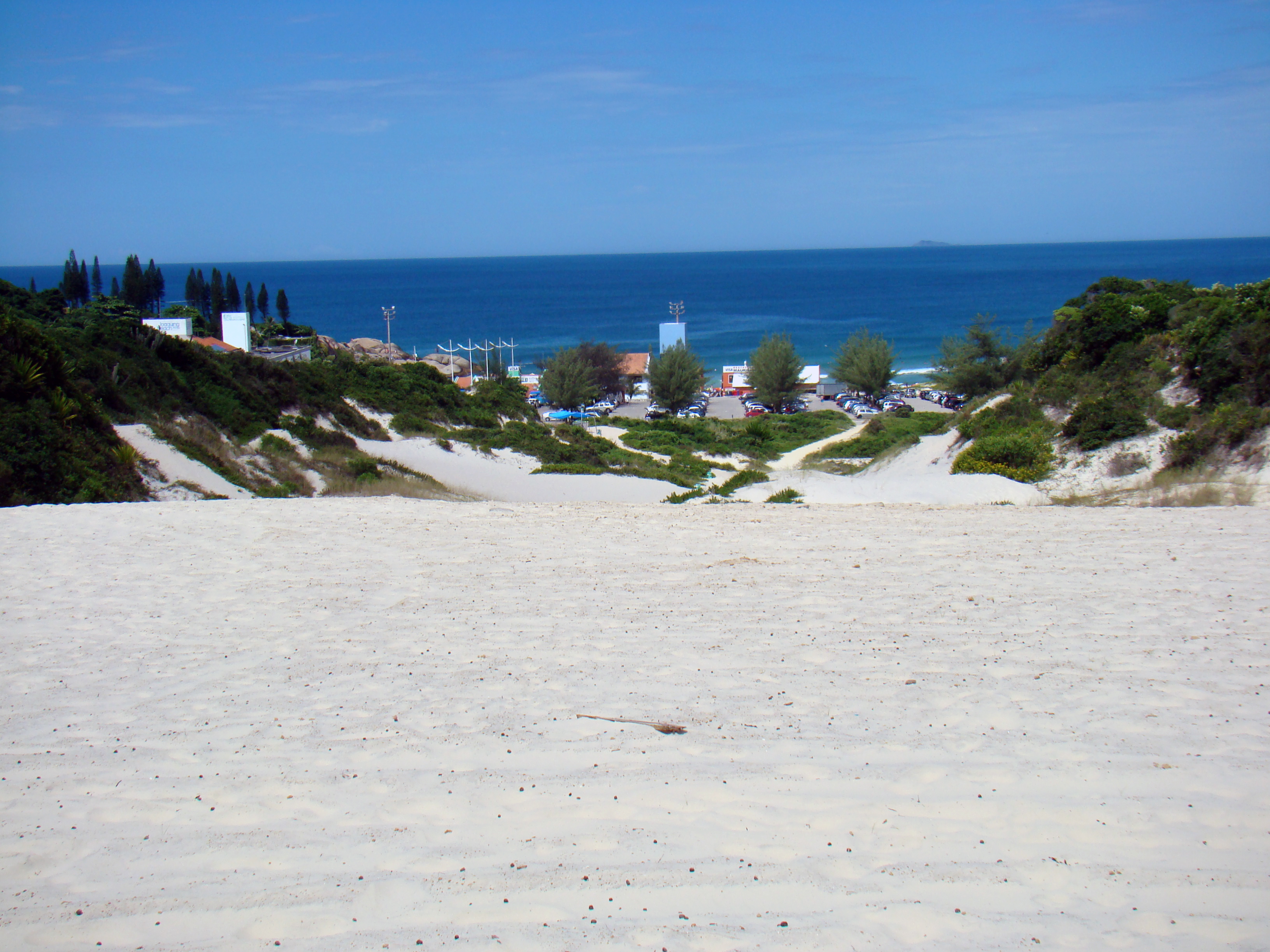
Joaquina Beach, Santa Catarina

- Argentina:
  - Duna Federico Kirbus in Catamarca Province, Argentina
  - Villa Gesell in Buenos Aires Province, Argentina
- Brazil:
  - Lençóis Maranhenses National Park in the state of Maranhão, Brazil
  - Ilha Comprida Environmental Protection Area in the state of São Paulo, Brazil
  - Joaquina Beach Dunes in Florianópolis, in the state of Santa Catarina, Brazil
  - Jericoacoara National Park, in the state of Ceará, Brazil
  - Genipabu in Natal, Brazil
- Chile:
  - Cerro Medanoso in Atacama Region, Chile
  - Colún Beach, Valdivian Coastal Reserve in Chile
  - Dunas de Concón, Chile
  - Cerro Dragón (Chile), urban dune in Iquique, Chile
- Peru:
  - Cerro Blanco in Nazca Province, Peru
  - Huacachina in Ica Region, Peru
- Venezuela: Medanos de Coro National Park near the town of Coro, in Falcón State, Venezuela

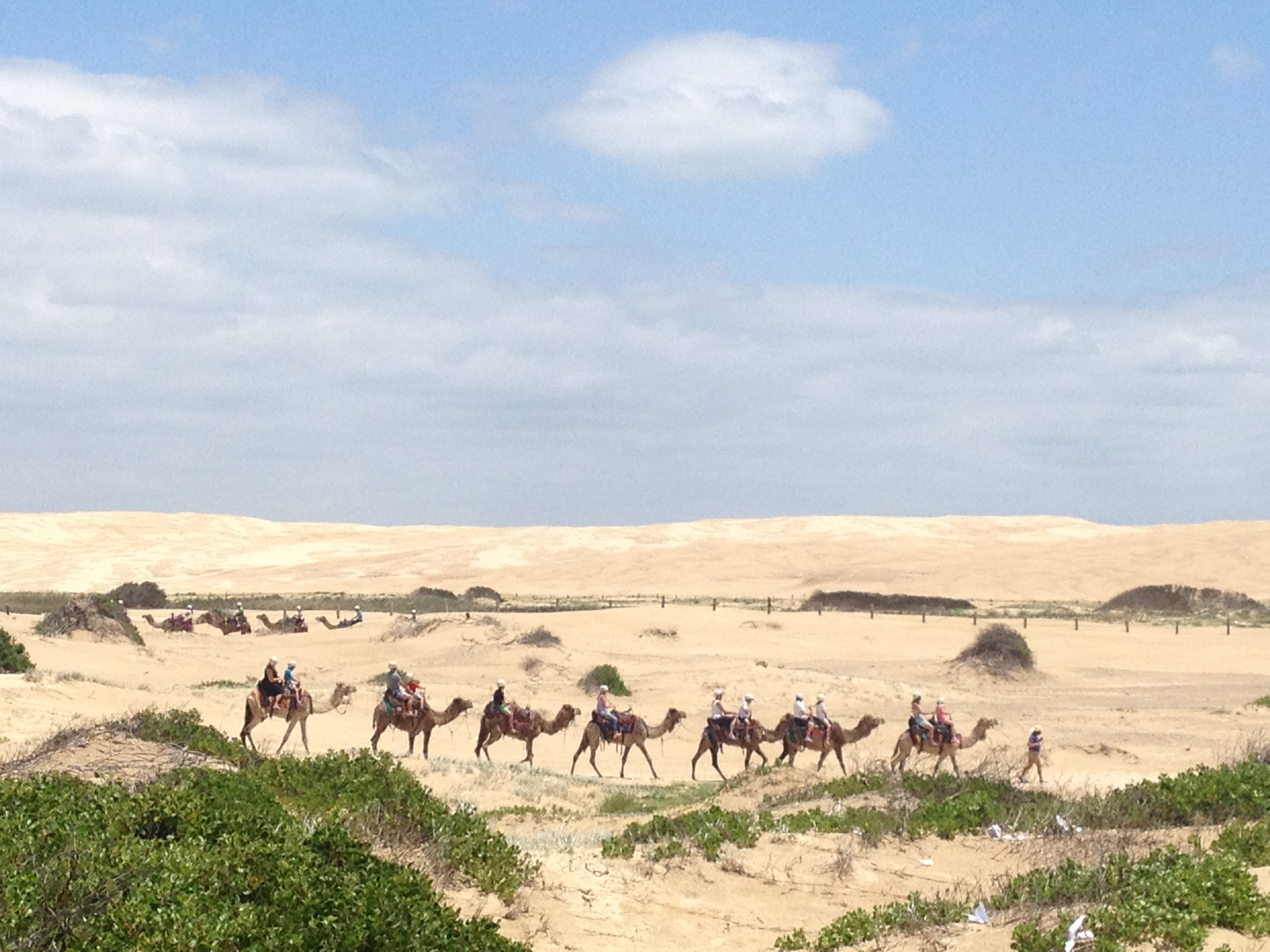
Coastal dunes at Stockton Beach in the City of Newcastle

=== Oceania ===
- Simpson Desert sand dunes in the Northern Territory, Queensland and South Australia, Australia
- Coorong National Park in South Australia
- Lincoln National Park in South Australia
- Coffin Bay National Park in South Australia
- Fraser Island in Queensland, Australia
- Cronulla sand dunes in New South Wales, Australia
- Stockton Beach in New South Wales, Australia
- Lancelin sand dunes in Western Australia, Australia
- Te Paki sand dunes near Cape Reinga, New Zealand

=== World's highest dunes ===
Note: This table is partially based on estimates and incomplete information.
Dune	Height from base metres (feet)	Height from sea level metres (feet)	Location	Notes
Duna Federico Kirbus	≈1,230 m (4,040 ft)	≈2,845 m (9,334 ft)	Bolsón de Fiambalá, Fiambalá, Catamarca Province, Argentina	Highest in the world
Cerro Blanco	≈1,176 m (3,858 ft)	≈2,080 m (6,820 ft)	Nazca Province, Ica Region, Peru 14.868°S 74.838°W	Highest in Peru, second highest in the world
Badain Jaran Dunes	≈500 m (1,600 ft)	≈2,020 m (6,630 ft)	Badain Jaran Desert, Alashan Plain, Inner Mongolia, Gobi Desert, China	World's tallest stationary dunes and highest in Asia
Rig-e Yalan Dune	≈470 m (1,540 ft)	≈950 m (3,120 ft)	Lut Desert, Kerman, Iran	Hottest place on Earth (Gandom Beryan)
Draa Dune	420 m (1,380 ft)	≈870 m (2,850 ft)	Erg Tiffernine, Algerian Sahara	Highest in Africa
Big Daddy/Dune 7 (Big Mama?)	383 m (1,257 ft)	≈570 m (1,870 ft)	Sossusvlei Dunes, Namib Desert, Namibia / Near Walvis Bay Namib Desert, Namibia	according to the Namibian Ministry of Environment & Tourism the highest dune in the world
Mount Tempest	≈280 m (920 ft)	≈280 m (920 ft)	Moreton Island, Brisbane, Australia	Highest in Australia
Star Dune	>230 m (750 ft)	≈2,730 m (8,960 ft)	Great Sand Dunes National Park and Preserve, Colorado, USA	Highest in North America
Dune of Pilat	≈105 m (344 ft)	≈130 m (430 ft)	Bay of Arcachon, Aquitaine, France	Highest in Europe
Ming-Sha Dunes	?	1,725 m (5,659 ft)	Dunhuang Oasis, Taklamakan Desert, Gansu, China	
Medanoso Dune	≈550 m (1,800 ft)	≈1,660 m (5,450 ft)	Atacama Desert, Chile	Highest in Chile

=== Sand dune systems ===
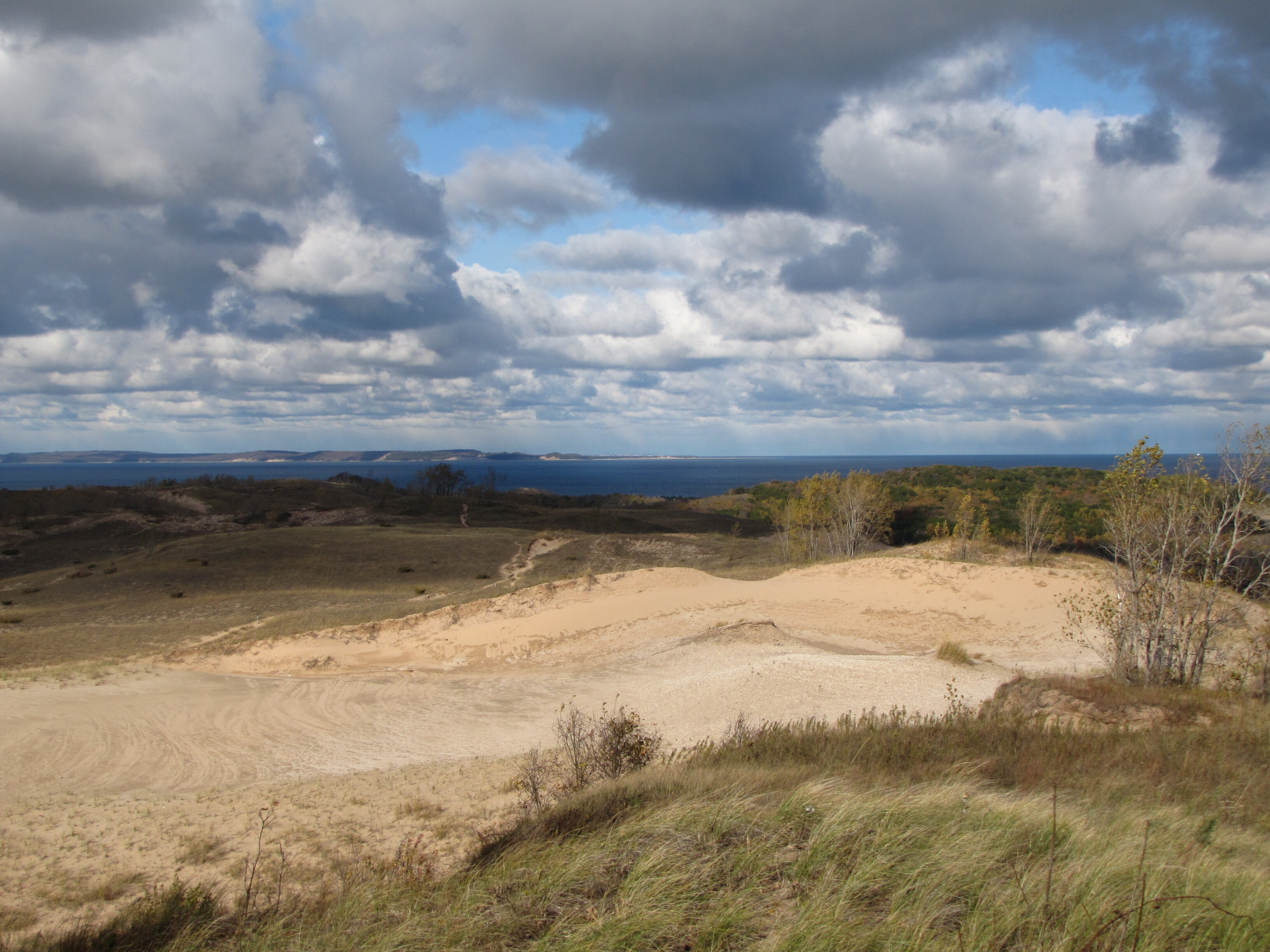
Sleeping Bear Dunes in Michigan

(coastal dunes featuring succession)

- Athabasca Sand Dunes Provincial Park, Alberta and Saskatchewan
- Ashdod Sand Dune, Israel
- Bamburgh Dunes, Northumberland, England
- Bradley Beach, New Jersey
- Circeo National Park, a Mediterranean dune area on the southwest coast of the Lazio region of Italy
- Cronulla sand dunes, NSW, Australia
- Crymlyn Burrows, Wales
- Dawlish Warren, Devon, England
- Fraser Island, Queensland Australia, largest sand island in the world
- Indiana Dunes National Park, Indiana
- Kenfig Burrows, Wales
- Margam burrows, Wales
- Murlough Sand Dunes, Newcastle, Co Down, Northern Ireland
- Morfa Harlech sand dunes, Gwynedd, Wales
- Newborough Warren, North Wales
- Oregon Dunes National Recreation Area, near North Bend, Oregon
- Penhale Sands, Cornwall, England
- Sleeping Bear Dunes National Lakeshore, Michigan
- Sandy Island Beach State Park, Richland, New York
- Studland, Dorset, England
- Thy National Park, North Denmark Region, Denmark
- Winterton, Norfolk, England
- Woolacombe, Devon, England
- Braunton Burrows, Devon, England
- Ynyslas Sand Dunes, Wales

=== Extraterrestrial dunes ===
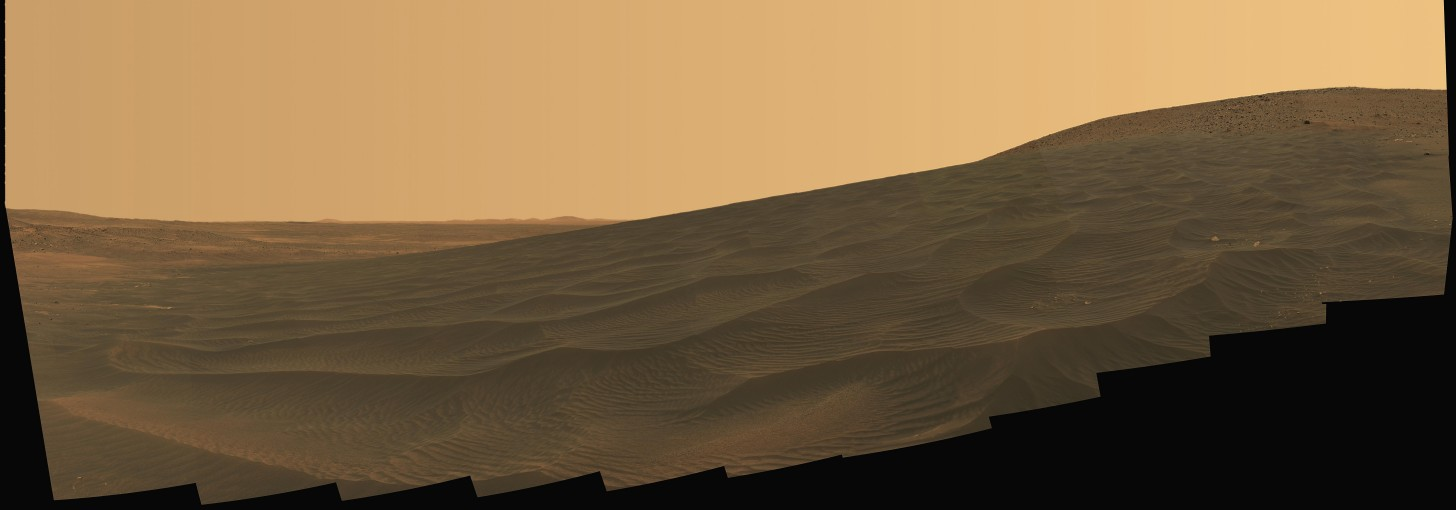
Sand dune on Mars

Dunes can likely be found in any environment where there is a substantial atmosphere, winds, and dust to be blown. Dunes are common on Mars and in the equatorial regions of Titan.

Titan's dunes include large expanses with average lengths of about 20–30 km. The regions are not topographically confined, resembling sand seas. These dunes are interpreted to be longitudinal dunes whose crests are oriented parallel to the dominant wind direction, which generally indicates west-to-east wind flow. The sand is likely composed of hydrocarbon particles, possibly with some water ice mixed in.

Dunes are a popular theme in science fiction, featuring in depictions of dry Desert planets appearing as early as the 1956 film Forbidden Planet and Frank Herbert's 1965 novel Dune. The environment of the desert planet Arrakis (also known as Dune) in the Dune franchise Dune in turn inspired the Star Wars franchise, which includes prominent theme of dunes on fictional planets such as Tatooine, Geonosis, and Jakku.

== See also ==
- Antidune
- Devil's stovepipe
- Ice dune
- List of landforms
- Masseira
- Médanos
- Sandhill
- Sand wave
- Singing sand
- Strand plain
