= Guy Prendergast =

Guy Prendergast may refer to:

- Guy Lenox Prendergast (politician), English MP for Lymington, 1826–27
- Guy Prendergast (cricketer) (1806–1887), English cricketer
- Guy Annesley Prendergast (1834–1919), British Indian Army major-general, son of the above
- Guy Prendergast (British Army officer) (died 1986), British Army officer and Saharan explorer
