= John Richard Easonsmith =

British Army officer (1909-1943)

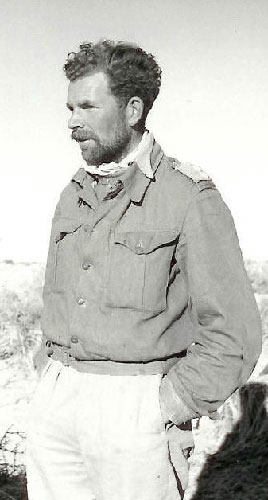
- "Jake" Easonsmith
- Born: 12 April 1909; Bristol, England
- Died: 16 November 1943 (aged 34); Leros, Greece
- Burial place: Leros war cemetery grave reference 3.B.3
- Military career
- Branch: British Army
- Service years: 1939–1943
- Rank: Lieutenant colonel
- Nickname: Jake
- Service number: 140546
- Commands: Long Range Desert Group
- Conflicts: Second World War: North African Campaign; Western Desert Campaign; Operation Agreement; Operation Caravan; Battle of Greece; Dodecanese Campaign; Battle of Leros †
- Awards: Distinguished Service Order; Military Cross

John ("Jake") Richard Easonsmith DSO, MC (12 April 1909 – 16 November 1943) was a British Army soldier during World War II. He was killed in action on the Dodecanese island of Leros whilst commanding the Long Range Desert Group in 1943. W. B. Kennedy-Shaw described him as: "Brave, wise, with an uprightness that shamed lesser men, he was, I think, the finest man we ever had in the L.R.D.G."

== Early life ==
John Richard Easonsmith was born in Bristol, England, on 12 April 1909, the son of George Easonsmith, a printer, and Daisy Easonsmith. He received his education at Mill Hill School in London, and Clifton College, Bristol. After leaving school he joined W.D. and H.O. Wills, a British tobacco importer and cigarette manufacturer in Bristol. Afterwards he entered the wine trade as a salesman with the Emu Australian Wine Company Limited. Recreationally he was a member and played for the Clifton Rugby Football Club. He married Honor Gertrude Marsh and together they had a daughter, Charlotte.

== Military career ==
On the outbreak of World War II in September 1939, Easonsmith joined the 4th Battalion Gloucestershire Regiment, a Territorial Army unit, that subsequently was converted to the 66th Search Light Regiment Royal Artillery. By August 1940 he had been promoted to the rank of sergeant and recommended for a commission, at the same time transferring to the Royal Tank Regiment. Having completed his officer training he received a commission as a subaltern in July 1940, and was posted to Egypt to take part in the British Empire's North Africa Campaign in December 1940. In March 1941 he applied for a transfer into the behind-enemy-lines reconnaissance unit the Long Range Desert Group (LRDG).

In August he was promoted to the rank of captain. He took part in the LRDG's New Zealander 'R1' Patrol's mission to pick up a detachment of the Special Air Service Regiment after that regiment's failed "Operation Squatter" raid against Axis desert airfields in November 1941. In December 1941 he was awarded the Military Cross for gallantry in action. Easonsmith led the Barce Raid. He was promoted to the rank of Major in October 1942, and in November 1942 was awarded the Distinguished Service Order. In October 1943 he was promoted to lieutenant colonel, and was appointed as Commanding Officer of the LRDG as the unit left the North African theatre and embarked upon the Dodecanese Campaign, landing on the island of Leros.

== Death ==
Easonsmith was killed in action at the age of 34 on 15 November 1943 during the Battle of Leros, when he was shot by a German sniper whilst carrying out a lone reconnaissance of a village. His body is buried in Leros War Cemetery, the gravestone bearing the quotation from Rupert Brooke's poem "The Soldier": "Some corner of a foreign field that is for ever England".

== Notes ==
Military offices
Preceded by Guy Lenox Prendergast	Commander, Long Range Desert Group; October 1943 – 15 November 1943	Succeeded by David Lloyd Owen
