= Pat Clayton =

British surveyor and soldier

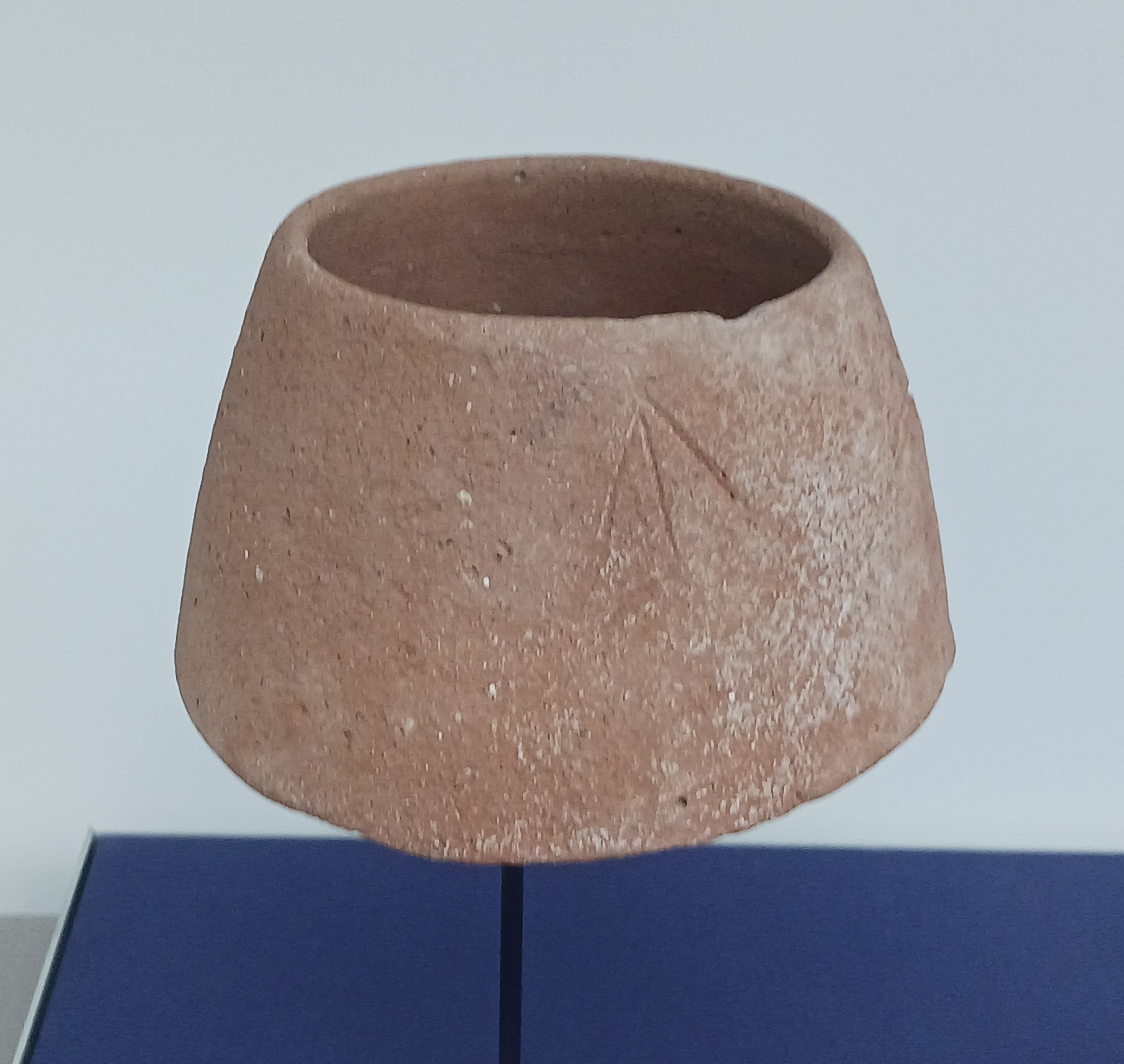
"Clayton ring". Bir Sahara BS-21, Early Dynastic period, A-Group culture, circa 2900 BCE. British Museum EA 76814.

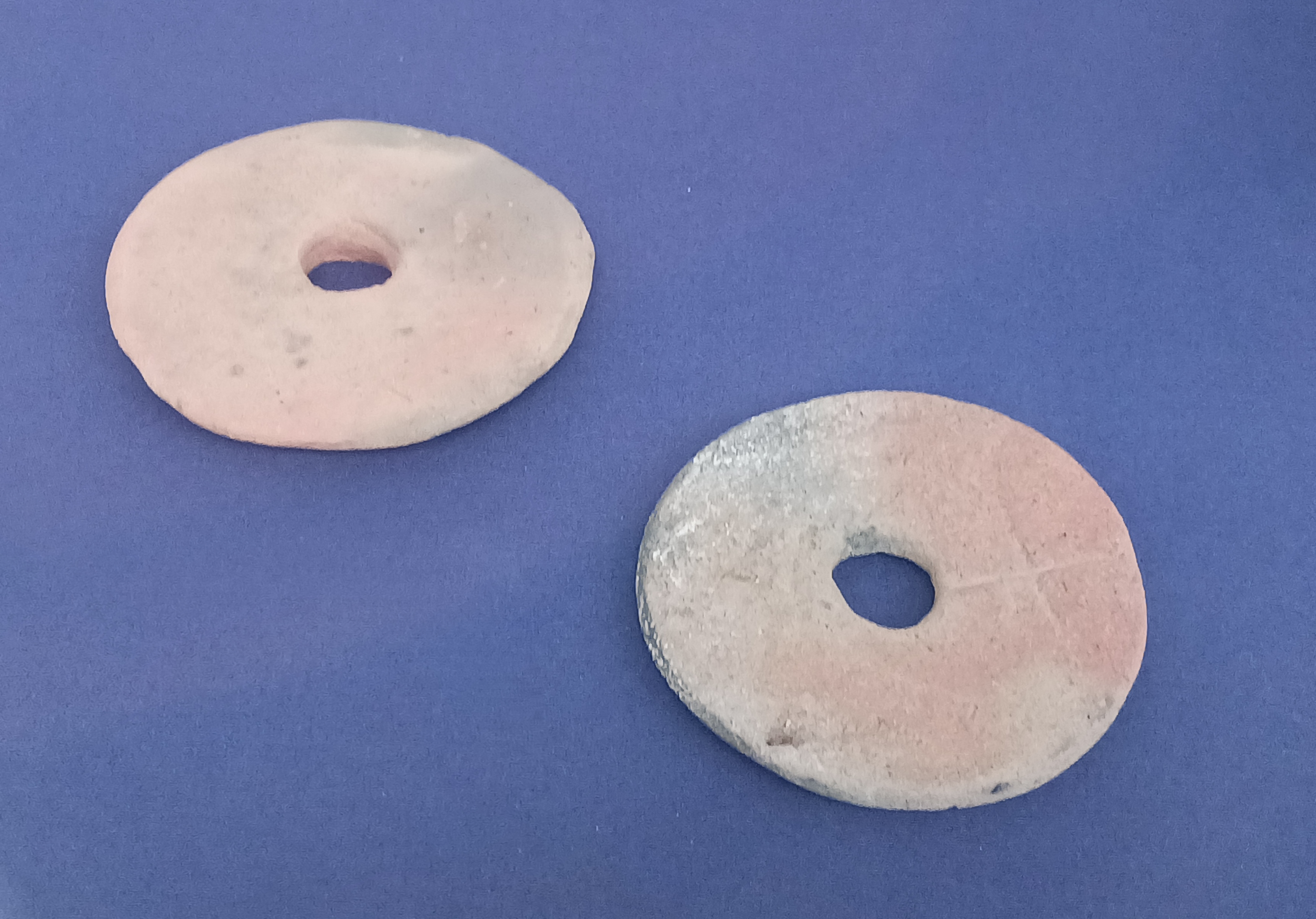
"Clayton disks". Bir Sahara BS-21, Early Dynastic period, circa 2900 BCE. British Museum.

Patrick Andrew Clayton DSO MBE (16 April 1896 – 17 March 1962) was a British surveyor and soldier. He was the basis for the character of Peter Madox in The English Patient.

== Career ==
Clayton was born in Croydon, London, in April 1896 and, after serving as an officer with the Royal Field Artillery of the British Army during World War I, spent nearly 20 years with the Egyptian Survey department during the 1920s and 1930s extensively mapping large areas of previously unmapped desert. In 1931, Clayton was running triangulation from Wadi Halfa to Uweinat when he came across refugees fleeing from the Italian occupation of Kufra, via Uweinat and helped save many from death in the arid desert. Clayton had collaborated extensively with Ralph Bagnold in the preparation and mapping associated with Bagnold's pre-war exploration trips.

At the start of the war Clayton was a government surveyor in Tanganyika. Bagnold had him returned to Egypt because of his detailed knowledge of the Western Desert. He was commissioned into the Intelligence Corps and served in the British Army's Long Range Desert Group (LRDG). Clayton was leading "T" Patrol in a planned attack on Kufra when the patrol was engaged by the Italian Auto-Saharan Company on 31 January 1941, near Gebel Sherif. During the action Captain Clayton was wounded and his car damaged. He along with his colleagues was taken prisoner. He was moved to the Abruzzo region in Italy where he was visited by Laszlo Almasy after Almasy's spy mission, Operation Salaam, to transport two German spies across the Libyan desert to Cairo.

He was awarded the Royal Geographical Society's Founder's Medal in 1941 for his work in the Libyan desert.

== Death ==
Pat Clayton died on 17 March 1962 at the age of 65 of an aneurysm.

Patrick Clayton Drive, built on the former School of Service Intelligence site in Ashford, Kent, is named after him.

== See also ==
- László Almásy
- Guy Lenox Prendergast
- Bill Kennedy Shaw
- Zerzura

== Notes ==
- Desert Explorer: A Biography of Colonel P.A. Clayton by Peter Clayton
- P. A. Clayton, "The Western Side of the Gilf Kebir" Geographical Journal 81, 254–259, (1933)
- Libyan Sands, Travel in a Dead World about the travels of R.A.Bagnold by Ralph Alger Bagnold
- Long Range Desert Group about the LRDG by Bill Kennedy Shaw
- The Long Range Desert Group about the LRDG by David Lloyd Owen
- The Hunt for Zerzura and World War II about members of the Zerzura Club in World War II by Saul Kelly
- The Secret Life of Laszlo Almasy by John Bierman
