= Long Range Desert Group =

Reconnaissance and raiding unit of the British Army

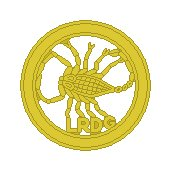
- LRDG badge depicting a scorpion within a wheel
- Active: July 1940 – August 1945
- Disbanded: 1 August 1945
- Country: United Kingdom
- Branch: British Army
- Role: Reconnaissance; Intelligence gathering Raiding operations
- Size: Maximum 350 all ranks
- Part of: Western Desert Force; Eighth Army
- Nicknames: Libyan Desert Taxi Service; Pattuglia Fantasma (Italian: Ghost Patrol)
- Mottos: Non Vi Sed Arte (Latin: Not by Strength, but by Guile) (unofficial)
- Equipment: Chevrolet or Ford trucks, Willys Jeep
- Engagements: Second World War: North African campaign; Battle of Kufra; Operation Caravan; Dodecanese Campaign; Battle of Leros; Albania; Yugoslavia; Italian Campaign

Commanders
- Notable commanders: Ralph Alger Bagnold; Guy Lenox Prendergast; John Richard Easonsmith; David Lloyd Owen

The Long Range Desert Group (LRDG) was a reconnaissance and raiding unit of the British Army during the Second World War.

Originally called the Long Range Patrol (LRP), the unit was founded in Egypt in June 1940 by Major Ralph Alger Bagnold, acting under the direction of General Archibald Wavell, General Officer Commanding-in-Chief of Middle East Command. Bagnold was assisted by Captain Patrick Clayton and Captain William Shaw. The majority of the men were from New Zealand, but they were soon joined by a few Southern Rhodesian and British volunteers, whereupon new sub-units were formed and the name was changed to the better-known Long Range Desert Group (LRDG). The LRDG never numbered more than 350 men, all of whom were volunteers.

The LRDG was formed specifically to carry out deep penetration, covert reconnaissance patrols and intelligence missions from behind Italian lines, although they sometimes engaged in combat operations. Because the LRDG were experts in desert navigation, they were sometimes assigned to guide other units, including the Special Air Service and secret agents across the desert. During the Desert Campaign between December 1940 and April 1943, the vehicles of the LRDG operated constantly behind the Axis lines, missing a total of only 15 days during the entire period. Possibly their most notable offensive action was during Operation Caravan, an attack on the town of Barce and its associated airfield, on the night of 13 September 1942. However, their most vital role was the 'Road Watch', during which they clandestinely monitored traffic on the main road from Tripoli to Benghazi, transmitting the intelligence to British Army Headquarters.

With the surrender of the Axis forces in Tunisia in May 1943, the LRDG changed roles and moved operations to the eastern Mediterranean, carrying out missions in the Greek islands, Italy and the Balkans. After the end of the war in Europe, the leaders of the LRDG made a request to the War Office for the unit to be transferred to the Far East to conduct operations against the Japanese Empire. The request was declined and the LRDG was disbanded in August 1945.

== Formation ==
Before the war, Major Ralph Bagnold in the course of exploring the Saharan desert (Note: Described in his book Libyan Sands: Travel in a Dead World published 1935), learned how to maintain and operate vehicles, how to navigate, and how to communicate in the desert. On 23 June 1940 he met General Archibald Wavell, the commander of Middle East Command in Alexandria and explained his concept for a group of men intended to undertake long-range reconnaissance patrols to gather intelligence behind the Italian lines in Libya. General Wavell was familiar with desert warfare, having been a liaison officer with the Egyptian Expeditionary Force during the First World War, and he understood and endorsed Bagnold's suggested concept. Wavell assisted in equipping the force.

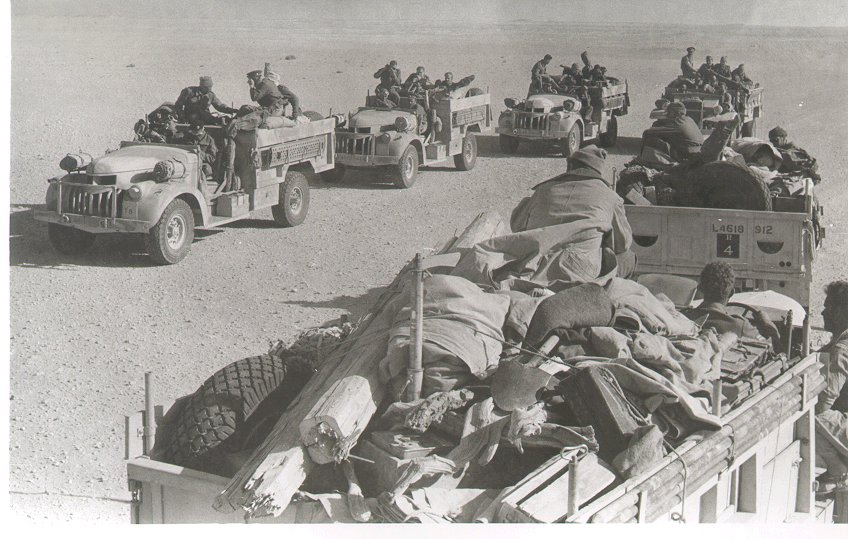
'Y' and 'R' Patrol Chevrolets meet in the desert, mid-1942. Note the amount of equipment carried on the nearest 'R' Patrol trucks

The unit, initially known as the No. 1 Long Range Patrol Unit (LRP), was founded on 3 July 1940. Bagnold wanted men who were energetic, innovative, self-reliant, physically and mentally tough, and able to live and fight in seclusion in the Libyan desert. Bagnold felt that New Zealand farmers would possess these attributes and was given permission to approach the 2nd New Zealand Division for volunteers; over half the division volunteered. Two officers and 85 other ranks including 18 administrative and technical personnel were eventually selected, coming mostly from the Divisional Cavalry Regiment and the 27th Machine-Gun Battalion. Once the men had been recruited, they started training in desert survival techniques and desert driving and navigation, with additional training in radio communications and demolitions.

The LRP could initially form only three units, known as patrols, (Note: 'Patrol' was capitalised when referring to a specific unit (for example, 'Y' Patrol) within the LRP and LRDG.) but a doubling of strength allowed the addition of a new Heavy Section. In November 1940, the name of the LRP was changed to the "Long Range Desert Group" (LRDG), and the New Zealanders were joined by volunteers from British and Southern Rhodesian regiments. The British volunteers, who came mostly from the Brigade of Guards and Yeomanry regiments, were incorporated into their own patrols. The original patrol unit consisted of two officers and 28 other ranks, equipped with a Canadian Military Pattern (CMP) Ford 15 Imperial hundredweight (cwt) truck and ten Chevrolet 30 cwt trucks. In March 1941 new types of trucks were issued and the patrol units were split into half-patrols of one officer and 15–18 men in five or six vehicles. Each patrol incorporated a medical orderly, a navigator, a radio operator and a vehicle mechanic, each of whom manned a truck equipped for their role.

== Patrols ==
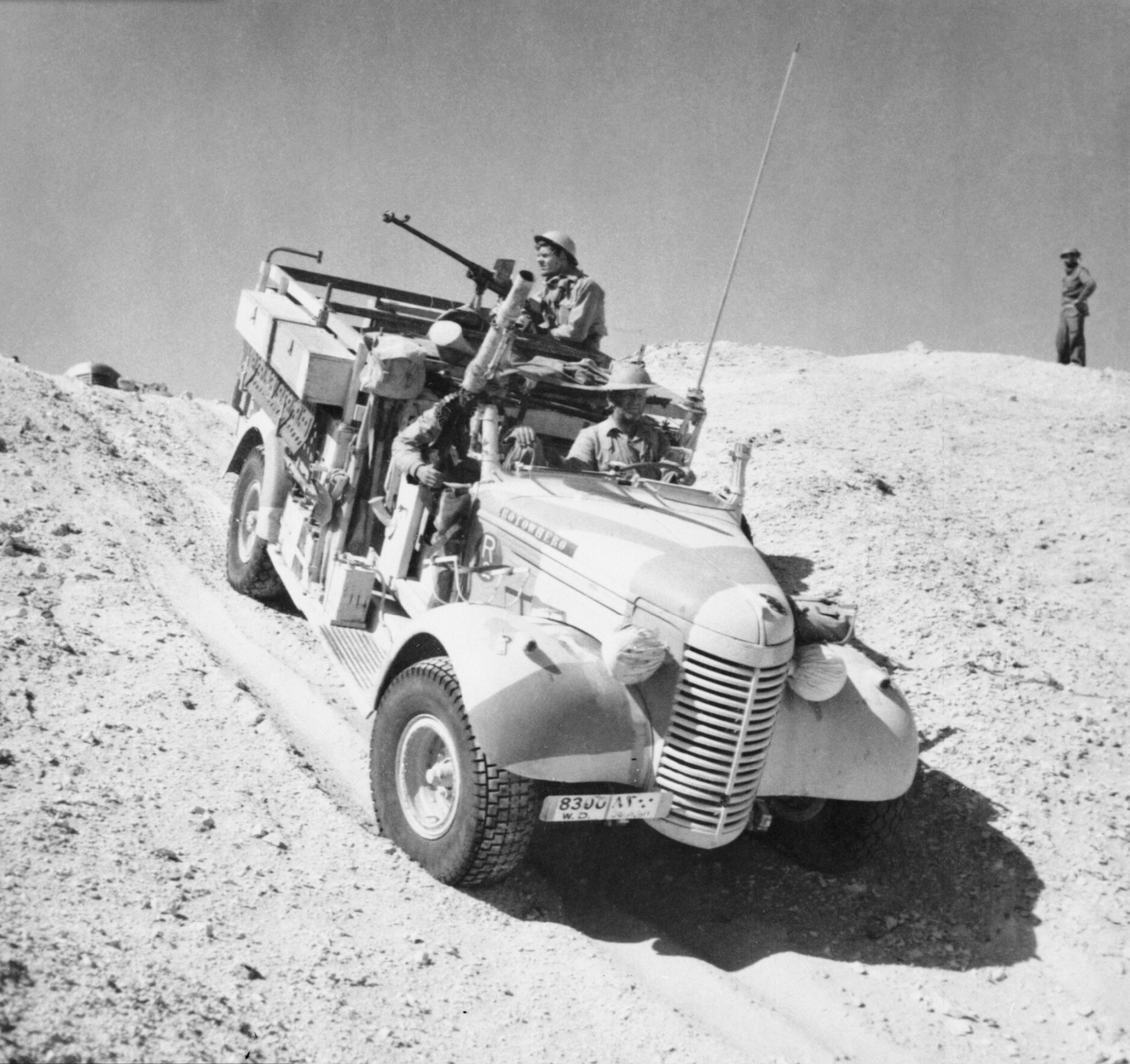
'R' Patrol Chevrolet WA radio truck; the rod antenna on the right. The man at the rear is manning a Boys anti-tank rifle

The Long Range Patrol comprised a 15-man headquarters with Bagnold in command. There were three sub-units: 'R' Patrol commanded by Captain Donald Gavin Steele, 'T' Patrol commanded by Captain Patrick Clayton and 'W' Patrol commanded by Captain Edward 'Teddy' Cecil Mitford. 'T' and 'W' Patrols were combat units while 'R' Patrol was intended to be a support unit.

In November 1940, the LRP was reorganised and re-designated as the Long Range Desert Group. It was expanded to six Patrols: 'T', 'W' and 'R' Patrols were joined by 'G', 'S' and 'Y' Patrols. Each patrol was expected to belong to the same regimental group, but only the Brigade of Guards and the Yeomanry regiments formed their own Patrols, 'G' and 'Y' respectively. The men of 'G' Patrol were drawn from the 3rd Battalion Coldstream Guards and the 2nd Battalion Scots Guards under command of Captain Michael Crichton-Stuart. The 'Y' Patrol men were drawn from the Nottinghamshire Yeomanry under command of Captain P. J. D. McCraith, with additional men from the Royal Northumberland Fusiliers and the Argyll and Sutherland Highlanders. In December 1940, 'W' Patrol was disbanded and its personnel used to bring 'R' and 'T' Patrols up to strength, while 'G' Patrol took over their vehicles. By June 1941 the LRDG was re-organised into two squadrons: the New Zealand and Rhodesian 'A' Squadron with 'S', 'T' and 'R' Patrols, and 'B' Squadron with 'G', 'H' and 'Y' Patrols. There was also a Headquarters Section along with signals, survey and light repair sections. A Heavy section, initially equipped with four 6-ton Marmon-Herrington trucks, (Note: As the Heavy Section expanded the Marmon-Herringtons were replaced by four White 10-ton trucks. The Whites were later replaced by Mack NR 9 trucks; by 1943 the Heavy Section was equipped with 20 CMP Ford F60s.) was used to provide logistical support by transporting supplies to bases and setting up hidden replenishment points at pre-arranged locations. In addition, there was an Air Section of two biplanes, a Waco ZGC-7 and a Waco YKC, that transported key personnel, evacuated wounded and performed other liaison tasks.

In August 1941 an artillery unit was formed to attack Italian forts more effectively. Initially it used a QF 4.5-inch howitzer carried on a 10-ton Mack NR 4 truck, with an accompanying light tank as an armoured observation post. However, these were handed over to the Free French at Kufra. The unit was then issued a 25-pounder gun-howitzer portee. The LRDG successfully attacked and captured the fort at El Gtafia using the gun, but later the truck had to be abandoned and the experiment ended.

=== Squadrons ===
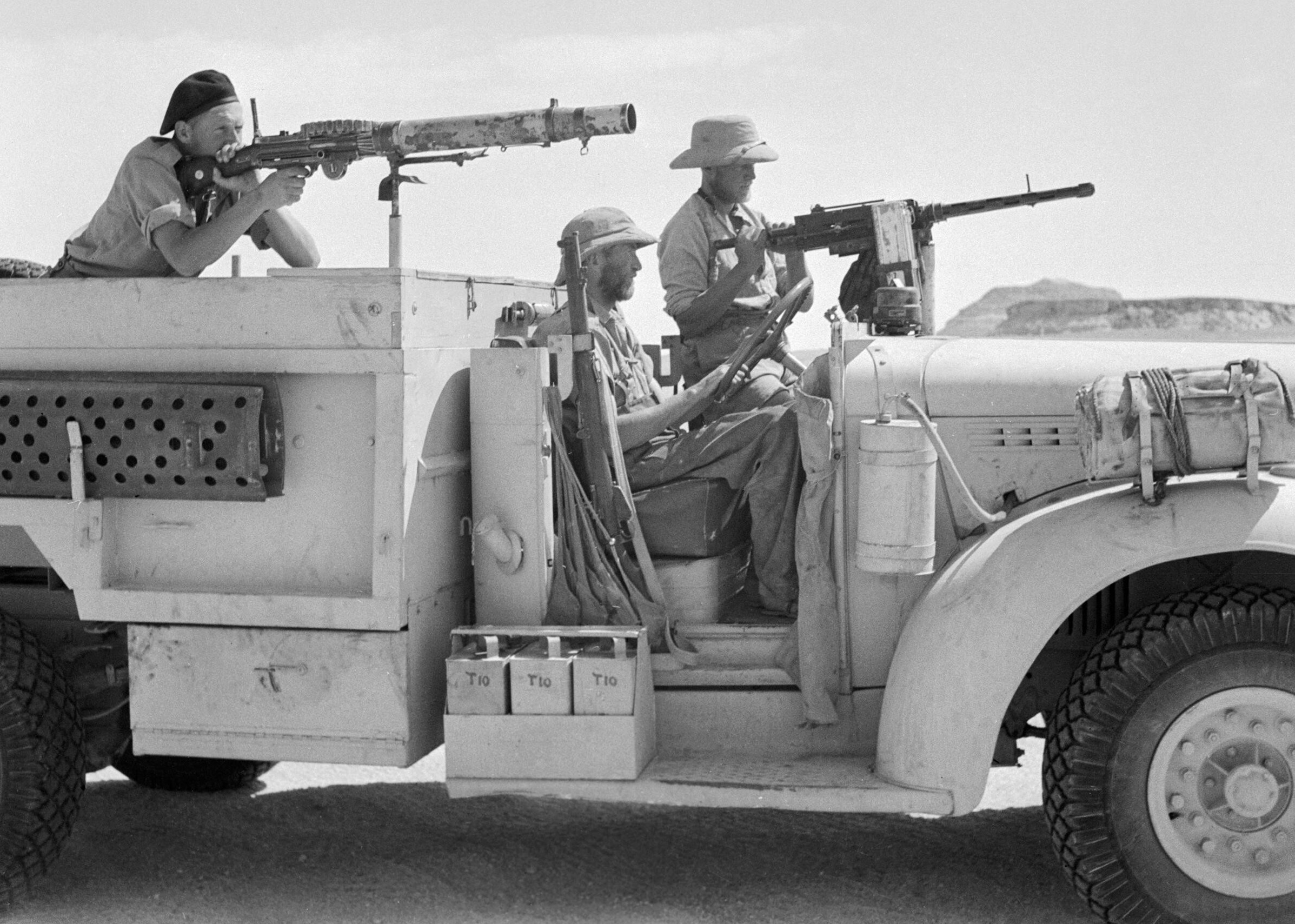
A 'T1' Patrol Chevrolet 1533X2 30 cwt: the small drum behind the front mudguard is the radiator condenser, and the truck's sand channels are mounted on brackets on the rear bodywork. The weapons are the Lewis gun (left) and a .303 Browning Mk II (right)

In October 1941 the LRDG was expanded to 10 patrols by the simple method of splitting the existing patrols into two-half patrols; the New Zealanders formed A Squadron comprising 'R1', 'R2', 'T1', and 'T2' Patrols and the British and Rhodesians formed B Squadron comprising 'G1', 'G2', 'S1', 'S2', 'Y1', and 'Y2' Patrols. The 'H' Patrol had been disbanded in September 1941 after three months service.

These two squadrons were joined in December 1941 by the Indian Long Range Squadron, which had been formed by volunteers from the 2nd Lancers, 11th Cavalry and the 18th Cavalry, all part of the 3rd Indian Motor Brigade. The Indian Squadron was organized along ethnic and religious lines with the first two patrols originally known as 'J' (Jats) and 'R' (Rajput) Patrols. Their designations were changed to 'I1' and 'I2' to avoid confusion. In October 1942 two further Indian patrols were formed: 'M' (Muslim) and 'S' (Sikh) Patrols, which became the 'I3' and 'I4' Patrols. No. 1 Demolition Squadron, nicknamed "Popski's Private Army" and commanded by Major Vladimir 'Popski' Peniakoff, was briefly attached to the LRDG beginning in December 1942.

The vehicles of each patrol adopted their own markings. The New Zealand 'R' Patrol used a green Hei-tiki with a red tongue painted on the right side of the bonnet of the vehicle, and on the left a Māori place name beginning with the letter 'R' (for example, 'Rotowaro'). The 'T' Patrol vehicles had a black Kiwi over green 'grass' and a Māori name starting with 'Te' (for example, 'Te Anau') in the corresponding places. The 'W' Patrol vehicles had a Māori name or word starting with 'W' painted on their vehicles.

The British 'G' Patrol vehicles carried no distinctive markings, although some vehicles had the Guards insignia. They took over 'W' Patrol's vehicles when that unit was disbanded. The 'Y' Patrol vehicles were slightly different; 'Y1' half-patrol vehicles all had names of famous drinking establishments (such as 'Cock O' The North') and 'Y2' half-patrol had names from the "Three Musketeers" books (for example, 'Aramis') on the left sides of their vehicle bonnets. The Headquarters Section used a sequence of letters arranged in a square (see photo of "Louise"). The Rhodesian 'S' Patrol vehicles had names with a Rhodesian connection (such as 'Salisbury') painted on the left side of the vehicles' bonnets. By 1943 the practice of naming replacement vehicles was dropped.

== Equipment ==
=== Vehicles ===
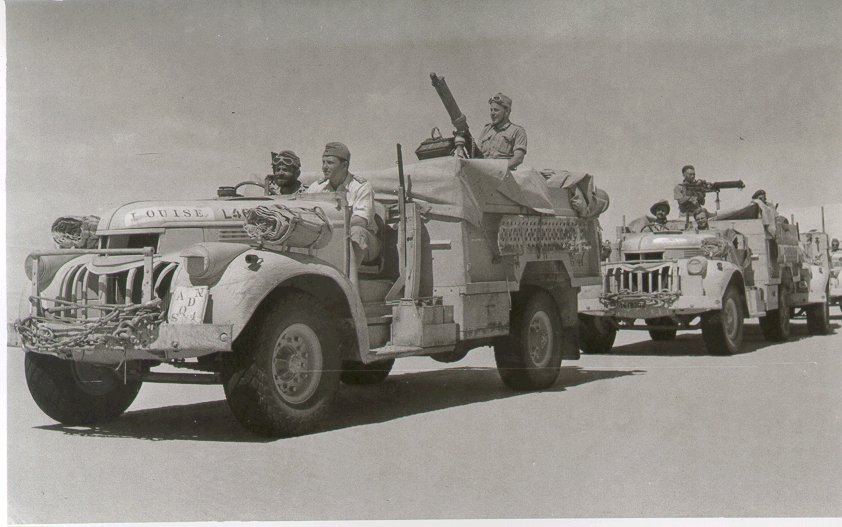
LRDG Headquarters Section (note markings on "Louise") of Chevrolet 30 cwt. The first two vehicles are armed with Vickers guns, and have canvas sand mats rolled up and stored on the front wheel arches.

The LRDG vehicles were mainly two wheel drive, chosen because they were lighter and used less fuel than four wheel drive. They were stripped of all non-essentials, including doors, windscreens and roofs. They were fitted with a bigger radiator, a condenser system, built up leaf springs for the harsh terrain, wide, low pressure desert tyres, sand mats and channels, (Note: The steel channels and canvas sand mats were used to release a vehicle caught in soft terrain. This entailed unloading the vehicle and digging shallow, sloped trenches in which the channels and mats could be placed under the wheels to provide traction.) plus map containers and a sun compass devised by Bagnold. Wireless trucks had special compartments built into the bodywork to house wireless equipment. Initially the LRDG patrols were equipped with one Canadian Military Pattern (CMP) Ford 15-cwt F15 truck for the commander, while the rest of the patrol used up to 10 Chevrolet 30 cwt 158.5" wheelbase (WB) trucks (the 'WA' model mentioned in some texts appears to be an 133 in (3.4 m) wheelbase version of the same vehicle). From March 1941 the 30 cwt Chevrolets were replaced by the CMP Ford 30 cwt F30, although in some ways this was a retrograde step as the four wheel drive and extra weight compared to the Chevrolets meant they used twice as much fuel, which reduced the range of a patrol. (Note: Because the bulk of the load carried by an LRDG truck was petrol, any increase in fuel consumption meant that there was less room for other essential supplies.) From March 1942 the Fords were progressively replaced by 200 Canadian Chevrolet 1533 X2 30 cwts, which had been specially ordered for the LRDG. (Note: The 1533X2 was essentially a civilian commercial truck converted and equipped for military use; these trucks were identified as Modified Conventional Pattern (MCP) rather than the purpose-built CMPs.) From July 1942 Willys jeeps began to be issued for the patrol commander and patrol sergeant.

General Order 297 of 22 November 1940 specified that all vehicles in the Middle East were to be painted with a common basic colour of Light Stone, i.e., the BSC (British Standard Colour) number 61, which is a medium toned yellow with a brown tinge which veterans refer to as desert yellow. To achieve the Caunter camouflage scheme, two contrasting colours may be applied along with this basic colour, these being Silver Grey BSC number 28 a greyish pastel green, and Slate BSC number 34. All three colours were specified in "BSC 381:C 1930 Colours for Ready Mixed Paints".

=== Weapons ===
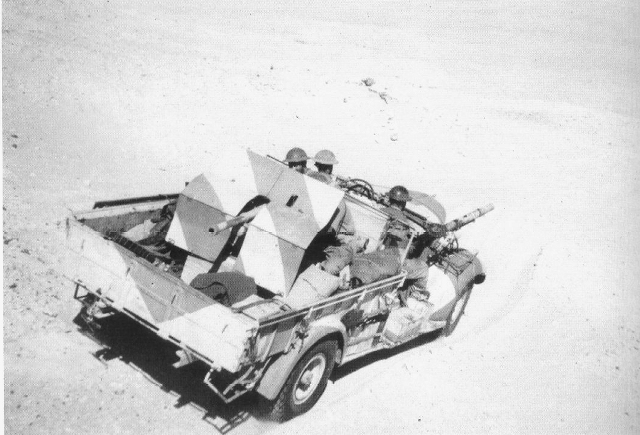
A Chevrolet WB with a Bofors 37 mm anti-tank gun mounted at the rear

The patrol vehicles were initially armed with 11 Lewis machine guns, four Boys anti-tank rifles and a Bofors 37 mm anti-tank gun distributed amongst their vehicles. By December 1940, the vehicle armaments had been improved and 'T' Patrol, for example, had five .303 Vickers Medium Mk. I machine guns, five Lewis guns, four Boys anti-tank guns and the Bofors 37 mm. Another Vickers gun used was the heavy Vickers .50 machine gun, which would be mounted at the rear of the vehicle. All of the unit's vehicles were armed with at least one gun; each vehicle was fitted with six to eight gun mountings, but normally only two or three of them would be in use.

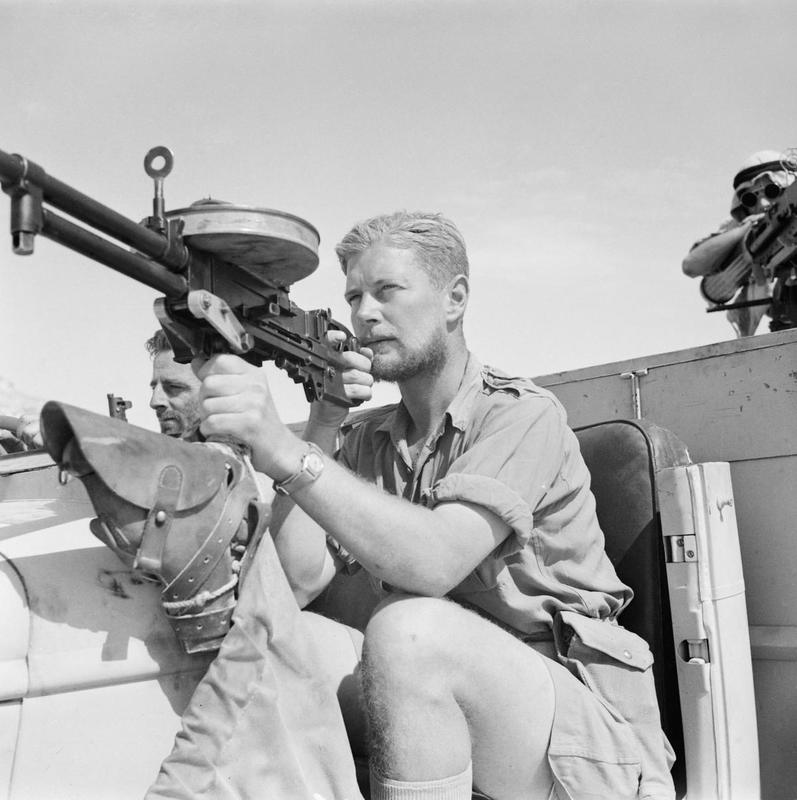
A member of a LRDG patrol poses with a Vickers K machine gun on a Chevrolet 30-cwt truck, May 1942.

Supplementing their army-supplied weapons, the LRDG was equipped with surplus Royal Air Force (RAF) aircraft guns, which were acquired for their high rate of fire. The most widely used of these was the Vickers K machine gun, which was sometimes used mounted in pairs. From mid-1941 the LRDG acquired .303 Browning Mk II's from RAF stocks, also mounted in pairs, with a combined rate of fire of 2,400 rounds per minute. When new vehicles were issued in March 1942, several were converted to carry captured dual-purpose 20 mm Breda Model 35s, which replaced the Bofors 37 mm, and each half-patrol was equipped with one Breda "Gun truck". In September 1942 the .50 Browning AN/M2 heavy machine gun began to replace both calibres of the Vickers machine guns and the Boys anti-tank rifle.

The men of the LRDG carried the standard British Second World War small arms, the Lee–Enfield No.1 Mk III* being the primary rifle. (Note: Although some references refer to the No. 4 Mk I rifle, it was not introduced into service until the spring of 1942 and was rarely, if ever, used by the LRDG in the desert.) Other small arms carried were Thompson submachine guns and .38 Enfield, Webley & Scott revolvers or .45 Colt 1911A1 automatic pistols. Several types of hand grenade were used: the Mills bomb, the No. 68 Anti-tank and the No. 69. Each truck was outfitted with a Lee–Enfield EY rifle attachment with a discharger cup able to fire the No. 36M Mills rifle grenade. The LRDG also laid land mines, the most common being the Mk 2 mine. Other explosives included the Lewes bombs, a field produced weapon using Plastic explosive, diesel and thermite to create an incendiary device used to destroy aircraft and other targets, and sticky bombs used to destroy enemy vehicles.

Captured German and Italian small arms were utilised including the Beretta M 1934, Luger P08 and Walther P38 pistols. The German MP40 submachine gun and MG34, MG42 along with Italian Breda M37 and Breda M38 machine guns were all used.

=== Communications ===
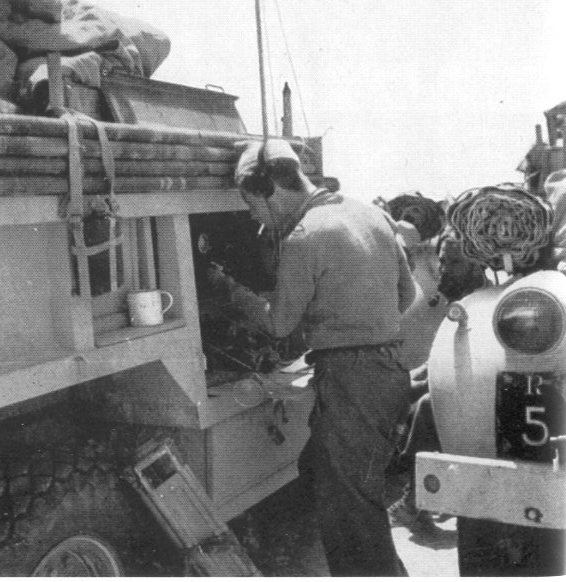
Radio operator, Corporal Arthur George Biddle RCS, of 'R1' Patrol using the No 11 Wireless set mounted on a 30 cwt Chevrolet 1533 X2. The rod aerial is just above his head. The four wooden support poles for the Windom dipole antenna are carried on brackets on the wooden 'greedy boards'. The canvas sand mat can be seen rolled up on the right hand vehicle. (Note: The 'greedy boards' were used to extend the load height of the Godfredson 4B1 Steel ammunition body used on Chevrolet 1533X2s; the steel tubes used to secure the boards doubled as weapons mounts (see photo of "T10").)

In the LRP, most of the radio operators were New Zealanders, but the LRDG radio operators were all from the Royal Corps of Signals. These men were skilled in communications and were able to maintain and repair their equipment without any outside help. On only three occasions did a broken radio prevent a patrol communicating with its headquarters. All LRDG patrols included one vehicle equipped with a Wireless Set No. 11 and a non-military Philips model 635 receiver. The No. 11 Set had been designed for use in tanks, and had transmitter and receiver circuits; the Royal Signals expected to use the No. 11 set to transmit and receive between 3 miles (4.8 km) and 20 miles (32 km) with the use of 6-foot (1.8 m) or 9-foot (2.7 m) antennas. The LRDG used Morse code for all transmissions, and were able to transmit over great distances using either a dipole antenna system attached to a 6.3 feet (1.9 m) rod antenna mounted on the truck, which was adequate up to 500 miles (800 km), or for greater distances, a Windom dipole system slung between two 17 feet (5.2 m) tall poles. The disadvantage of using the Windom system was that it took time to erect and work out the correct antenna length, so it could only be used in a relatively safe area. To power the No. 11 set extra batteries had to be carried by the radio vehicles. The Philips receiver was used to monitor Greenwich Mean Time (GMT) time checks, which was vital for desert navigation. (Note: On occasion the Philips was used to listen to BBC radio or music like the song Lili Marleen.)

While on the move the lead vehicles of the patrol commanders and sergeants flew a small flag. Because the LRP was organised on divisional cavalry lines the leaders carried green flags for 'A' (HQ) Troop, black for 'B' Troop, yellow for 'C' Troop and red for 'D'. When the LRDG was organised into 11 vehicle patrols this was simplified to a green flag displaying the patrol letter in white; the later half-patrols used a plain green flag on occasion. When it became necessary to change course from an intended route, or in the event of enemy action, patrol movements were controlled by a simple semaphore flag system using blue and white signal flags, (Note: Some typical signals were 'Enemy in sight': a flag waved vertically, and 'Disperse': two horizontal flags waved up and down.) or hand signals, depending on how widely dispersed the trucks were.

=== Navigation ===
All trucks of the LRDG were equipped with the Bagnold sun compass and some trucks were also equipped with a P8 Tank Compass. Each patrol had a navigator who always rode in the second truck in the formation. He was equipped with a theodolite and astronomical position tables with which to plot star sightings, and maps. Watches were used and adjusted each evening using the GMT time check. One major problem faced early on by the LRDG was a lack of accurate maps for Libya in particular. Patrols had to do their own surveys and make their own maps of each route they took. In July 1941 the Survey Section was formed to carry out this task.

== History ==
LRDG area of operations 1940–1943. Jalo oasis is on the left of the Great Sand Sea and Siwa Oasis is on the right. Barce is at the top left and Marble Arch is on the edge of the map, to the left of El Agheila.

The LRDG area of operations between 1940 and 1943, known as the Western Desert, stretched about 930 miles (1,500 km) south from the Mediterranean to the Tibesti and the Jebel Uweinat mountains, and about 1,200 miles (1,900 km) from the Nile valley in the east to the mountains of Tunisia and Algeria in the west. Paved roads were non-existent and only small tracks and pathways crossed the area. The daytime temperatures could reach 60 °C (140 °F) and at night drop below freezing. The only water in the area is found in a number of small oases, which is also where the only vegetation grows. While the vast majority of Eighth Army operated along the coast, the LRDG started operations inland south of the Great Sand Sea, were later based there and operated west and north, and were later based further west, well south of the coast.

The first LRP patrol began during the Italian invasion of Egypt. 'W' Patrol commanded by Captain Mitford set out on 15 September 1940 to carry out a reconnaissance of Kufra and Uweinat. Finding no trace of the Italians, they turned south and attacked fuel dumps, aircraft and an Italian convoy carrying supplies to Kufra. 'T' Patrol, commanded by Captain Clayton, reconnoitred the main route between Kufra and Uweinat, then drove south to meet up with 'W' Patrol; both units returned to base, having captured two Italian trucks and official mail. The Italian response to these raids was to reduce their front line forces and increase the number of troops garrisoning the area from 2,900 men in September to 5,500 by November 1940. On 27 December 1940, 'G' and 'T' Patrols left Cairo and crossed the desert to northwest of Kufra. On arrival they met with representatives from the Free French forces in Chad, and on 11 January carried out a joint raid on the Italian fort at Murzuk. After two hours' fighting the fort remained in Italian hands, but the adjoining airfield had been destroyed. The units then withdrew southwards towards the Free French post at Zouar.

On 31 January they were intercepted by the Compagnia Autosahariana di Cufra, an Italian unit similar to the LRDG, in the Gebel Sherif valley. The LRDG had one man killed and three men captured, including Major Clayton, and three trucks destroyed during the battle. The Italian losses were five killed and three wounded, and one truck was abandoned. Four members of the LRDG escaped by walking 200 miles (320 km) to safety in ten days with no food and only a two gallon water can between them. The patrol arrived back in Egypt on 9 February; it had covered about 4,500 miles (7,200 km), experiencing the loss of six trucks, four by enemy action and two by mechanical breakdowns. One vehicle with a broken rear axle had been towed about 900 miles (1,400 km) before it could be repaired. Total casualties were three dead and three captured. Major Clayton was awarded the Distinguished Service Order.

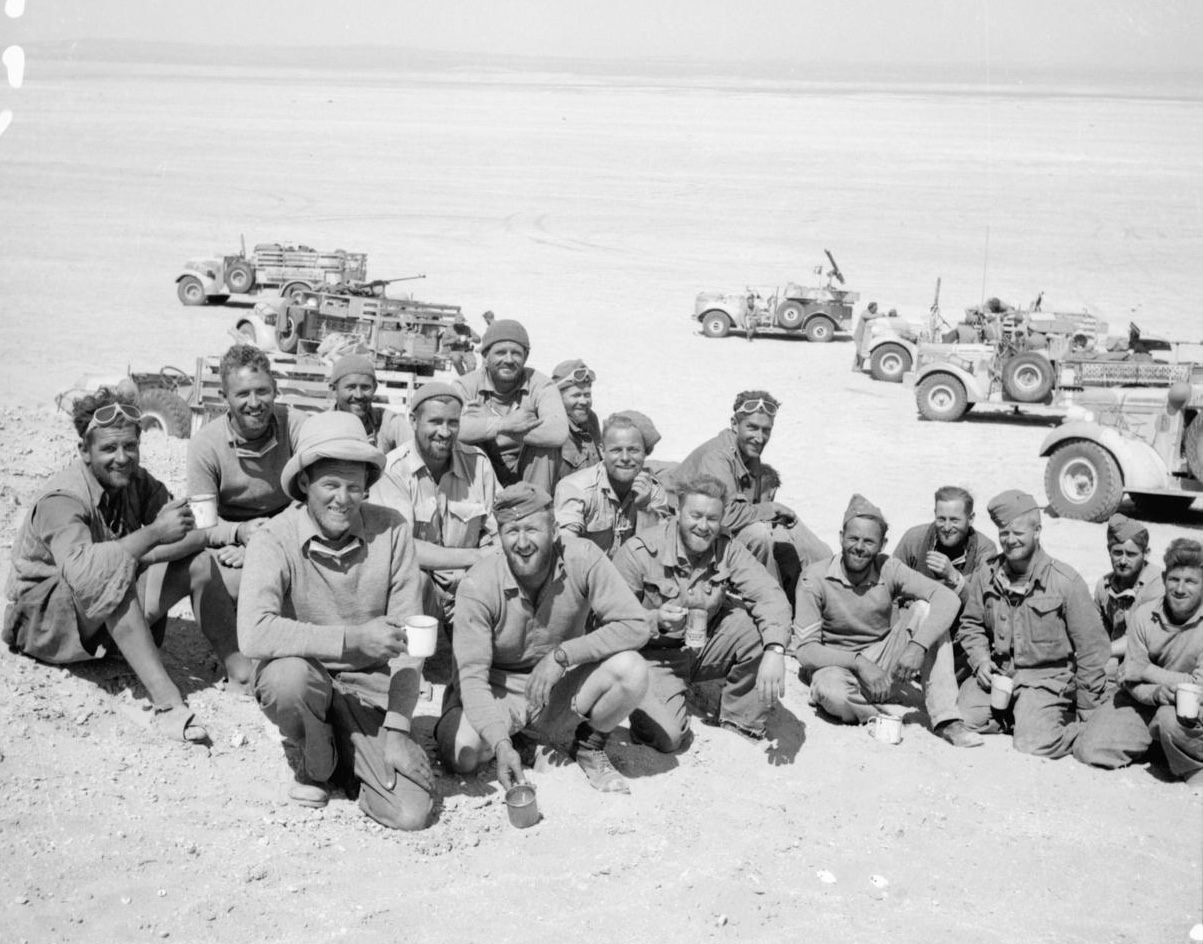
New Zealand members of the Long Range Desert Group in North Africa

After Operation Compass ended with the Italians forced out of Cyrenaica it was decided to move the LRDG from Cairo to Kufra (SE Libya). At the same time the LRDG was expanded with the addition of 'Y' and 'S' Patrols. When the German Afrika Korps under command of General Erwin Rommel counterattacked in April 1941, the LRDG was ordered to reinforce the Kufra area. 'R' Patrol were based at Taiserbo, 'S' Patrol at Zighen, and the headquarters LRDG, 'T' Patrol, and the Free French were at Kufra, under command of Bagnold. The detached 'G' and 'Y' Patrols were based at Siwa Oasis, under command of XIII Corps.

The LRDG air link was created during the occupation of Kufra by Major Guy Lenox Prendergast. Appreciating the value of aircraft for reconnaissance, liaison, evacuating wounded and flights to GHQ Cairo, he had two Waco aircraft fitted with long range fuel tanks. Prendergast flew one himself and Sergeant R. F. T. Barker flew the other. When Bagnold was appointed to the General Staff Cairo in August 1941, Prendergast was given command of the LRDG.

The LRDG now began a series of patrols behind the Axis lines. Near the end of July 'T' Patrol left for the desert to the south of the Gulf of Sirte. One 'T' Patrol truck managed to observe the main coastal road, along which Axis traffic was passing. They were followed two or three weeks later by 'S' Patrol, who carried out a similar reconnaissance between Jalo oasis and Agedabia. Both patrols returned safely to Kufra without being discovered. In August 1941 'R' Patrol relieved 'G' and 'Y' Patrols at Siwa and was joined by 'T' Patrol in October.

=== Eighth Army command ===
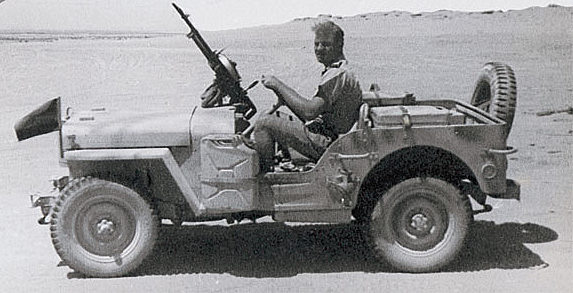
A Vickers K armed Jeep of 'G' Patrol on the way to Barce during Operation Caravan, September 1942.

In November 1941 the LRDG, now under command of the newly formed Eighth Army, moved from Kufra to Siwa (central Libya). The patrols were given the task of watching the desert tracks south of Jebel Akhdar and report any signs of reinforcements and withdrawals. 'R1' Patrol was to pick up Captain David Stirling and 30 men who had parachuted behind the lines to raid airfields to the west of Tobruk. Only 21 men arrived at the rendezvous and were returned to the British lines, later becoming the nucleus of the Special Air Service (SAS). One of the other roles assigned to the LRDG was to transport SAS units behind enemy lines; this continued until the SAS were issued with their own transport in 1942. In early November 'T2' Patrol took four British officers to the Gebel and was to return and collect them three weeks later. The officers were the advance land party of Operation Flipper, which had planned to kill General Rommel.

On 24 November, in support of Operation Crusader, the LRDG were ordered to attack Axis rear areas. Already on patrol, 'Y1' and 'Y2' Patrols attacked targets in the Mechili, Derna and Gazala area. 'Y1' damaged fifteen vehicles in a transport park and 'Y2' captured a small fort and about 20 Italians. 'S2' and 'R2' Patrols attacked targets in the Benghazi, Barce and Marawa area, where they ambushed nine vehicles. 'G1' and 'G2' Patrols were assigned the main road near Agedabia where 'G1' made two attacks on road traffic and shot up a few vehicles. After the Axis forces withdrew from Cyrenaica the LRDG moved to a base at Jalo oasis, about 140 miles (230 km) to the south-south-east of Ajdabiya.

The last operations of 1941 were in December, when the LRDG twice ferried the SAS to and from raids on Axis airfields, attacking the airfields at Sirte (twice), El Agheila, Ajdabiya, Nofaliya and Tamit, and destroying 151 aircraft and 30 vehicles. During the second raid at Sirte, the SAS devised a new method of attacking parked aircraft. They drove the LRDG trucks between the rows of aircraft, which were then engaged by machine guns and hand grenades. Prior to this the procedure had been to quietly infiltrate an airfield and place Lewes bombs on aircraft and vehicles, leaving before the bombs exploded, but this attack was so successful that it became the preferred method for attacking airfields.

=== Road watch ===
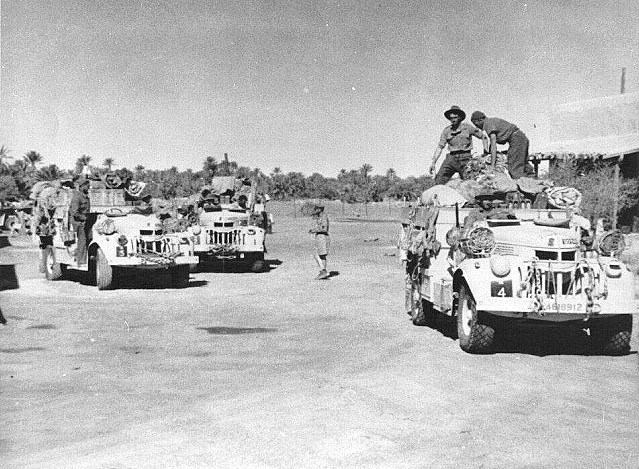
Heavily laden Chevrolets of 'R1' Patrol setting out from Jalo oasis in 1942. The unit insignia of a Māori Hei-Tiki can just be seen on the bonnet of the lead vehicle, which carries its individual number "R4" on a dark square on the right mudguard.

When the LRDG was based at Siwa, they took part in what has since become known as the 'Road Watch' along the Via Balbia (the Tripoli to Benghazi road). Three patrols were engaged on road watch duties at any one time, with one watching the road for a week to 10 days, another would be en route to relieve them and the third was returning to Siwa after having been relieved. The site of the road watch was about 5 miles (8.0 km) from the Marble Arch monument. The road watch patrol would park about 2 miles away from the road and the trucks would be camouflaged using camouflage nets, any local foliage and sand. Before dawn each day two men would move into a well camouflaged position about 350 yards (320 m) from the road. By day they would record the details of all vehicles and troop movements, and at night they would move to about 30 yards (27 m) from the road and guess what type of vehicles were passing by their sound and outline. At daylight they were relieved by another pair of men who took over that day's road watch.

If tanks or a large number of troops were seen passing, they would radio the LRDG headquarters at Siwa immediately so that by the time the enemy reached the front line, GHQ at Cairo would know they were coming. Once a patrol was relieved they would transmit details of all they had seen back to Siwa. The LRDG did not lose any men or vehicles when on the road watch, but they did have some close encounters. On 21 March 'R1' Patrol was surrounded by a convoy of 27 vehicles and about 200 men who stopped for the night between the watchers and their vehicles. While the road watch was ongoing, other patrols would be attacking targets along other stretches of the Tripoli to Benghazi road, by planting mines or attacking vehicles with machine gun fire. The road was kept under constant observation from 2 March to 21 July 1942.

After the Battle of Gazala and the fall of Tobruk, the LRDG were forced to withdraw from Siwa on 28 June. 'A' Squadron withdrew to Cairo to resupply and then moved back to Kufra, while 'B' Squadron moved to Faiyum.

=== Barce ===
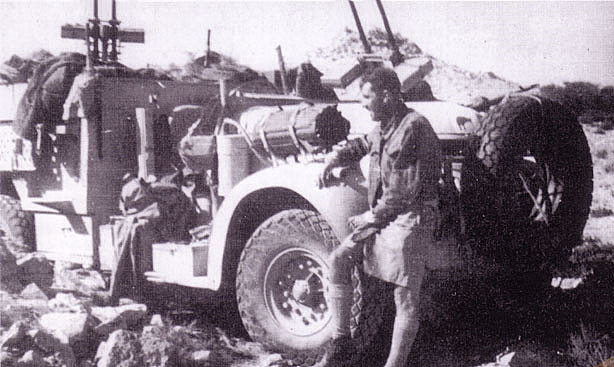
"Te Anau II" of 'T1' Patrol was the only remaining Chevrolet to survive air attack during the withdrawal from Operation Caravan. The vehicle is armed with two twin Browning machine guns.

With the Eighth Army now holding the El Alamein line, plans were submitted to attack the Axis supply lines and the ports of Benghazi and Tobruk. In September 1942, British Commandos would attack Tobruk by land and sea (Operation Agreement). The SAS would attack Benghazi (Operation Bigamy) and the Sudan Defence Force would capture Jalo oasis (Operation Nicety). The LRDG would be used to guide the attacking forces to their targets and at the same time, a LRDG force would attack Barce (Operation Caravan). The Barce force consisted of 17 vehicles and 47 men of 'G1' and 'T1' Patrols, which had to travel 1,155 miles (1,859 km) to reach their target. On arrival 'T1' Patrol attacked the airfield and 'G1' the Barce barracks. The attack on the airfield destroyed 35 aircraft according to an Italian prisoner of war. Official Italian figures quote 16 aircraft destroyed and seven damaged.

On 30 September 1942, the LRDG ceased to be under command of the Eighth Army and came under direct command of GHQ Middle East. The final LRDG operation in North Africa was in Tunisia during the Mareth Offensive when they guided the 2nd New Zealand Division around the Mareth Line in March 1943.

=== Post 1943 operations ===
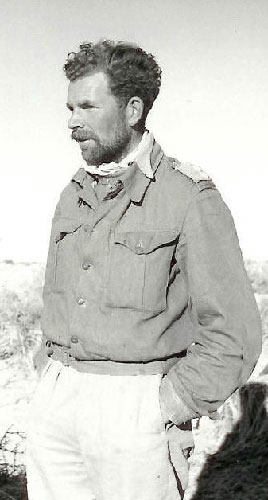
LRDG commanding officer Lieutenant Colonel John Richard Easonsmith DSO MC was killed in action during the Battle of Leros.

In May 1943 the LRDG was sent to Lebanon to retrain in mountain warfare. However, following the Italian armistice in 1943, they were sent to Leros, one of the Dodecanese islands, to serve as normal infantry. They later took part in the Battle of Leros, where the commanding officer John Richard Easonsmith was killed and replaced by David Lloyd Owen. After the battle the New Zealanders, consisting of two officers and approximately 46 men, were withdrawn from the LRDG and returned to their division at the request of the New Zealand Government, which was concerned about their deployment to Leros.

In December 1943, the LRDG re-organised into two squadrons of eight patrols. Each patrol contained one officer and 10 other ranks. Major Moir Stormonth Darling was given command of the British Squadron and Major Kenneth Henry Lazarus the Rhodesian Squadron. Patrols were then parachuted north of Rome to obtain information about German troop movements, and also carried out raids on the Dalmatian Islands and Corfu.

In August 1944, British Squadron patrols were parachuted into Yugoslavia. One patrol destroyed two 40 feet (12 m) spans of a large railway bridge, which caused widespread disruption to the movement of German troops and supplies. The commanding officer Lieutenant-Colonel Owen and a team of 36 men were parachuted into Albania in September 1944. Their mission was to follow the German retreat and assist Albanian resistance groups in attacking them. In October 1944, two British Squadron patrols were parachuted into the Florina area of Greece. Here they mined a road used by the retreating Germans, destroying three vehicles and blocking the road. Firing on the stranded convoy from an adjacent hillside, they directed RAF aircraft in to destroy the rest of the convoy.

After the end of the war in Europe, the leaders of the LRDG made a request to the War Office for the unit to be transferred to the Far East to conduct operations against the Japanese Empire. The request was declined and the LRDG was disbanded in August 1945.

== Legacy ==
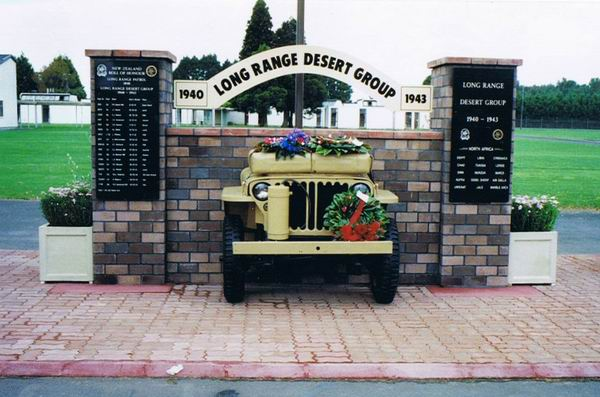
LRDG Memorial at Papakura Military Camp, New Zealand

The Long Range Desert Group was disbanded at the end of the Second World War. The only comparable British Army units today are the Mobility troops of the Special Air Service. Each of the regular army Special Air Service squadrons has a Mobility troop. Like the LRDG, they are specialists in using vehicles, trained in an advanced level of motor mechanics to fix any problem with their vehicles, and are experts in desert warfare.

The Long Range Desert Group is one of the Second World War units represented by the Special Air Service Association. Other wartime units represented include all the SAS regiments, the Special Raiding Squadron, the Special Boat Service (Wartime), the Phantom Signal Squadron, the Raiding Support Regiment and the Greek Sacred Squadron.

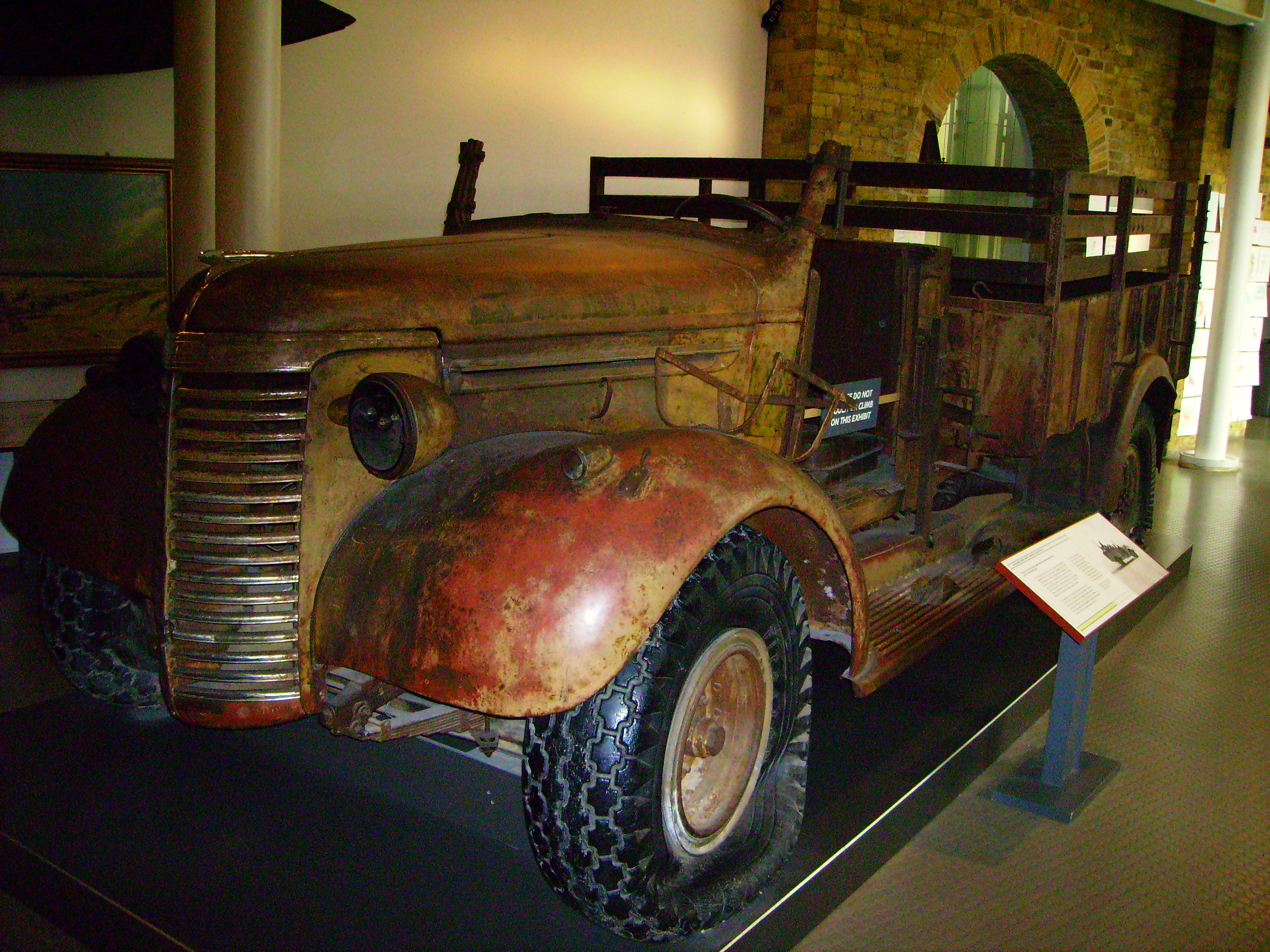
LRDG Chevrolet WB, Imperial War Museum (2007)

The New Zealand Army erected a permanent memorial to the LRDG at the New Zealand Special Air Service barracks, in the Papakura Military Camp. On 7 August 2009, two honour boards containing details of every New Zealand soldier who served in the LRDG were unveiled.

One of the LRDG's Chevrolet WB trucks is displayed in the Imperial War Museum in London. It was presented to the museum by the LRDG Association, after being recovered from the Libyan desert in 1983 by David Lloyd Owen, by then a retired Major General and chairman of the Association. It is preserved in the condition in which it was discovered, rusted but largely intact.

By November 2024 there was only one surviving member of the group, Jack Mann. Mann died in August 2026.

== Notable personnel ==
- Ronald Joseph Moore, leader of the "Moore's March" of LRDG survivors through the Libyan desert

== Popular culture ==
- Sea of Sand (1958). Film depicting an LRDG patrol mission behind enemy lines on the eve of the Second Battle of El Alamein.
- Gli scorpioni del deserto (1969–92). Comic book series by Hugo Pratt and others.
- Killing Rommel (2008). An historical fiction novel by Steven Pressfield depicting the LRDG's activities.
- Lost in Libya – In Search of the Long Range Desert Group (2009). Television documentary film tracing three LRDG lorries that were abandoned at Gebel Sherif in Southern Libya in 1941 after the unit's first encounter with its Italian equivalent, the Autosahariana. Includes archival film of the LRDG in action. First aired on ANZAC day, 25 April 2009 on Television New Zealand.
- SAS: Rogue Heroes (2022). A British television historical drama series that is mainly focused on the SAS, but with some mentions of the LRDG.
- Undaunted: North Africa (2020). A board game about historical encounters in the North African Campaign between the LRDG and Italy.

== Notes ==
Footnotes

Citations
