= Bigamy (disambiguation) =

Bigamy is the act of entering into a marriage with one person while still legally married to another.

Bigamy may also refer to:

- Bigamy (canon law)
- Bigamy (1922 film), a German silent drama film
- Bigamy (1927 film), a German silent drama film
- Operation Bigamy, a raid during the Second World War by the Special Air Service
