= Operation Nicety =

WW2 Allied operation in North Africa (Sep 1942)

- Part of Western Desert campaign
Date	15–16 September 1942
Location	Jalo oasis, Italian Libya, North Africa
Result	Italian victory

Belligerents
United Kingdom	Italy

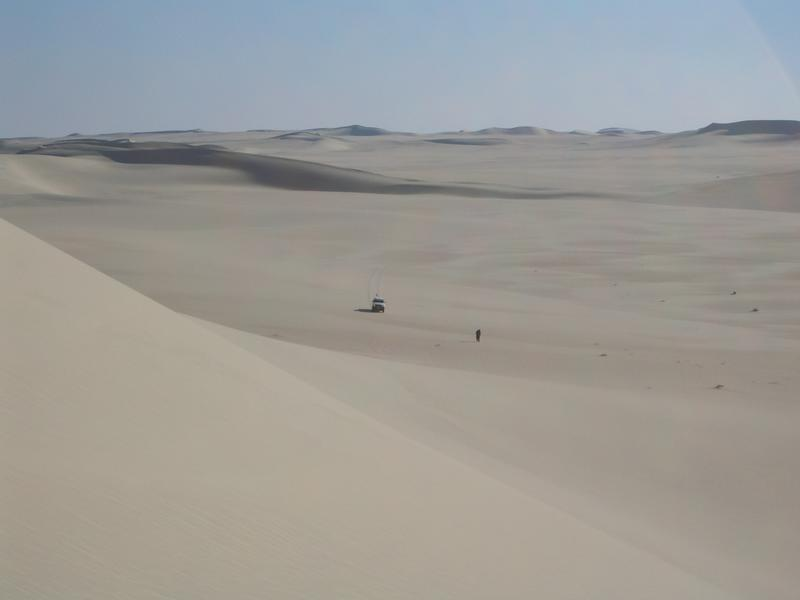
Sahara Desert landscape in Jalu, Libya

Operation Nicety was an operation in September 1942 during the Second World War by Force Z a battalion of the Sudan Defence Force. It was designed to support the raiding forces taking part in Operation Agreement, Operation Caravan and Operation Bigamy. The objective of the operation was the seizure of the Jalo oasis in the Libyan Desert to support the withdrawal of the forces involved in the other operations. The operation was a failure: the Germans had discovered the plans for all four operations on the body of a dead officer taking part in Operation Agreement. Forewarned, the Italian garrison at Jalo had been warned and reinforced which easily repelled the attack on the night 15–16 September.

== Attack and withdrawal ==
Captain Preston John Hurman RASC commanding a company of SDF, discusses the approach the attack and withdrawal in his war memories held by the Imperial War Museum. He mentions that in September 1942 they were to make a raid on Jalo, an oasis two hundred and fifty miles south of Barce, crossing the desert for eight hundred to a thousand miles. They gathered at Kufra. They then built up considerable supplies in Kufra and from there Hurman had the job of setting up a further dump en- route for Jalo. The attack began, lined up on a slight rise, then tearing down in extended formation firing like mad. During the previous night, part of our force had got around the back of the fort, but the Italian garrison put up quite a lot of resistance . Unfortunately, we lost several men and never actually captured the fort but we kept it immobilised until the other raids were over. We were ordered to withdraw and made as many miles as we could through the night until we came to a wadi where we could hide up. As I reckoned that the German aircraft would be out looking for us at first light, I ordered that a couple of broken-down vehicles should be towed out as a decoy beyond the wadi ahead. They were put facing towards the way we were heading. Then, cutting some brushwood, we covered our tyre tracks. All the other vehicles were carefully concealed in the sides of the wadi, with camouflage netting and scrub (even rubbing oil and then sand on any windscreens or shiny parts that might catch the sun and give away our position). at first light the planes came over, thundering down at zero feet, up and down the length of the wadi, searching for us and then on, bombing the broken-down trucks to bits. They then flew on southwards looking for us. It was very satisfying to see the plan work so well. Captain Hurman was mentioned in dispatches for his efforts.
