= Ronald Joseph Moore =

New Zealand soldier during World War II

Ronald Joseph Moore DCM (10 September 1915 – 15 August 1992) was a New Zealand soldier during World War II. He was the leader of 'Moore's March', a forced march through the Western Desert by survivors of a Long Range Desert Group patrol following the Battle of Kufra (1941).

He was a farmhand, born on 19 September 1915 in Te Aroha, Waikato, New Zealand, and died on 15 August 1992.

== Military service ==
During the Battle of Kufra at Gebel Sherif on 31 January 1941, Moore's Long Range Desert Group patrol was ambushed by the Italian Auto-Saharan Company, and posted missing, believed killed. The patrol lost their rations, headgear and footwear when the trucks were destroyed in the initial attack. Moore then led a forced march with three other survivors through the Western Desert on an attempted 290 mi (470 km) trek to the nearest allied camp: the other soldiers were Guardsman John Easton, Guardsman Alexander Winchester, and RAOC fitter Alfred Tighe. They had no other supplies, except a two-gallon tin of water and a 2 lb (0.91 kg) jar of jam. An Italian prisoner with them escaped. They found Sarra abandoned and headed for Kufra. Tighe, who had been left behind on the fifth day of their march, was picked up by a Free French patrol four days later, and was able to inform them of the survival and direction of the others. A French patrol plane was sent out and spotted the small groups, airdropping food and a bottle of lemonade: the survivors did not notice the food, and only 0.5 in (13 mm) of lemonade survived the drop. A search party found the group on the 12th day. Easton was injured in the throat and later died, the first Scots Guardsman to die in North Africa. Winchester was semi-delirious. When the patrol found Moore he was clear-headed and uninjured, except for shrapnel in his foot from the Battle of Kufra. He was headed for Tekro 80 mi (130 km) away, barefooted, and slightly annoyed at being stopped as he calculated his was only two days march from his goal.

Moore, who was known as "Skin" Moore, was Trooper No 1248 in the 2 New Zealand Divisional Cavalry. On 22 April 1941, he was awarded the Distinguished Conduct Medal (DCM) for his actions in North Africa, although the citation reads "in recognition of gallant and distinguished services in the Middle East": he was the first member of the New Zealand Division to receive the award in World War II. He was also mentioned in dispatches.
