= Operation Agreement =

Allied amphibious operation against Tobruk in World War II

- Part of the Western Desert campaign and the Battle of the Mediterranean of the Second World War
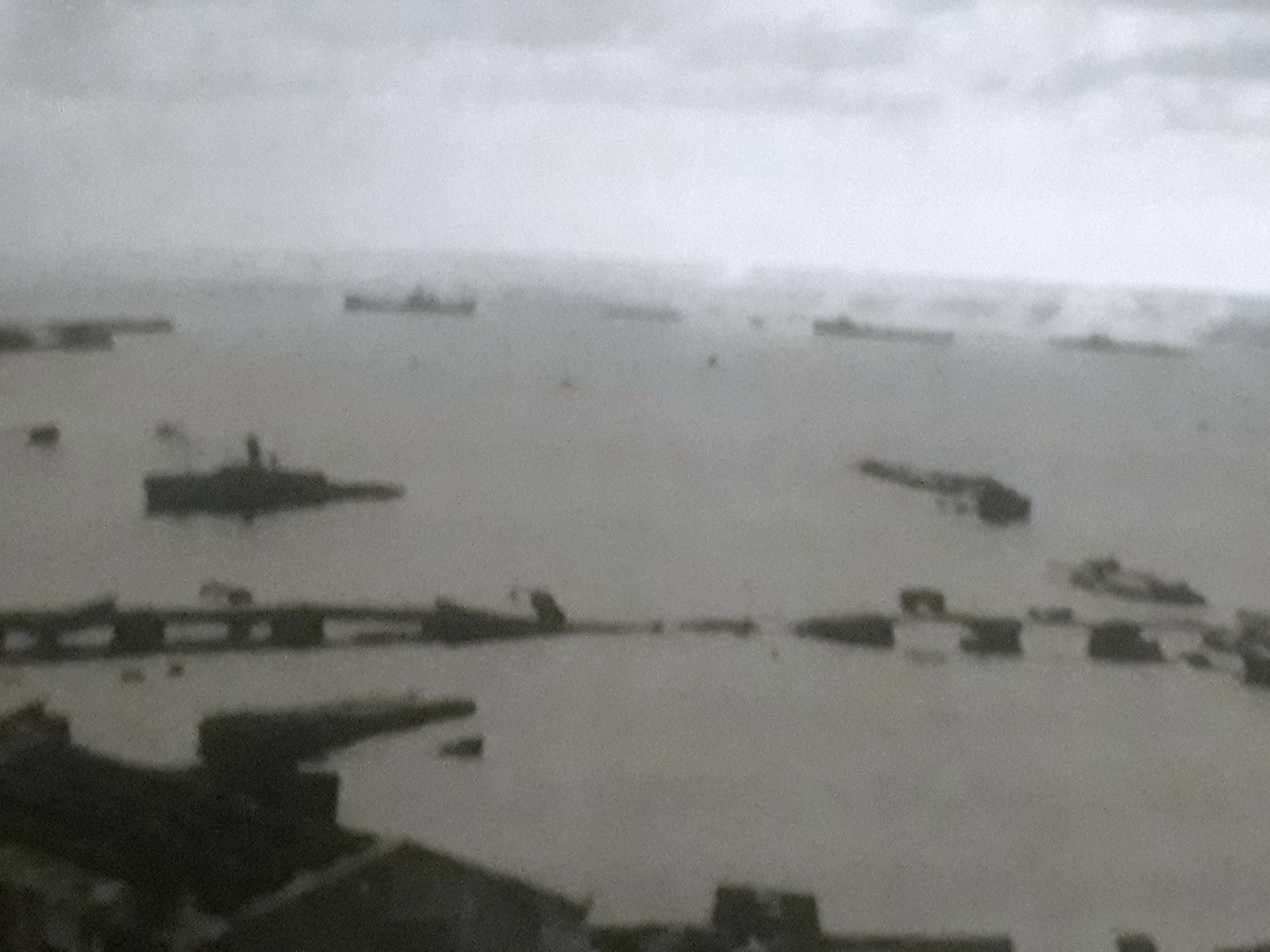
- The Italian torpedo boats Castore and Montanari (top right) firing upon British MTBs and MLs at Tobruk harbour, 14 September 1942
Date	13–14 September 1942
Location	Tobruk, Italian Libya 32.095°N 23.932°E
Result	Axis victory

Belligerents
United Kingdom: Southern Rhodesia; New Zealand	Italy; Germany

Commanders and leaders
(United Kingdom) John Haselden †	(Fascist Italy) Giuseppe Lombardi

Strength
~650–700 marines and soldiers; 1 cruiser; 6 destroyers; 16 MTBs; 3 motor launches; 30 landing craft; 1 submarine	250–300 Italians; 30 Germans; 78 guns (48 Italian and 30 German); 3 torpedo boats; 3 R boats; 8 MFPs (4 Italian and 4 German)

Casualties and losses
800 killed and 576 captured; 1 cruiser; 2 destroyers; 4 MTBs; 2 MLs; Several landing craft	15 Italians and 1 German killed; 43 Italians and 7 Germans wounded; 30 aircraft

Operation Agreement was a ground and amphibious operation carried out by British, Rhodesian and New Zealand forces on Axis-held Tobruk from 13 to 14 September 1942, during the Second World War. A Special Interrogation Group party, fluent in German, took part in missions behind enemy lines. Diversionary actions extended to Benghazi (Operation Bigamy), Jalo oasis (Operation Nicety) and Barce (Operation Caravan). (Note: Daffodil, Snowdrop, Tulip and Hyacinth were fictitious code names, made up by the author of a book published in 1945, when the official names of the operations were secret and which came into general use.) The Tobruk raid was an Allied disaster; the British lost several hundred men killed and captured, one cruiser, two destroyers, six motor torpedo boats and dozens of small amphibious craft.

== Background ==
The objective of Operation Agreement was to undermine the Axis war effort in North Africa by destroying airfields, harbour facilities, supply ships, vehicles and large oil stores. The Allies also intended to capture Jalo oasis, which was to be used as a rendezvous for the retreating ground forces involved in the other operations.

== Course ==
=== Prelude ===
G1 and T1 patrols of the Long Range Desert Group (LRDG) with 50 men, 12 light trucks and five jeeps assaulted Barce airfield and the main barracks, destroying 16 aircraft and damaging seven more. In the attack on the barracks, the LRDG lost four men and two vehicles. Near Zaptié the LRDG force was intercepted by an Italian motorised company with all but two lorries damaged or destroyed. The lorries were loaded with the most seriously injured, while the others went on foot for 99 mi (160 km). The Italians took seven New Zealanders and three Rhodesians prisoner, all injured. After a year, four of the New Zealanders were able to escape. Lieutenant Colonel David Stirling and a party of the Special Air Service, supported by S1 and S2 patrols of the LRDG, were to attempt a big raid on Benghazi but after running late, their presence was discovered after a clash at a roadblock as dawn broke. With the element of surprise lost and the protection of darkness receding, Stirling ordered a withdrawal. The attack on Jalo Oasis was carried out by the Sudan Defence Force and S1 and S2 patrols of the LRDG. The first attack on the night of 15/16 September, was easily repelled by the defenders, who were on the alert and had been reinforced. The attackers withdrew on 19 September as an Italian relief column approached the oasis.

=== Main attack ===
Operation Agreement involved an amphibious force of about 400 Royal Marines, 180 infantry from the Argyll and Sutherland Highlanders (Captain Norman MacFie), 14 Platoon, Z Company, 1 Battalion, Royal Northumberland Fusiliers (Lieutenant Ernest Raymond) and around 150 SAS including several members of the Special Interrogation Group (Lt. Col. John Edward Haselden) approaching from the desert, infiltrating via deception with the Special Interrogation Group operatives posing as German guards and while rest of the force acted as Allied prisoners. The amphibious force was split into Force A, supported by destroyers and intended to land the marines on the peninsula north of Tobruk, while Force C, composed of coastal units, was directed towards an inlet east of Tobruk harbour. Force B captured several positions including an Italian 152 mm coastal battery but it was retaken by Italian marines from the San Marco Battalion. After initially holding off Italian counterattacks the commandos were forced to retreat. Haselden was killed in action while covering the retreat. Most of the shore batteries and positions remained in Axis hands.

==== Force A ====
Force E, a group of commandos from the submarine HMS Taku failed to set up beacons on the shore to guide the main British force, due to the bad sea conditions. The garrison had been reinforced and the destroyers HMS Sikh and Zulu bringing in the seaborne troops landed them on the wrong beach, far to the west of the intended landing place. The British destroyer Sikh, which led the landing attempt, was hit by Italian 152 mm (6-inch) shore batteries and German 88 mm anti-tank guns, while taking on troops. Zulu had gone to the rescue but was unable to pull Sikh clear and it eventually sank; 122 members of the crew were reported killed and the survivors, most of them rescued from the water by the retreating amphibious boats, were eventually taken prisoner. On the afternoon of 14 September, while returning to Alexandria, HMS Coventry was badly damaged by German Junkers Ju 87 "Stuka" dive-bombers from Crete and 63 crew were killed. Coventry was scuttled by Zulu which was hit by German Ju 87 and Junkers Ju 88 dive-bombers a little later. While under tow and 100 nmi (120 mi; 190 km) from Alexandria, Zulu sank, with the loss of 39 crew.

==== Force C ====
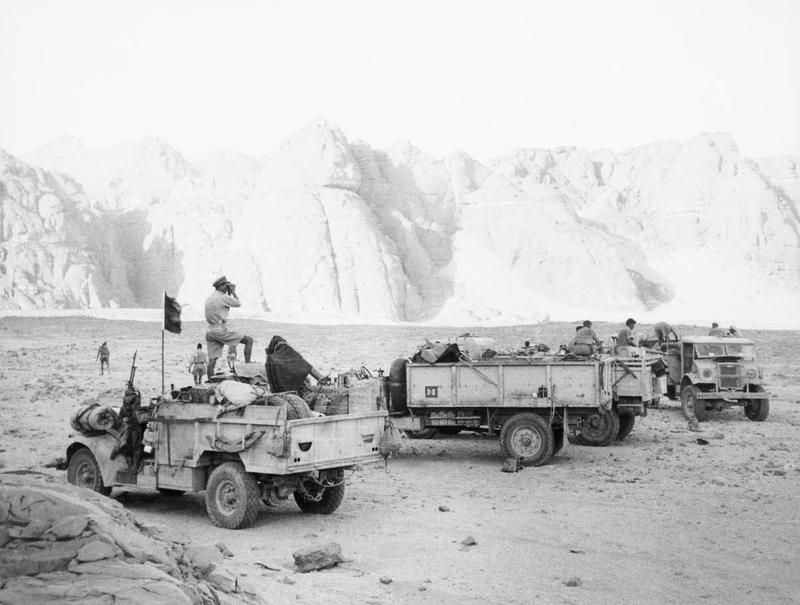
LRDG/SAS in trucks halted at the rock outcrop of Gilf Kebir during Operation Agreement

Another landing by motor launches and boats, carrying the Highlanders and Fusiliers (part of Hammer Force, whose Vickers MMGs were to defend the perimeter) failed to reach the landing point. Because of the massed fire from Tobruk harbour, only MTB 261 and MTB 314, made it into Marsa Umm el Sciausc, the target cove. MTB 314 was stranded in the shallow water but MTB 261 managed to land Sergeant 'Dusty' Miller and a group of Fusiliers and sail out. The motor launches ML 353, ML 352 and ML 349 and 17 MTBs were beaten back by boom defences and an Italian flotilla of torpedo boats and Motozattera (armed motor barges).

Three MTBs launched torpedoes at the naval vessels in harbour, to no avail. ML 353 was set on fire and scuttled, either hit by the Italian warships or strafed by Italian Macchi C.200 fighters, while ML 352, MTB 308, MTB 310 and MTB 312 were lost to Axis aircraft. MTB 314, the motor torpedo boat that was damaged and run aground during the battle, was captured by the German harbour minesweeper R-10 at dawn, with 117 seamen and soldiers on board. Although they were dive-bombed and strafed during their return journey, most of the infantry-carrying MTBs reached Alexandria.

== Aftermath ==
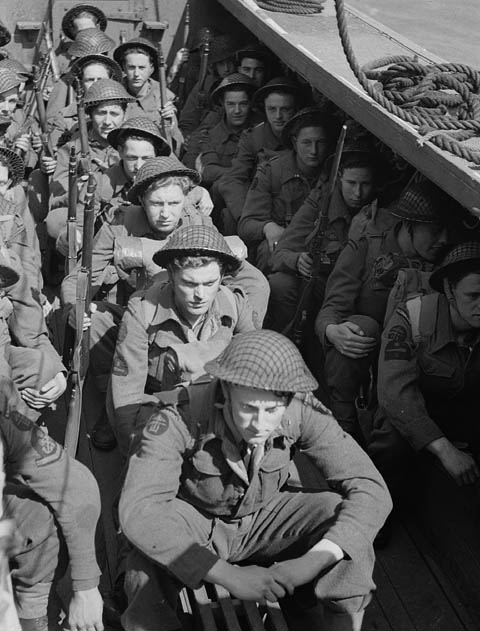
British commandos during a training exercise 9 May 1944

Dozens of British sailors and marines were rescued from the sea and taken prisoner by the Italian torpedo boats Castore, Generale Carlo Montanari, the armed tug Vega, a flotilla of German harbour minesweepers and several German and Italian motor barges. A number of makeshift motor amphibious craft, stragglers from Force A, attempting to reach Alexandria at very low speed, were also captured with their crews. The commander of Sikh, Captain John Micklethwait, was taken prisoner when an Italian motor barge seized one of the Royal Marines' motor boats and the two lighters the vessel was towing. A dinghy manned by the survivors of ML 352 following the same escape route was caught by Castore at midday. Losses amounted to about 300 Royal Marines, 160 soldiers, 280 sailors, the anti-aircraft cruiser Coventry, the destroyers Sikh and Zulu, two motor launches, four MTBs and several small amphibious craft. The Royal Marines suffered 81 killed and the Navy suffered the loss of another 217 men in the ship sinkings; about 576 survivors were taken prisoner. Axis losses were 15 Italians and one German killed, 43 Italians and seven Germans wounded.

== See also ==
- List of British military equipment of World War II
- List of German military equipment of World War II
- List of Italian Army equipment in World War II
- North African campaign timeline
- Battle of the Mediterranean
- List of World War II battles
- British Commandos
