= Edward Cecil Mitford =

British Army officer (1908–2002)

- Born: 20 November 1908; London, England
- Died: 16 July 2002 (aged 94); Mitford, Northumberland, England
- Military career
- Allegiance: United Kingdom
- Branch: British Army
- Service years: 1936−1966
- Rank: Brigadier
- Nickname: "Teddy"
- Service number: 41253
- Unit: Royal Tank Regiment
- Commands: A Squadron, Long Range Desert Group; 1st Royal Tank Regiment; 6th Royal Tank Regiment; 3rd Royal Tank Regiment; 5th Royal Tank Regiment; 66th Training Regiment; 4th Armoured Brigade, Arab Legion
- Conflicts: Arab revolt in Palestine; Second World War
- Awards: Military Cross

Brigadier Edward Cecil Osbaldeston Mitford, MC (20 November 1908 – 16 July 2002) was a British officer in the British Army during the Second World War and after. He was an explorer of the Sahara desert before the war which was instrumental in his becoming one of the original members of the Long Range Desert Group. He later commanded five armoured regiments (three in action) and an armoured brigade. He was also a member of the Mitford family from Northumberland.

== History ==
=== Early life ===
Born in London on 20 November 1908, Edward Cecil Osbaldeston Mitford was the son of an officer in the British Indian Army. He was educated at the Haileybury and Imperial Service College and the Royal Military College, Sandhurst. After graduating from Sandhurst he was commissioned into the 3rd Battalion, Royal Tank Corps. In the 1930s Mitford was one of several young army officers who started exploring the interior of the Libyan Desert. He learned to speak Arabic and was involved in the development of the sun compass. He was posted to Palestine in 1936 during the Arab revolt in Palestine. In the following year he married his first wife Margaret Greaves.

=== Second World War ===
Serving in Egypt with the 7th Armoured Division at the start of the Second World War in September 1939, Mitford was approached by a friend and fellow explorer, Major Ralph Bagnold, and asked to join a new unit he was forming. Bagnold knew Mitford was one of the few Englishmen who had been to Kufra. Bagnold had been given permission from General Sir Archibald Wavell, Commander-in-Chief (C-in-C) of Middle East Command in Alexandria to form the Long Range Desert Group (LRDG) or as it was then called the Long Range Patrol.

Mitford was promoted to captain and in September 1940, during the Italian invasion of Egypt, led his LRDG patrol 200 miles (320 km) from Cairo deep into Libya on their first reconnaissance mission. The patrol crossed the Libyan Desert to the Jalo oasis and Kufra. It raided two enemy emergency landing grounds, destroying unguarded aircraft and a considerable amount of aviation spirit and a supply convoy carrying petrol and official mail. The effectiveness of this first patrol was reflected by the Italians having to reduce their front line forces, and reinforce the troops garrisoning the area, from 2,900 men to 5,500 by November 1940. The first patrol was followed by another in November. Mitford's patrol was operating close to Uweinat when it was spotted by an Italian bomber. Caught in the open, the patrol was bombed for more than an hour. The next day, Mitford led an attack on an Italian post at Ain Dua, engaging it with the patrol's Bofors 37 mm and killing a number of the garrison without loss to the patrol. For his actions during these first patrols Mitford was awarded the Military Cross.

In 1941, Mitford was promoted to major and given command of A Squadron, LRDG, which at the time comprised 'G' (Guards) and 'Y' (Yeomanry) patrols. The squadron's main task was to keep a watch on the German and Italian southern flank. In March 1941 Mitford led his squadron into Cyrenaica with the intention of establishing a new forward operating base for the LRDG at Siwa oasis. En route they located a track that was the main axis for the German and Italian advance on Tobruk.

In 1942 Mitford was posted to command the 1st Battalion Royal Tank Regiment (1 RTR) during the battle of Alam el Halfa and the first and second battles of El Alamein. Afterwards he was given command of 6 RTR. In 1943 he was posted to the 22nd Armoured Brigade as second in command. After attending the Staff College at Haifa, he served in staff appointments in Sicily and Cyprus. He was then given command of his third regiment, 3 RTR, in Northwest Europe which saw action in the Netherlands and the Ardennes, ending the war on the Elbe River.

=== Post war ===
After the war, Mitford served with the occupation forces in Germany before returning to England to command the 66th Training Regiment at Catterick Garrison. This was followed by a staff appointment as GSO1 in Ankara and his final regimental command, 5 RTR, which at the time was stationed in Germany. His next command was the 4th Armoured Brigade of the Arab Legion. He led the brigade until 1956. The following year, Mitford returned to Ankara as the military attache at the British Embassy. He then served as the military assistant to the Commander-in-Chief, Eastern Command, until he finally retired from the army in 1966.

Mitford then returned to his family home in Mitford, Northumberland. In 1949 he had remarried, this time to Patricia Kirrage, who would predecease him in 1993. Both of his marriages were childless. In 1970, after the death of his father, he inherited the 4000 acre family estate at Mitford. Mitford worked to support the local community and raised money for the church before he died on 16 July 2002.
