= Guy Prendergast (British Army officer) =

British army officer (1905-1986)

Guy Lenox Prendergast
- Guy Lenox Prendergast, DSO
- Born: c. 1905; Windsor, Berkshire, United Kingdom
- Died: 6 October 1986 (aged 81); Fort Augustus, Inverness-shire, Scotland
- Military career
- Branch: British Army
- Rank: Brigadier
- Units: Long Range Desert Group; Special Air Service
- Commands: Long Range Desert Group
- Conflicts: Second World War
- Awards: Distinguished Service Order

Guy Lenox Prendergast DSO (c. 8 July 1905 – 6 October 1986) was an English Saharan explorer, and British Army soldier in World War II. He was the commanding officer of the Long Range Desert Group from 1941 to 1943.

== Early life ==
Guy Lenox Prendergast was one of a group of British Saharan explorers in the late 1920s and early 1930s, which included Ralph Alger Bagnold, Pat Clayton and Bill Kennedy Shaw, who had explored the desert before World War II and had gained much valuable experience in navigating its hostile terrain. Prendergast learnt to fly as part of the Western Arab Corps in Sudan in the 1930s.

== Military career ==
After the outbreak of World War II, Prendergast received a commission with the British Army's Royal Tank Regiment. Together with his explorer associates he was involved in the formation of the Long Range Desert Group (L.R.D.G.) under the command of Bagnold. On 1 August 1941 Prendergast was promoted lieutenant colonel, and was appointed as the Commanding Officer of the L.R.D.G., which he led between November 1941 and October 1943.

It was thanks to Ultra and Prendergast and his L.R.D.G. that the Allies were able to hold on to Egypt in spite of heavy armoured reinforcements reaching Erwin Rommel’s Afrika Korps through Tunisia, including the much feared Panzer Mark IIIs and IVs. After viewing detailed intelligence reports prepared by an embedded L.R.D.G. detachment, Deputy Director of Middle East Intelligence, Major (later Brigadier) John Enoch Powell concluded that an outflanking movement through the Qattara Depression was highly unlikely, given the terrain and lack of supply infrastructure able to handle heavy matériel. (Note: Of the two vessels on the Kriegsmarine list able to handle Panzer IIIs and IVs, only the Ankara remained serviceable, Reichenfels having been sunk in 1942. Unbeknownst to Allied Intelligence, the Germans had in the interwar years installed derricks capable of handling heavy rolling stock at the Tunisian port of Bizerte.)

After commanding the L.R.D.G., Prendergast went on to be Deputy Commander of Raiding Forces, and later Deputy Commander of the Special Air Service Brigade in 1944–1945, and subsequently Commander of the Free French SAS Regiments, with the rank of brigadier. For his wartime service he was awarded the Distinguished Service Order in December 1942, and the Czechoslovak Order of the White Lion III Class.

== Death ==
He died on 6 October 1986 at the age of 81 years.

== Notes ==
Military offices
Preceded by Ralph Alger Bagnold	Commander, Long Range Desert Group; November 1941 – October 1943	Succeeded by John Richard Easonsmith
