= David Lloyd Owen =

British Army general (1917–2001)

Major-General David Lloyd Owen CB DSO OBE MC
- Born: 10 October 1917; Hampton, Middlesex, England
- Died: 5 April 2001 (aged 83); Norwich, Norfolk, England
- Military career
- Allegiance: United Kingdom
- Branch: British Army
- Service years: 1938–1972
- Rank: Major-General
- Service number: 74596
- Units: Queen's Royal Regiment (West Surrey)
- Commands: Near East Land Forces; Cyprus District; 24th Infantry Brigade; 1st Battalion, Queen's Royal Regiment (West Surrey); Long Range Desert Group
- Conflicts: Arab revolt in Palestine; Second World War
- Awards: Companion of the Order of the Bath; Distinguished Service Order; Officer of the Order of the British Empire; Military Cross; Mentioned in Despatches (2)

Major-General David Lanyon Lloyd Owen, CB, DSO, OBE, MC (10 October 1917 – 5 April 2001) was a British Army officer and writer. During the Second World War he commanded the Long Range Desert Group.

== Early life and military career ==
Born in Hampton, in the county of Middlesex, England, on 10 October 1917, David Lloyd Owen was the son of Captain Reginald Charles Lloyd Owen. He was educated at Winchester College and the Royal Military College, Sandhurst. Upon passing out from the latter, he was commissioned as a second lieutenant into the Queen's Royal Regiment (West Surrey) on 27 January 1938. He was with the 2nd Battalion of his regiment, then commanded by Lieutenant Colonel Robert Ross, in Palestine during the Arab revolt. Among Lloyd Owen's fellow officers in the battalion was Michael Forrester, another future major general. He later served in the Western Desert from 1939 to July 1941, during the Second World War, when he joined the Long Range Desert Group (LRDG).

== Second World War ==
Lloyd Owen took part in a number of operations, including the SAS raid on Tobruk in August/September 1942, which earned him the Military Cross. He was wounded in an air raid on the LRDG base at Kufra in October 1942 and nearly lost an arm. He rejoined the LRDG in February 1943, when they underwent training in Lebanon before being sent to the Aegean.

Lloyd Owen took command of the LRDG at the end of 1943 after the death of his predecessor Jake Easonsmith during the Battle of Leros. He based himself at Bari in southern Italy from which he mounted a successful raid on Corfu and staged operations in the Dalmatia islands and Yugoslavia. In September 1944, he was parachuted into Albania at night. Shortly after landing he fell 30 ft into a ravine and severely damaged his spine.

Despite being in continual pain, Lloyd Owen directed special forces operations in the mountains for the next three months. Eventually he was evacuated to Italy, was successfully operated on, and told not to return to his former activities. He managed to bluff his way past a medical board and returned to Albania, although this time by boat. The LRDG was eventually disbanded in June 1945. For his leadership in the Balkans, Lloyd Owen was awarded the Distinguished Service Order that year.

== Post-war ==
After the war, Lloyd Owen had various appointments in Britain, including a period on the staff at Sandhurst. In 1952, he was appointed Military Assistant to the High Commissioner in Malaya. He then commanded the 1st Battalion of the Queen's Royal Regiment from 1957 to 1959. In the early 1960s he led the 24th Infantry Brigade Group in Kenya and was then, from 1966 to 1968, General Officer Commanding (GOC), Cyprus District. From 1968 to 1969 he was GOC, Near East Land Forces and, from 1969 to 1972, president of the Regular Commissions Board. He was appointed an Officer of the Order of the British Empire in 1954 and Companion of the Order of the Bath in 1971.

Lloyd Owen wrote two books about his experiences – The Desert My Dwelling Place published by Cassell in 1957 and again by Panther Books the following year, and later Long Range Desert Group 1940–1945: Providence Their Guide, republished by Leo Cooper/Pen and Sword Books in 2001.

== Personal life ==
Lloyd Owen married Ursula Barclay (known as Ursie) and had three sons; Michael, Piers and Christopher.

== Bibliography ==
- Maclean, Fitzroy. Eastern Approaches. Jonathan Cape Ltd.
- Kennedy Shaw, Bill. Long Range Desert Group. Collins.

Military offices
| Preceded by John Richard Easonsmith | Commander, Long Range Desert Group; 1943–1945 | Post disbanded |
