= Guy Prendergast (cricketer) =

English cricketer

Personal information
- Full name: Guy Lushington Prendergast
- Born: 3 August 1806; Bombay, India
- Died: 5 November 1887 (aged 81); Kensington, London

Domestic team information
- Years: Team
- 1826: Cambridge University
- Source: CricketArchive, 22 June 2013

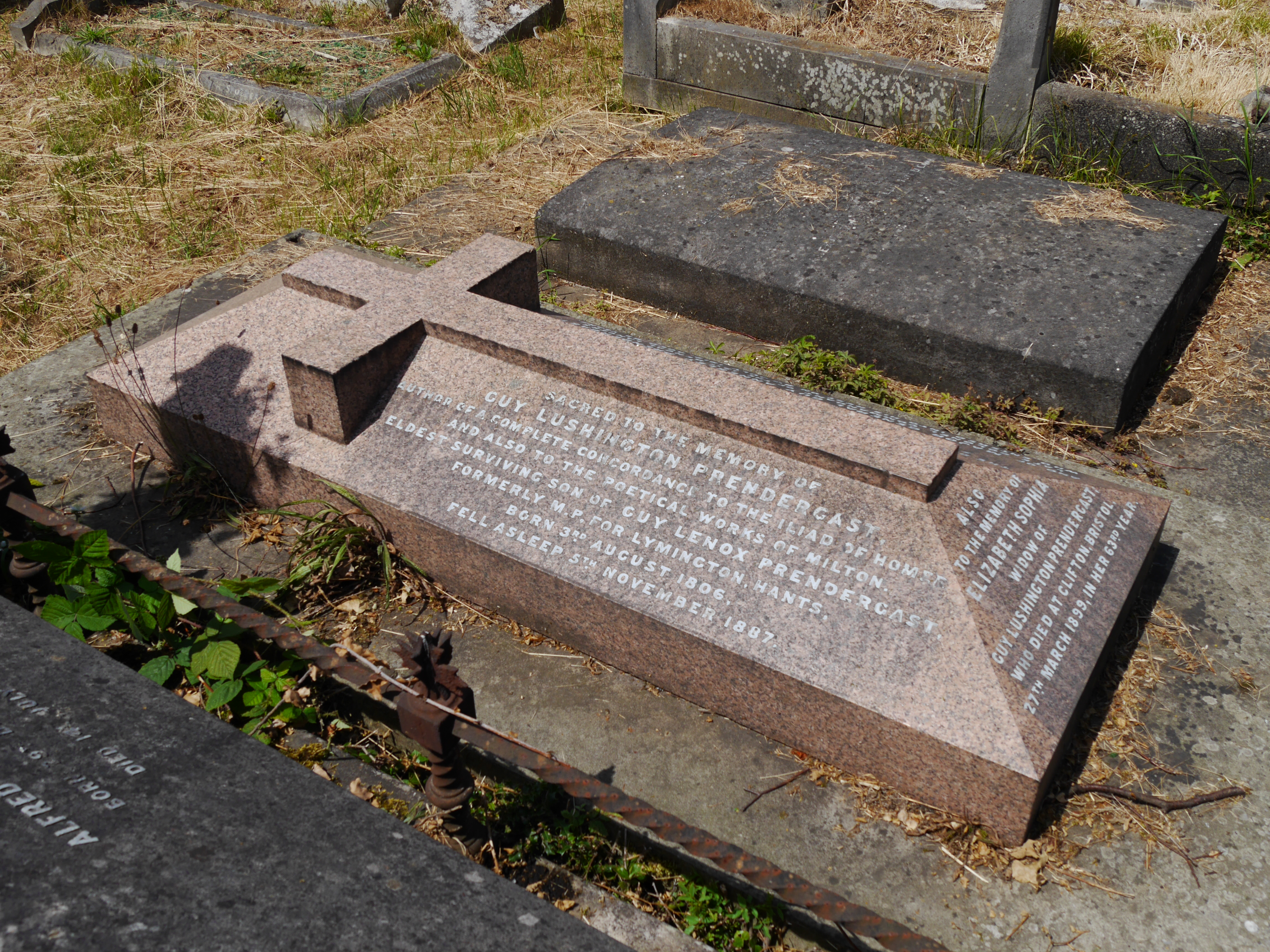
Monument, Kensal Green Cemetery

Guy Lushington Prendergast (3 August 1806 – 5 November 1887) was an English cricketer with amateur status who was associated with Cambridge University. He was recorded in one match in 1826, totalling 0 runs with a highest score of 0 and holding one catch.

He was a son of Guy Lenox Prendergast of the Bombay Civil Service (later MP for Lymington 1826–27). He was educated at Harrow School and Trinity College, Cambridge, but is not recorded to have taken a degree.

In 1857, he published A Complete Concordance to the Poetical Works of Milton and then in 1875 A Complete Concordance to the Iliad of Homer.

He is buried at Kensal Green Cemetery.
