= David Stirling =

Scottish World War II officer, and founder of the Special Air Service

Lieutenant-Colonel Sir David Stirling DSO OBE
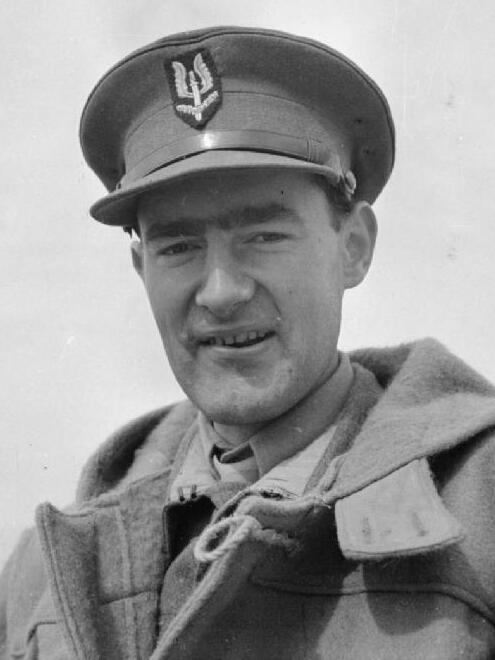
- David Stirling in 1942
- Born: Archibald David Stirling; 15 November 1915; 15 Cambridge Square, London, England
- Died: 4 November 1990 (aged 74); Westminster, London, England
- Burial place: St Cumin's Church, Loch Morar, Scotland
- Education: Trinity College, Cambridge (attended)
- Relatives: Archibald Stirling (father); Bill Stirling (brother)
- Military career
- Allegiance: United Kingdom
- Branch: British Army
- Service years: 1937–1965
- Rank: Lieutenant-Colonel
- Nickname: "The Phantom Major"
- Service number: 72647
- Units: Scots Guards; No. 8 (Guards) Commando
- Commands: Special Air Service
- Conflicts: Second World War; North African campaign; Operation Bigamy; Raid on Sidi Haneish Airfield; Western Front
- Awards: Knight Bachelor; Companion of the Distinguished Service Order; Officer of the Order of the British Empire; Mentioned in Despatches

Lieutenant-Colonel Sir Archibald David Stirling (15 November 1915 – 4 November 1990) was a British Army officer who founded the Special Air Service (SAS).

Born into a Scottish aristocratic family, he was educated at Ampleforth College and briefly attended Trinity College, Cambridge. He was commissioned into the Scots Guards in 1937.

In the Second World War he volunteered for the Commandos and served in the Middle East, where he founded the SAS. Under his leadership, the SAS carried out hit-and-run raids behind the Axis lines of the North African campaign. Known as "The Phantom Major", he was captured in January 1943. He spent the rest of the war in captivity, despite several escape attempts.

Stirling left the Regular Army in 1947. He settled in Rhodesia (now Zimbabwe) and founded the Capricorn Africa Society, which aimed to fight racial discrimination in Africa, calling for equal rights for all civilised. Stirling's preference for a qualified voting franchise over universal suffrage limited the movement's appeal. He formed private military companies and was linked with a failed attempt to overthrow the Libyan leader Muammar Gaddafi in the early 1970s. He tried to organise efforts to undermine trades unionism and to overthrow the British government, none of which made significant headway. He was made a Knight Bachelor in 1990. He died later the same year.

== Early life ==
The National Army Museum records that Stirling was born and raised in Keir House, Perthshire, into an aristocratic Scottish family with a proud military heritage. However, The Scotsman newspaper of 20 November 1915 and The Stirling Observer of 23 November 1915 both published announcements that "The Hon Mrs Keir gave birth to a son on Monday 15th at 15 Cambridge Square, London". The General Records Office (GRO) also records his birth registered in the Paddington district of London.

He was the son of Brigadier-General Archibald Stirling, of Keir, and Margaret Fraser, daughter of Simon Fraser, the Lord Lovat (a descendant of Charles II). Simon Fraser, 15th Lord Lovat was a first cousin. His paternal grandparents were Sir William Stirling-Maxwell, 9th Baronet and Lady Anna Maria Leslie-Melville.

Stirling was educated in England at the Catholic boarding school Ampleforth College alongside his elder brother Bill Stirling. He was part of the Ampleforth Officer Training Corps. He briefly attended Trinity College, Cambridge, before being sent down for 28 transgressions of which the Master of Trinity asked him to select three which would be the "least offensive to his mother". He went to Paris to try unsuccessfully to become an artist.

== Second World War ==
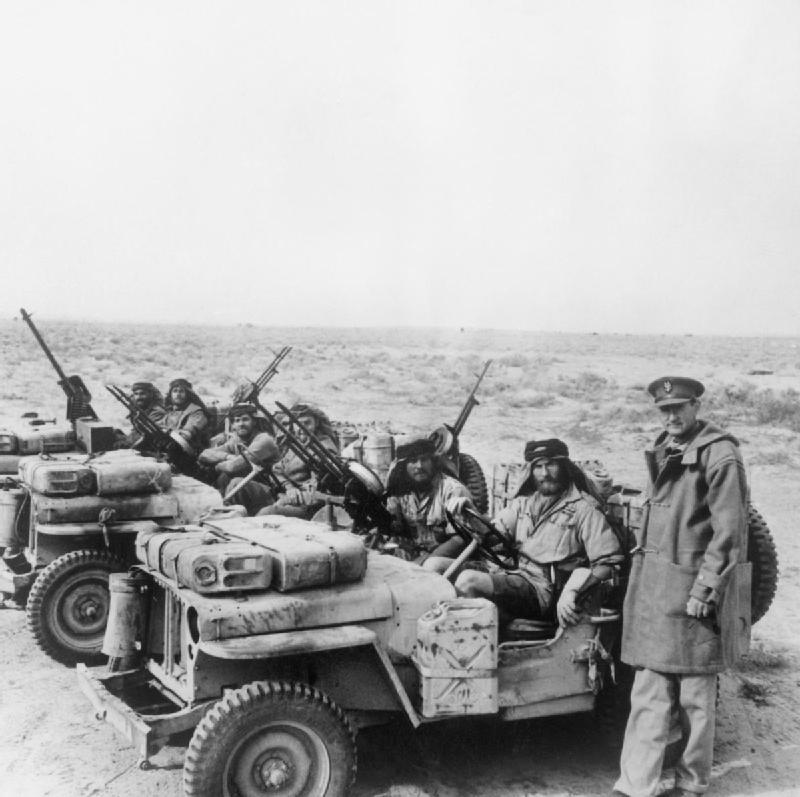
Lieutenant Colonel Stirling with Lieutenant Edward McDonald and other SAS soldiers in North Africa, 1943

Stirling was commissioned into the Scots Guards on 24 July 1937. When the Second World War broke out in September 1939, Stirling was in Montana, USA, working as a cattle-rancher until returning to Britain on SS Manhattan, from New York City to Southampton, on 16 September 1939.

=== Founding of the SAS ===
In June 1940, he volunteered for the new No. 8 (Guards) Commando under Lieutenant-Colonel Robert Laycock, which became part of Force Z (later named "Layforce"). On 1 February 1941, Layforce sailed for the Middle East, in support of the capture of Rhodes, but were soon disbanded after suffering heavy casualties in the Battle of Crete and the Battle of the Litani River. Stirling remained convinced that due to the mechanised nature of war, a small team of highly trained soldiers with the advantage of surprise could attack several targets from the desert in a single night.

A portrait of Major Stirling taken by Cecil Beaton

Believing that taking his idea up the chain of command was unlikely to work, Stirling decided to go straight to the top. On crutches following a parachuting accident, he stealthily entered Middle East headquarters in Cairo (under, through, or over a fence) in an effort to see Commander-in-Chief, Middle East Command General Sir Claude Auchinleck. Spotted by guards, Stirling abandoned his crutches and entered the building, only to come face-to-face with an officer with whom he had previously fallen out. Retreating rapidly, he entered the office of the deputy chief of staff, Major General Neil Ritchie. Stirling explained his plan to Ritchie, immediately after which Ritchie persuaded Auchinleck to allow Stirling to form a new special operations unit. The unit was given the deliberately misleading name "L Detachment, Special Air Service Brigade" to reinforce Dudley Clarke's deception of a parachute brigade existing in North Africa.

=== SAS operations ===
Stirling's new special operations unit was, at the outset, short of equipment (particularly tents and related gear) when the unit set up at Kibrit Air Base. The first operation of the new SAS was to steal from a nearby well-equipped New Zealand regiment various supplies including tents, bedding, tables, chairs and a piano. After at least four trips, they had a well-stocked camp.

After a brief period of training, an initial attempt at attacking a German airfield by parachute landing on 16 November 1941 in support of Operation Crusader proved to be disastrous for the unit. Of the original 55 men, some 34 were killed, wounded or captured far from the target, after being blown off course or landing in the wrong area, during one of the biggest storms to hit the region. Escaping only with the help of the Long Range Desert Group (LRDG) – who were designated to pick up the unit after the attack – Stirling agreed that approaching by land under the cover of night would be safer and more effective than parachuting. As quickly as possible he organised raids on ports using this simple method, bluffing through checkpoints at night using the language skills of some of his soldiers.

Under Stirling's leadership, the Lewes bomb, the first hand-held dual explosive and incendiary device, was invented by Jock Lewes. American jeeps, which were able to deal with the harsh desert terrain better than other transport, were cut down, adapted and fitted with Vickers K machine guns fore and aft. Stirling also pioneered the use of small groups to escape detection. Finding it difficult to lead from the rear, Stirling often led from the front, his SAS units driving through enemy airfields in the jeeps to shoot up aircraft and crew.

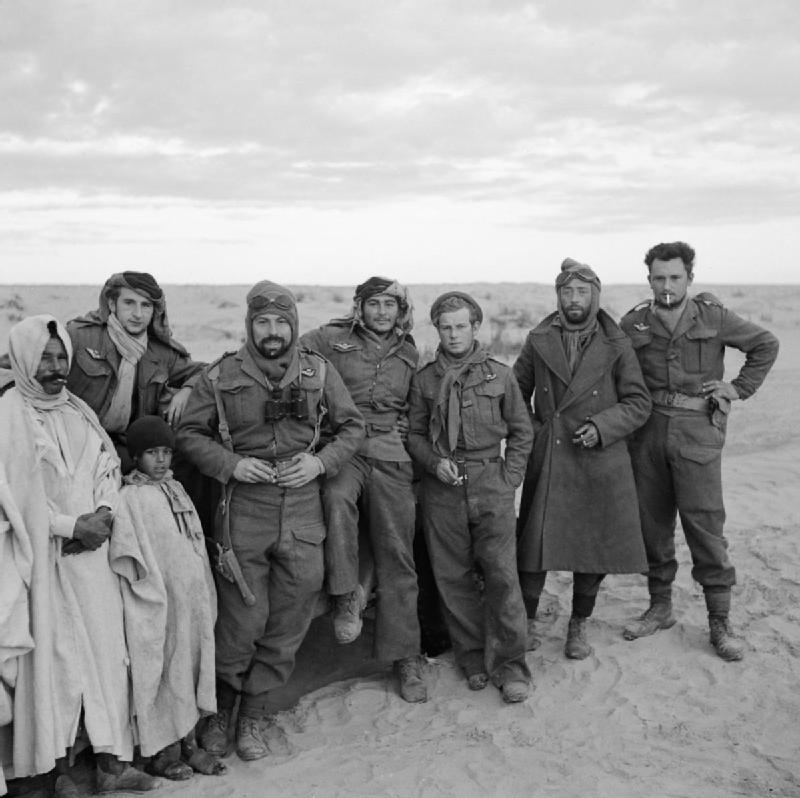
Members of the 'French Squadron SAS' (1ere Compagnie de Chasseurs Parachutistes) in Tunisia. Previously a company of Free French paratroopers, the French SAS squadron were the first of a range of units 'acquired' by Major Stirling as the SAS expanded.

The first jeep-borne airfield raid occurred soon after acquiring the first batch of jeeps in June 1942, when Stirling's SAS group attacked the Italian-held Bagush airfield along with two other Axis airfields all in the same night. After returning to Cairo, Stirling collected a consignment of more jeeps for further airfield raids. His biggest success was on the night of 26–27 July 1942 when his SAS squadron, armed with 18 jeeps, raided the Sidi Haneish landing strip and destroyed 37 Axis aircraft (mostly bombers and heavy transport) for the loss of two men killed. After a drive through the desert, evading enemy patrols and aircraft, Stirling and his men reached the safety of their advance camp at Qaret Tartura on the edge of the Qattara Depression. He was promoted to lieutenant-colonel in September 1942.

In North Africa, in the 15 months before Stirling's capture, the SAS had destroyed over 250 aircraft on the ground, dozens of supply dumps, wrecked railways and telecommunications, and had put hundreds of enemy vehicles out of action.

Field Marshal Bernard Montgomery said "The boy Stirling is quite mad, quite, quite mad. However, in a war there is often a place for mad people.".

=== Capture by Germans ===
These hit-and-run operations eventually proved Stirling's undoing; he was captured during one in Tunisia by the Germans in January 1943 having been dubbed "The Phantom Major" by Field Marshal Erwin Rommel. Although Stirling escaped from the Germans, he was subsequently re-captured by the Italian III Armored Group "Cavalleggeri di Monferrato" and the Italians took great delight in the embarrassment this caused their German allies. He made four further escape attempts, before he was sent to Colditz Castle, where he remained as a prisoner for the rest of the war. He arrived on 20 August 1944 and was given the task of setting up the Colditz British Intelligence Unit by a Stay-Behind Order (SBO) which was in place in the area. Following Stirling's capture, Paddy Mayne took command of the SAS.

== Post-war activities ==
Stirling transferred to the Regular Army Reserve of Officers in 1947. Stirling was granted the honorary rank of Lt. Col as a reservist, a rank that he retained on his retirement in 1965.

=== In Africa ===
Stirling was the founder of the Capricorn Africa Society, promoting freedom from racial discrimination in Africa. Founded in 1949, while much of Africa was still under colonial rule, it had its high point at the 1956 conference at Salima, a social event which sought to enable whites "to relate to Africans on the basis of something approximating social equality". However, because of his opposition to universal suffrage, preferring a qualified voting franchise, educated Africans were divided on it and it attracted insufficient support. Consequently, the society's attempt to deal with the problem of different levels of social development in a non-racial way was ineffective, although it received surprising validation when the South African Communist Party used Stirling's multi-racial elitist model for its 1955 "Congress Alliance" with the African National Congress of South Africa. Stirling resigned as Chairman of the Society in 1959.

=== Libel action ===
In September 1967 Len Deighton wrote an article in The Sunday Times Magazine about Operation Snowdrop, a raid led by Stirling. The following year Stirling was awarded "substantial damages" in a libel action about the article.

=== Mercenary and arms dealer ===
After the war, Stirling organised deals to provide British weapons and military personnel to other countries, such as Saudi Arabia, for various privatised foreign policy operations. Along with several associates, Stirling formed Watchguard International Ltd, initially with offices in Sloane Street (where the Chelsea Hotel later opened), latterly in South Audley Street in Mayfair.

Business was chiefly with the Gulf States. He was linked, along with Denys Rowley, to a failed attempt to overthrow the Libyan ruler Muammar Gaddafi in 1970 or 1971. Stirling was the founder of “private military company” KAS International, also known as KAS Enterprises.

Watchguard International Ltd was a private military company, registered in Jersey in 1965 by Stirling and John Woodhouse. Woodhouse's first assignment was to go to Yemen to report on the state of the royalist forces when a cease-fire was declared. At the same time Stirling was cultivating his contacts in the Iranian government and exploring the chances of obtaining work in Africa. The company operated in Zambia and in Sierra Leone, providing training teams and advising on security matters, but its founders' maverick ways of doing business caused its eventual downfall. Woodhouse resigned as Director of Operations after a series of disagreements and Stirling ceased to take an active part in 1972.

=== Great Britain 75 ===
In mid-1970s, Stirling became increasingly worried that an "undemocratic event" would occur and decided to organise a private army to resist the government takeover. He created an organisation called Great Britain 75 and recruited members from the aristocratic clubs in Mayfair; these were mainly ex-military men, and often former SAS members. The plan was that in the event of civil unrest resulting in the breakdown of normal Government operations, they would take over its running. He described this in detail in an interview from 1974, part of which is featured in Adam Curtis's documentary The Mayfair Set, episode 1: "Who Pays Wins".

In August 1974, before Stirling was ready to go public with GB75, the pacifist magazine Peace News obtained and published his plans. His biographer Alan Hoe disputed the newspaper's disparaging portrayal of Stirling as a right-wing 'Colonel Blimp'.

=== Undermining trade unionism ===
During the mid to late 1970s, Stirling created a secret organisation designed to undermine trade unionism from within. He recruited like-minded individuals from within the trade union movement, with the express intention that they should cause as much trouble during conferences as permissible. One such member was Kate Losinska, who was Head of the Civil and Public Services Association. Funding for this "operation" came primarily from his friend Sir James Goldsmith.

== Honours ==
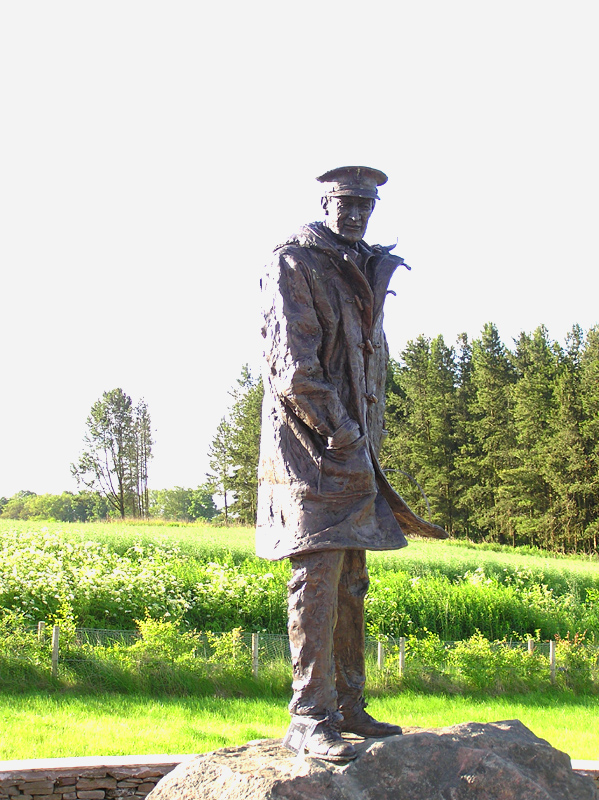
Statue of David Stirling by Angela Conner near Doune, Scotland

Stirling was appointed a Companion of the Distinguished Service Order in recognition of gallant and distinguished service in the Middle East on 24 February 1942, appointed an Officer of the Order of the British Empire in recognition of gallant and distinguished service in the field on 14 November 1946 and appointed a Knight Bachelor in the 1990 New Year Honours for services to the military.

In 1984 the new base of the SAS was renamed Stirling Lines (from Bradbury Lines) in his honour.

In 2002 the SAS memorial, a statue of Stirling standing on a rock, was unveiled on the Hill of Row near his family's estate at Park of Keir. Two bronze plaques were stolen from the statue sometime around the end of May 2014. The current Laird of the Keir estate is his nephew Archie Stirling, a millionaire businessman and former Scots Guards officer.

== In popular culture ==
Stirling was depicted by Connor Swindells in the 2022 television historical drama SAS: Rogue Heroes.

== See also ==
- List of French paratrooper units
