= Operation Bigamy =

British special forces operation in Libya (1942)

- Part of Operation Agreement, the Second World War
Date	14 September 1942
Location	Benina and Benghazi, Cyrenaica, Italian Libya, North Africa 32°4′50″N 20°15′35″E
Result	Axis victory

Belligerents
United Kingdom	Italy; Germany

Commanders and leaders
David Stirling	

Casualties and losses
~70 vehicles	

Operation Bigamy a.k.a. Operation Snowdrop was a raid during the Second World War by the Special Air Service on 14 September 1942. The plan was to destroy the harbour and storage facilities at Benghazi and raid the airfield at Benina in Libya in coordination with the RAF as part of a deception plan for Operation Agreement, the much larger raid on Tobruk.

The plan involved a "gruelling journey around the southern edge of the Great Sand Sea" but ended in failure. The raiding force was discovered at a road block by an Italian reconnaissance unit and Stirling decided to withdraw to Kufra. During the withdrawal, the Luftwaffe picked off nearly 70 of the vehicles on the barren terrain. The survivors were reformed as the 1st Special Air Service regiment.

The frequently used, albeit inaccurate, name "Operation Snowdrop" stems from early editions of William Boyd Kennedy Shaws' book Long Range Desert Group. At the time, War Office security policy would not permit Shaw to use real operational code names.

In September 1967 Len Deighton wrote an article in The Sunday Times Magazine about Operation Snowdrop. The following year Stirling was awarded "substantial damages" in a libel action about the article. The passage complained of states "Stirling himself had insisted upon talking about the raid at two social gatherings at the British Embassy in Cairo although warned not to do so". Stirling made the point that Winston Churchill had been at both gatherings and the issue was raised in a private discussion with the Prime Minister.
