= Bill Kennedy Shaw =

British archaeologist and soldier (1901–1979)

William Boyd Kennedy Shaw OBE (26 October 1901 – 23 April 1979) was a British desert explorer, botanist, archaeologist and soldier. During the Second World War, he served with the British Army's Long Range Desert Group and the Special Air Service Regiment. He was known, variously, as Bill Shaw or Bill Kennedy-Shaw, but preferred the latter form of his name, which he always used in his writings.

== Early life ==
Kennedy-Shaw was born on 26 October 1901, the son of Colonel F. S. Kennedy-Shaw, of King's Orchard, Teffont Magna, Wiltshire. He received his formal education at Radley College.

During the 1920s and 1930s, Kennedy-Shaw played a key role in exploring the Western Desert near the southwestern corner of modern Egypt, drawing on his expertise as a botanist, archaeologist, and navigator. He made four major trips:

During the winter of 1927/1928, Kennedy-Shaw and Douglas Newbold, on leave from the Sudan Government service, travelled the Arba’in slave road from Selima and Bir Natrun, covering 1,000 km by camel. Shaw published observations and photos from the trip in the journal Sudan Notes and Records.

In October 1930, Kennedy-Shaw accompanied Ralph Alger Bagnold on a trip from Cairo to Ain Dalla, into the Sand Sea, past Ammonite hill to the Gilf Kebir, south to Uweinat and on to Wadi Halfa, returning via the Arba'in slave road via Salima oasis, Kharga and then Aysut.

He also travelled with Bagnold in 1932 from Cairo to Kharga, to Uweinat, Sarra, Tekro, Uweinat, El Fasher, Bir Natrun, Merga, Laqia, Selima, Wadi Halfa, Dakhla, Bahariya and back to Cairo, a total distance of 6,000 miles.

In 1935, Kennedy-Shaw set out from Cairo again on 14 January with Colonel G. A. Strutt and Mrs. Strutt, Lieut. R. N. Harding Newman (Royal Tank Corps), M. H. Mason, R. E. McEuen, this time in three Model 46 Ford trucks, first arriving at Gilf Kebir, onto Wadi Halfa, Grassy Valley, El Fasher (in search of medical aid after a serious fall by Colonel Strutt. The remaining party returned to Wadi Hawa for a thorough investigation of the area. Then onto Selima, to Uweinat, into the Sand Sea and through to Siwa before returning to Cairo on 9 April, covering in all about 6300 miles (10140km). Kennedy-Shaw's paper and photographs were presented at the Royal Geographical Society in January 1936 and published in their quarterly journal.

== Second World War ==
After the outbreak of the Second World War, Bagnold recruited Kennedy-Shaw from the British Imperial Mandatory Palestine Administration's office in Jerusalem, where he was employed, to be the Intelligence and Chief Navigation officer for the British Army's new Long Range Desert Group (LRDG) that Bagnold was assembling. Kennedy-Shaw served initially as a lieutenant in the General List. He transferred to the Intelligence Corps in 1940 and to the Special Air Service Regiment in 1944 when the LRDG ceased operations with the conclusion of the North Africa Campaign. He reached the rank of major, being mentioned in despatches during his service.

From 1944 to 1945, he served as the GSO 2 (Intelligence) at the SAS Brigade's Headquarters in the North-West Europe Campaign.

== Post-war life ==
He wrote one of the first books on the LRDG, entitled The Long Range Desert Group (1945), which was subject to pre-publication approval by the War Office who required changes to be made to the text; in particular the codenames of the operations he described and some real names of individuals involved in special operations. He also authored several articles published in the Journal of the Royal Geographical Society. (The Greenhill Military Paperbacks edition of his book contains supplementary notes on his life and has updating amendments to his original text, commissioned by the publisher from authorities on the subject, which notes and explain the original excisions.)

== Death ==
Kennedy-Shaw died on 23 April 1979 at the age of 77 years in Lichfield, Staffordshire.

== Decorations ==
For his services during the War, Kennedy-Shaw received the Order of the British Empire, and was Mentioned in Despatches. He was also awarded the Croix de Guerre (Belgium) 1st Class, the Croix de Guerre (Belgium) with Palm, and the Officer grade of the Order of Oranje-Nassau, with sword, from the Queen of the Netherlands.

== Sources ==
- Long Range Desert Group by Bill Kennedy-Shaw
- Libyan Sands, Travel in a dead world by Ralph Alger Bagnold
- The Long Range Desert Group by David Lloyd Owen
- The Hunt for Zerzura and World War II (about members of the Zerzura Club in World War II) by Saul Kelly
- The Secret Life of László Almásy by John Bierman
