= Bagnold =

Bagnold may refer to:

- Enid Bagnold (1889–1981), author and playwright
- Ralph Bagnold (1896–1990), British Army Officer
  - Bagnold number, a representation of the ratio of stresses within granular flows
  - Bagnold formula, a calculation relating the amount of a wind-blown fluid to wind speed
  - Bagnold Dunes, an extraterrestrial dune field
