= Gearon =

Gearon is a surname. Notable people with the surname include:

- Eamonn Gearon, British author, Arabist, and analyst
- Tierney Gearon (born 1963), American photographer
- Valerie Gearon (1937–2003), Welsh actress
- Rocco Gearon (2009),

Young engineer
