= Bibliography of Aeolian Research =

2015 bibliography on aeolian processes

The Bibliography of Aeolian Research (BAR) is a comprehensive 2015 bibliography focused on the study of the detachment, transport, and deposition of sediments by wind.

Aeolian research is a sub-discipline of the physical sciences that focuses on the activity of the winds, with an emphasis on the winds' ability to interact with and shape the surface of the Earth and other planets. Aeolian research spans a broad array of disciplines and may include the study of aeolian processes and associated aeolian landforms, aeolian deposits, and sedimentary features; the study of wind erosion and its control by tillage, cover crops, shelterbelts, and other management practices; and the study of mineral dust, dust storms and the effects of fine particulate matter on climate and air quality.

An extensive Bibliography of Aeolian Research (BAR) was constructed that contains references to every known scientific manuscript published in the field of aeolian research from 1646 to 2015. The BAR contains over 43,000 bibliographic citations.

As with most bibliographies, the Bibliography of Aeolian Research has benefited from past bibliographies. The BAR lists more than forty-five bibliographies that focus on at least one aspect of aeolian research and parts of these have been incorporated into the BAR. Older bibliographies are especially important because they provide a record of early publications. The oldest bibliography incorporated into the BAR is the Bibliography of Meteorology compiled by Oliver Fassig in 1889. Citations have also been extracted from the Bibliography of Eolian Geology prepared for the United States Department of Agriculture by Conrad Stuntz and Edward Free. Other important bibliographies that have been incorporated into the BAR include two online bibliographies that were maintained by Andrew Warren of University College London titled A Bibliography of Wind Erosion and Related Phenomena and A Bibliography of Desert Dunes and Associated Phenomena. The Bibliography of Aeolian Research contains more citations extracted from these two bibliographies than from any other source. Citations were also obtained from a monthly internet posting called Aeolian Papers of the Month, a list of published papers compiled each month from 1996-2001 by Thomas Gill at the Texas Tech University.

Editors Andrew Warren, John Stout and Thomas Gill collected bibliographic citations by searching databases and extracting citations from recent publications. New entries included citations to scholarly articles, books, theses, dissertations, and reports. Since 2015, citations of new aeolian research publications have been compiled by Gill as 'Dust Storm News' on Twitter.

== See also ==
- Aeolian landform
- Aeolian processes
- Blowout (geology)
- Dune
- Dust devil
- Dust storm
- Haboob
- Loess
- Saltation (geology)
- Ventifact
- Yardang
