= Debris flow =

Geological phenomenon

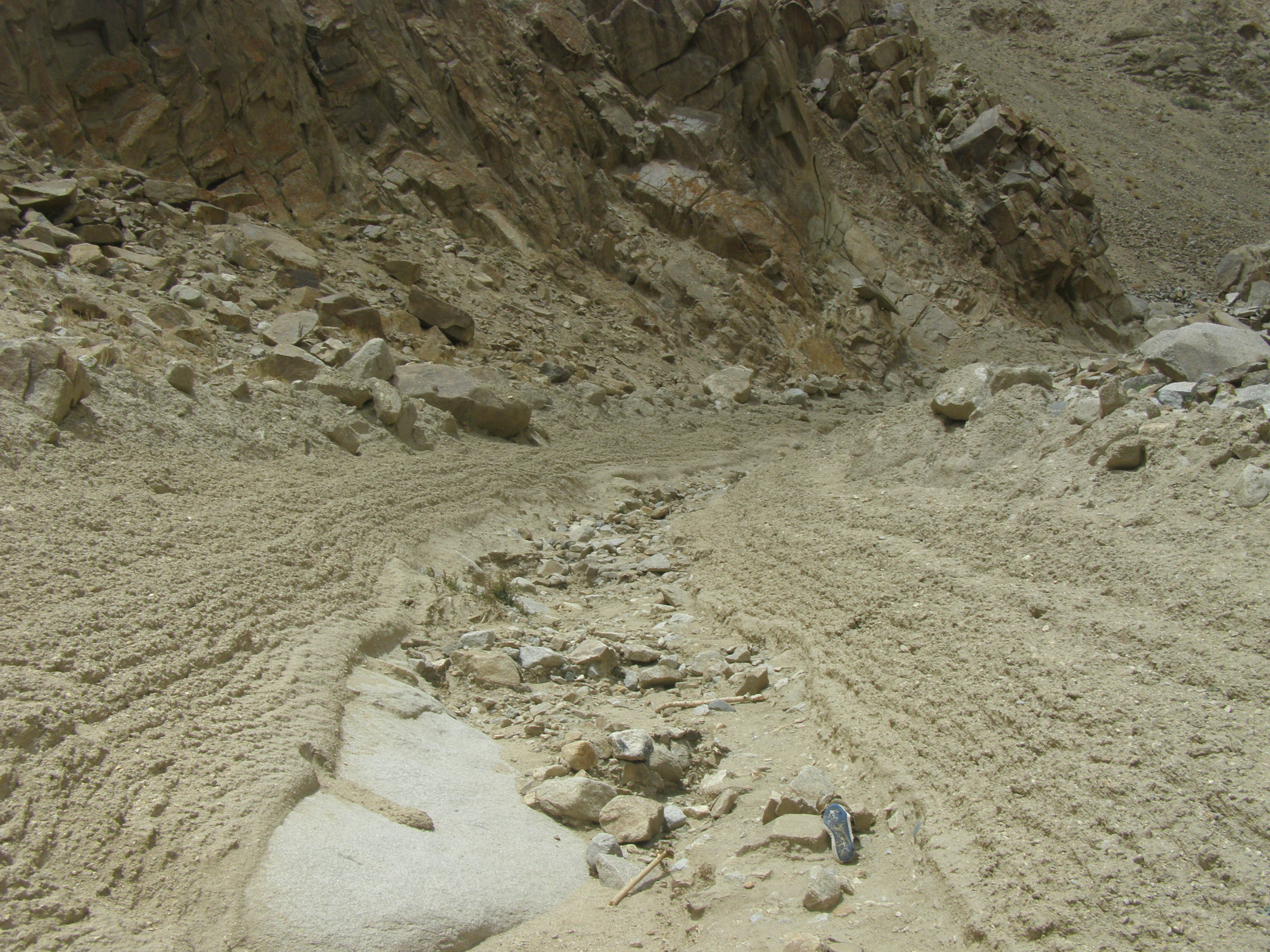
Debris flow channel with deposits left after 2010 storms in Ladakh, NW Indian Himalaya. Coarse bouldery levees form the channel sides. Poorly sorted rocks lie on the channel floor.

Debris flow in Saint-Julien-Mont-Denis, France, July 2013

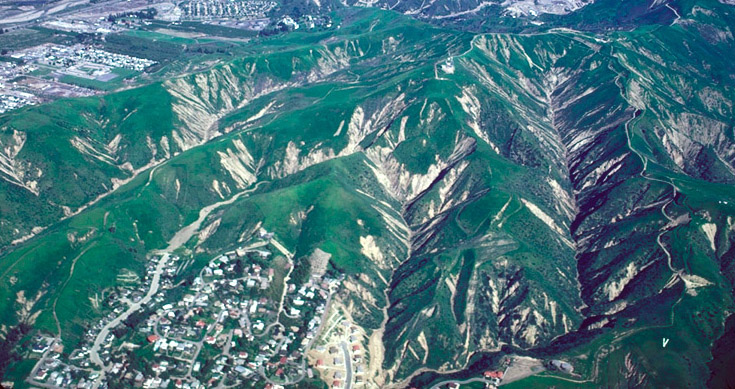
Scars formed by debris flow in Ventura, greater Los Angeles during the winter of 1983. The photograph was taken within several months of the debris flows occurring.

Debris flows are geological phenomena in which water-laden masses of soil and fragmented rock flow down mountainsides, funnel into stream channels, entrain objects in their paths, and form thick, muddy deposits on valley floors. They generally have bulk densities comparable to those of rockslides and other types of landslides (roughly 2000 kilograms per cubic meter), but owing to widespread sediment liquefaction caused by high pore-fluid pressures, they can flow almost as fluidly as water. Debris flows descending steep channels commonly attain speeds that surpass 10 m/s (36 km/h), although some large flows can reach speeds that are much greater. Debris flows with volumes ranging up to about 100,000 cubic meters occur frequently in mountainous regions worldwide. The largest prehistoric flows have had volumes exceeding 1 billion cubic meters (i.e., 1 cubic kilometer). As a result of their high sediment concentrations and mobility, debris flows can be very destructive.

Notable debris-flow disasters of the twentieth century involved more than 20,000 fatalities in Armero, Colombia, in 1985 and tens of thousands in Vargas State, Venezuela, in 1999.

== Features and behavior ==
Debris flows have volumetric sediment concentrations exceeding about 40 to 50%, and the remainder of a flow's volume consists of water. By definition, "debris" includes sediment grains with diverse shapes and sizes, commonly ranging from microscopic clay particles to great boulders. Media reports often use the term mudflow to describe debris flows, but true mudflows are composed mostly of grains smaller than sand. On Earth's land surface, mudflows are far less common than debris flows. However, underwater mudflows are prevalent on submarine continental margins, where they may spawn turbidity currents. Debris flows in forested regions can contain large quantities of woody debris such as logs and tree stumps. Sediment-rich water floods with solid concentrations ranging from about 10 to 40% behave somewhat differently from debris flows and are known as hyperconcentrated floods. Normal stream flows contain even lower concentrations of sediment.

Debris flows can be triggered by intense rainfall or snowmelt, by dam-break or glacial outburst floods, or by landsliding that may or may not be associated with intense rain or earthquakes. In all cases the chief conditions required for debris flow initiation include the presence of slopes steeper than about 25 degrees, the availability of abundant loose sediment, soil, or weathered rock, and sufficient water to bring this loose material to a state of almost complete saturation (with all the pore space filled). Debris flows can be more frequent following forest and brush fires, as experience in southern California demonstrates. They pose a significant hazard in many steep, mountainous areas, and have received particular attention in Japan, China, Taiwan, USA, Canada, New Zealand, the Philippines, the European Alps, Russia, and Kazakhstan. In Japan a large debris flow or landslide is called yamatsunami (山津波), literally mountain tsunami.

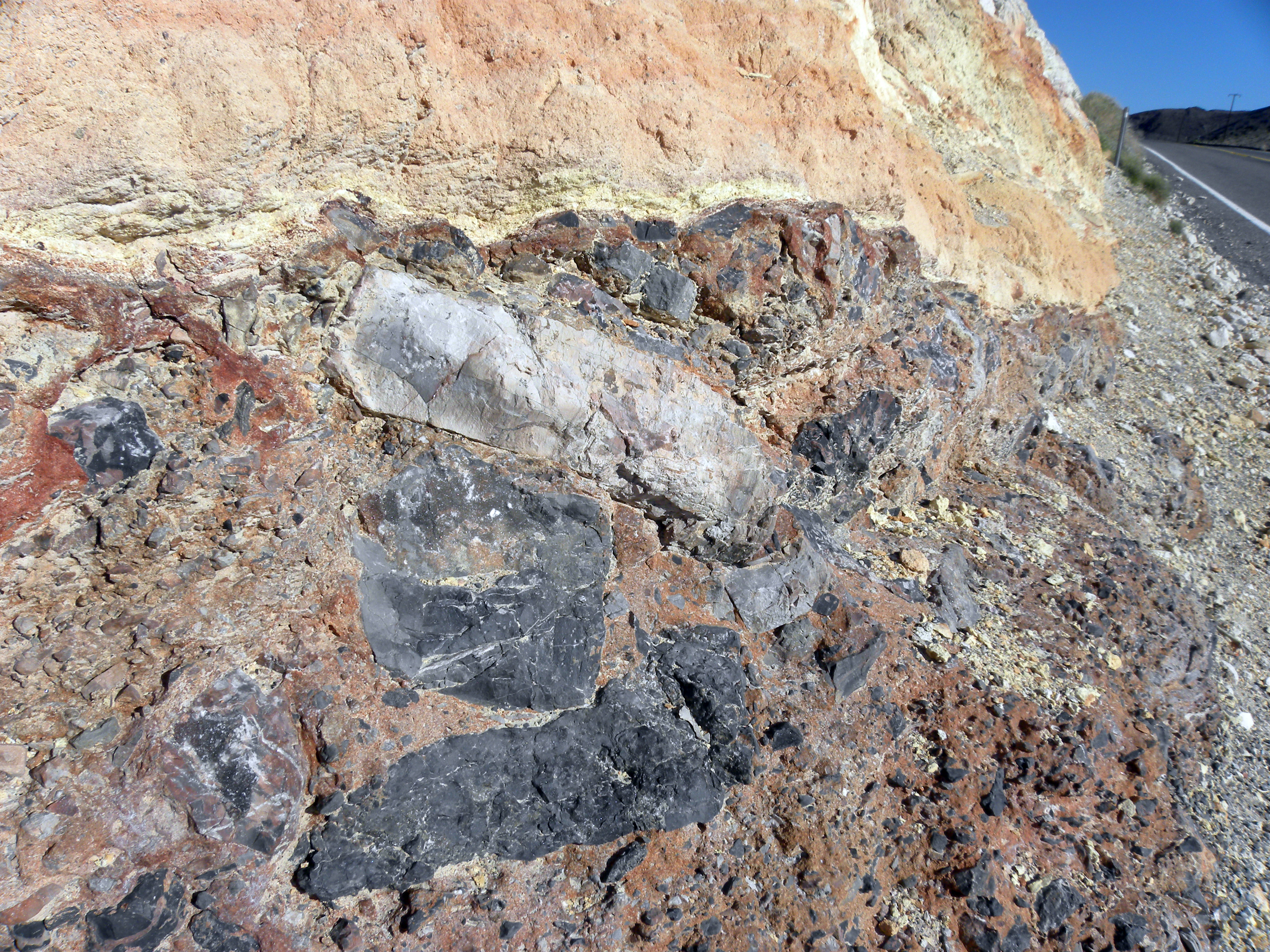
Ancient debris flow deposit at Resting Springs Pass, California

Debris flows are accelerated downhill by gravity and tend to follow steep mountain channels that debouche onto alluvial fans or floodplains. The front, or 'head' of a debris-flow surge often contains an abundance of coarse material such as boulders and logs that impart a great deal of friction. Trailing behind the high-friction flow head is a lower-friction, mostly liquefied flow body that contains a higher percentage of sand, silt and clay. These fine sediments help retain high pore-fluid pressures that enhance debris-flow mobility. In some cases the flow body is followed by a more watery tail that transitions into a hyperconcentrated stream flow. Debris flows tend to move in a series of pulses, or discrete surges, wherein each pulse or surge has a distinctive head, body and tail.

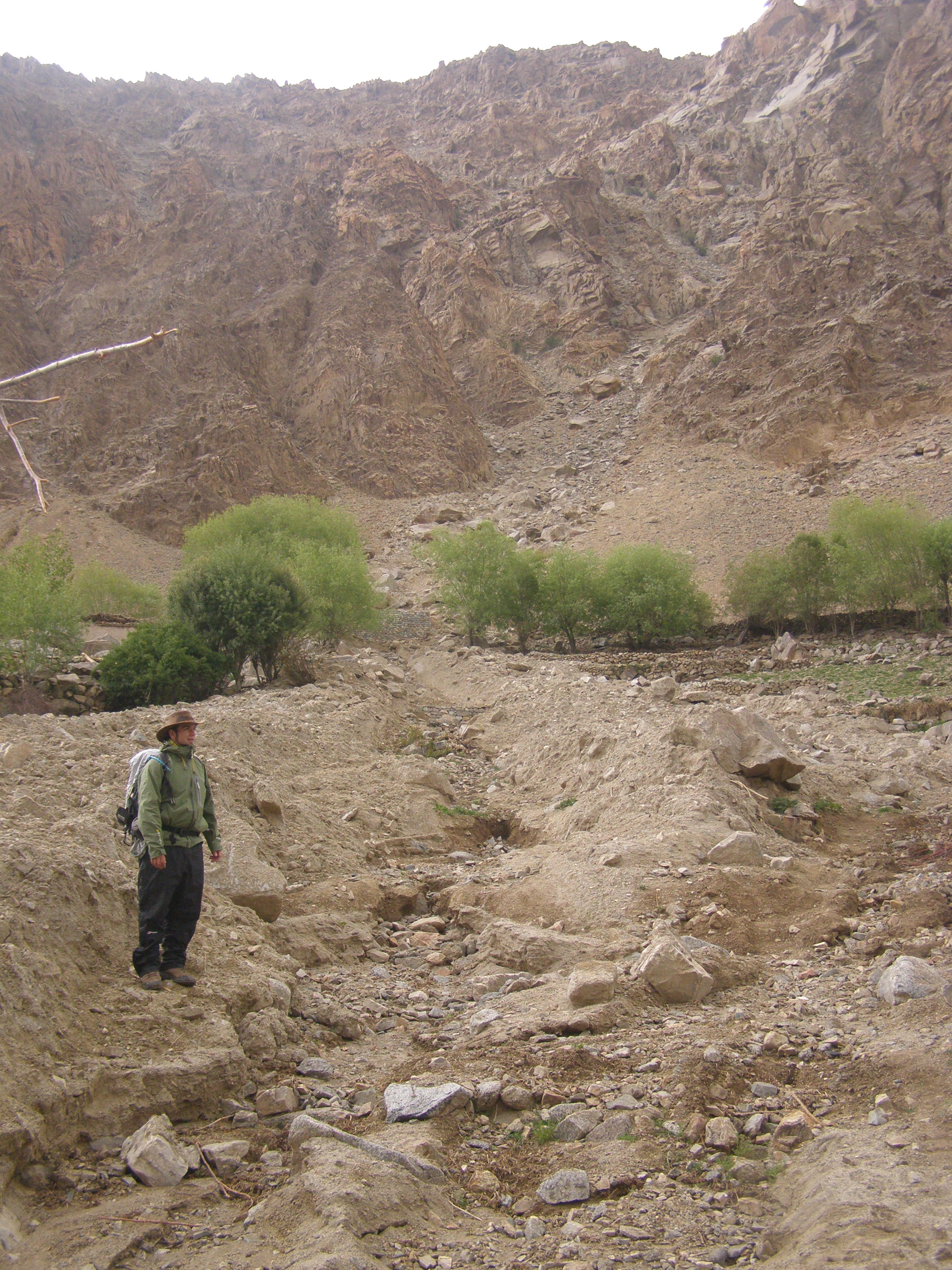
A debris flow in Ladakh, triggered by storms in 2010. It has poor sorting and levees. Steep source catchment is visible in background.

Debris-flow deposits are readily recognizable in the field. They make up significant percentages of many alluvial fans and debris cones along steep mountain fronts. Fully exposed deposits commonly have lobate forms with boulder-rich snouts, and the lateral margins of debris-flow deposits and paths are commonly marked by the presence of boulder-rich lateral levees. These natural levees form when relatively mobile, liquefied, fine-grained debris in the body of debris flows shoulders aside coarse, high-friction debris that collects in debris-flow heads as a consequence of grain-size segregation (a familiar phenomenon in granular mechanics). Lateral levees can confine the paths of ensuing debris flows, and the presence of older levees provides some idea of the magnitudes of previous debris flows in a particular area. Through dating of trees growing on such deposits, the approximate frequency of destructive debris flows can be estimated. This is important information for land development in areas where debris flows are common. Ancient debris-flow deposits that are exposed only in outcrops are more difficult to recognize, but are commonly typified by juxtaposition of grains with greatly differing shapes and sizes. This poor sorting of sediment grains distinguishes debris-flow deposits from most water-laid sediments.

== Types ==
Other geological flows that can be described as debris flows are typically given more specific names. These include:

=== Lahar ===
A lahar is a debris flow related in some way to volcanic activity, either directly as a result of an eruption, or indirectly by the collapse of loose material on the flanks of a volcano. A variety of phenomena may trigger a lahar, including melting of glacial ice, sector collapse, intense rainfall on loose pyroclastic material, or the outburst of a lake that was previously dammed by pyroclastic or glacial sediments. The word lahar is of Indonesian origin, but is now routinely used by geologists worldwide to describe volcanogenic debris flows. Nearly all of Earth's largest, most destructive debris flows are lahars that originate on volcanoes. An example is the lahar that inundated the city of Armero, Colombia in 1985.

=== Jökulhlaup ===
A jökulhlaup is a glacial outburst flood. Jökulhlaup is an Icelandic word, and in Iceland many glacial outburst floods are triggered by sub-glacial volcanic eruptions. (Iceland sits atop the Mid-Atlantic Ridge, which is formed by a chain of mostly submarine volcanoes). Elsewhere, a more common cause of jökulhlaups is the breaching of ice-dammed or moraine-dammed lakes. Such breaching events are often caused by the sudden calving of glacier ice into a lake, which then causes a displacement wave to breach a moraine or ice dam. Downvalley of the breach point, a jökulhlaup may increase greatly in size through entrainment of loose sediment from the valley through which it travels. Ample entrainment can enable the flood to transform to a debris flow. Travel distances may exceed 100 km.

== Theories and models of debris flows ==
Numerous different approaches have been used to model debris-flow properties, kinematics, and dynamics. Some are listed here.

- Rheologically based models that apply to mud flows treat debris flows as single-phase homogeneous materials (Examples include: Bingham, viscoplastic, Bagnold-type dilatant fluid, thixotropic, etc.)
- Dam break wave, e.g. Hunt, Chanson et al.
- Roll wave, e.g., Takahashi, Davies
- Progressive wave
- A type of translating rock dam

Calibrating and validating such sophisticated models require well-documented data from field surveys or minute laboratory experiments.

=== Two-phase ===
The mixture theory, originally proposed by Iverson and later adopted and modified by others, treats debris flows as two-phase solid-fluid mixtures.

In real two-phase (debris) mass flows there exists a strong coupling between the solid and the fluid momentum transfer, where the solid's normal stress is reduced by buoyancy, which in turn diminishes the frictional resistance, enhances the pressure gradient, and reduces the drag on the solid component. Buoyancy is an important aspect of two-phase debris flow, because it enhances flow mobility (longer travel distances) by reducing the frictional resistance in the mixture. Buoyancy is present as long as there is fluid in the mixture. It reduces the solid normal stress, solid lateral normal stresses, and the basal shear stress (thus, frictional resistance) by a factor ($1-\gamma$), where $\gamma$ is the density ratio between the fluid and the solid phases. The effect is substantial when the density ratio ($\gamma$) is large (e.g., in the natural debris flow).

If the flow is neutrally buoyant, i.e., $\gamma = 1$, (see, e.g., Bagnold, 1954) the debris mass is fluidized and moves longer travel distances. This can happen in highly viscous natural debris flows. For neutrally buoyant flows, Coulomb friction disappears, the lateral solid pressure gradient vanishes, the drag coefficient is zero, and the basal slope effect on the solid phase also vanishes. In this limiting case, the only remaining solid force is due to gravity, and thus the force associated with buoyancy. Under these conditions of hydrodynamic support of the particles by the fluid, the debris mass is fully fluidized (or lubricated) and moves very economically, promoting long travel distances. Compared to buoyant flow, the neutrally buoyant flow shows completely different behaviour. For the latter case, the solid and fluid phases move together, the debris bulk mass is fluidized, the front moves substantially farther, the tail lags behind, and the overall flow height is also reduced. When $\gamma = 0$, the flow does not experience any buoyancy effect. Then the effective frictional shear stress for the solid phase is that of pure granular flow. In this case the force due to the pressure gradient is altered, the drag is high and the effect of the virtual mass disappears in the solid momentum. All this leads to slowing down the motion.

== Damage prevention ==
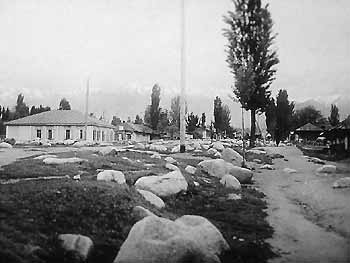
Almaty, Kazakhstan, after the catastrophic debris flow of 1921. A number of facilities, including the Medeu Dam, have been built since to prevent flows of this kind from reaching the city.

To prevent debris flows reaching property and people, a debris basin may be constructed. Debris basins are designed to protect soil and water resources or to prevent downstream damage. Such constructions are considered to be a last resort because they are expensive to construct and require commitment to annual maintenance. Also, debris basins may only retain debris flows from a fraction of streams that drain mountainous terrain.

Before a storm that can potentially nucleate debris flows, forecasting frameworks can often quantify the likelihood that a debris flow might occur in a watershed; however, it remains challenging to predict the amount of sediment mobilized and therefore, the total size of debris flows that may nucleate for a given storm, and whether or not debris basins will have the capacity to protect downstream communities. These challenges make debris flows particularly dangerous to mountain front communities.

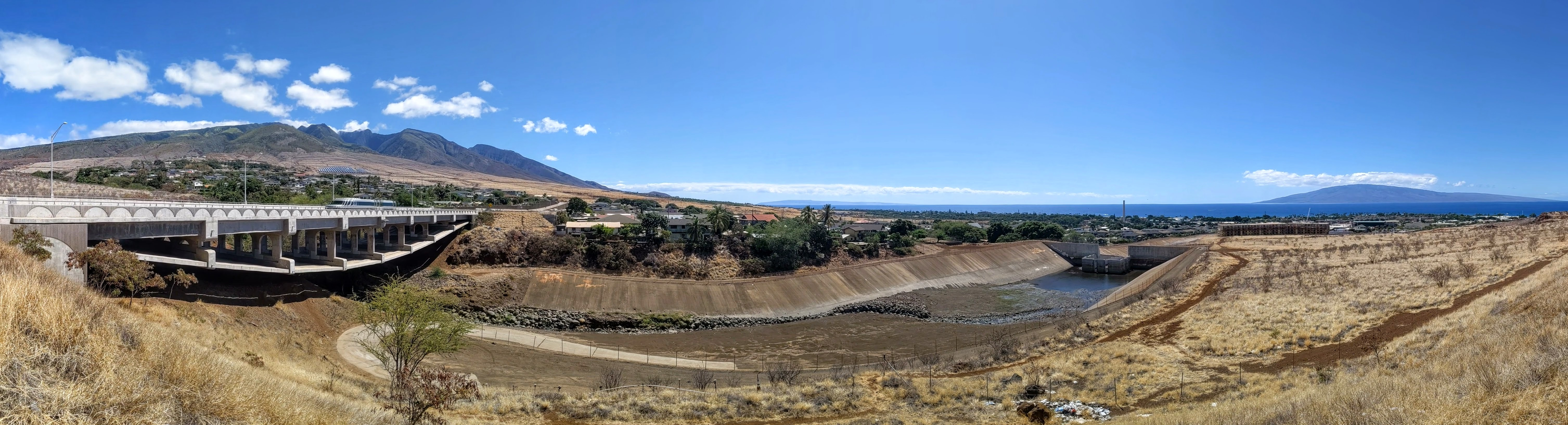
The debris basin on the Kahoma Stream Flood Control Project, protecting the town of Lahaina, Hawaii, (right) from runoff from the mountains (left).

== In popular culture ==
In 1989, as part of his large-scale piece David Gordon's United States, and later, in 1999, as part of Autobiography of a Liar, choreographer David Gordon brought together the music of Harry Partch and the words of John McPhee from The Control of Nature, read by Norma Fire, in a dance titled "Debris Flow", a "harrowing taped narrative of a family's ordeal in a massive L.A. mudslide..."

== See also ==
- Colluvium
- Illhorn, below which lies Illgraben, a popular debris flow tourist spot
- Rheology
