= The Physics of Blown Sand and Desert Dunes =

Book by Ralph Alger Bagnold

- Title page for The Physics of Blown Sand and Desert Dunes (1941)
- Author: Ralph A. Bagnold
- Language: English
- Subject: Aeolian processes; Geomorphology; Sediment transport
- Publisher: Methuen
- Publication date: 26 June 1941
- Publication place: United Kingdom
- Media type: Print (Hardcover)
- Pages: 265

The Physics of Blown Sand and Desert Dunes is a scientific book written by Ralph A. Bagnold. The book laid the foundations of the scientific investigation of the transport of sand by wind. It also discusses the formation and movement of sand dunes in the Libyan Desert. During his expeditions into the Libyan Desert, Bagnold had been fascinated by the shapes of the sand dunes, and after returning to England he built a wind tunnel and conducted the experiments which are the basis of the book.

Bagnold finished writing the book in 1939, and it was first published on 26 June 1941. A reprinted version, with minor revisions by Bagnold, was published by Chapman and Hall in 1953, and reprinted again in 1971. The book was reissued by Dover Publications in 2005.

The book explores the movement of sand in desert environments, with a particular emphasis on how wind affects the formation and movement of dunes and ripples. Bagnold's interest in this subject was spurred by his extensive desert expeditions, during which he observed various sand storms. One pivotal observation was that the movement of sand, unlike that of dust, predominantly occurs near the ground, within a height of one metre, and was less influenced by large-scale eddy currents in the air.

The book emphasises the feasibility of replicating these natural phenomena under controlled conditions in a laboratory. By using a wind tunnel, Bagnold sought to gain a deeper understanding of the physics governing the interaction between airstreams and sand grains, and vice versa. His aim was to ensure that findings from controlled experiments mirrored real-world conditions, with verifications of these laboratory results conducted through field observations in the Libyan Desert in the late 1930s.

Bagnold delineates his research into two distinct stages. The first, which constitutes the primary focus of the book, investigates the dynamics of sand movement across mostly flat terrains. This includes understanding how sand is lifted, transported, and accumulated on a plane surface. Bagnold's wind tunnel experiments from the mid-1930s form the core of his analysis, though the book also dedicates chapters to the morphology of naturally occurring sand formations.

The second stage, which Bagnold indicates is yet to be fully explored, delves into aeolian transport and the aerodynamics of airstreams as they navigate the curved surfaces of sand accumulations, hinting at the complexities of studying such natural systems. Apart from examining sand and its dynamics in the context of wind, Bagnold also makes comparisons between sand and dry granular snow, noting the parallels in their movement. Differences and similarities between sand movement in air versus water are also highlighted.

Acknowledging the pioneering nature of his work, Bagnold expressed an awareness of the potential limitations and omissions in his study. He also emphasised the balance he attempted to strike between providing a rigorous scientific treatment, incorporating mathematical models and diagrams, while ensuring the content remained accessible to experts across diverse fields, from hydraulic engineering, to geophysics and geomorphology.

The book is still a main reference in the field, and was used by NASA for studying sand dunes and the development of sand-driving mechanisms on Mars.

== See also ==
- Aeolian processes
- Bagnold formula
- Bagnold number
- Barchan
- Bibliography of Aeolian Research
