= Bagnold formula =

Formula relating wind speed and mass transport

The Bagnold formula, named after Ralph Alger Bagnold, relates the amount of sand moved by the wind to wind speed by saltation. It states that the mass transport of sand is proportional to the third power of the friction velocity. Under steady conditions, this implies that mass transport is proportional to the third power of the excess of the wind speed (at any fixed height over the sand surface) over the minimum wind speed that is able to activate and sustain a continuous flow of sand grains.

The formula was derived by Bagnold in 1936 and later published in his book The Physics of Blown Sand and Desert Dunes in 1941. Wind tunnel and field experiments suggest that the formula is basically correct. It has later been modified by several researchers, but is still considered to be the benchmark formula.

In its simplest form, Bagnold's formula may be expressed as:

$$q = C \ \frac{\rho}{g}\ \sqrt{\frac{d}{D}} u_*^3$$

where q represents the mass transport of sand across a lane of unit width; C is a dimensionless constant of order unity that depends on the sand sorting; $\rho$ is the density of air; g is the local gravitational acceleration; d is the reference grain size for the sand; D is the nearly uniform grain size originally used in Bagnold's experiments (250 micrometres); and, finally, $u_*$ is friction velocity proportional to the square root of the shear stress between the wind and the sheet of moving sand.

The formula is valid in dry (desert) conditions. The effects of sand moisture at play in most coastal dunes, therefore, are not included.

== See also ==
- Aeolian landform
- Aeolian process
- Bagnold number
- Barchan
