= Libyan Sands =

1935 travel book

Libyan Sands: Travel in a Dead World
- Author: Ralph A. Bagnold
- Language: English
- Genre: Travel book
- Publication date: 1935

Libyan Sands: Travel in a Dead World (first published 1935; reprinted by Eland in 2010) is a travel book by Ralph A. Bagnold, founder of the British Army's Long Range Desert Group in the Second World War. Sahara expert Eamonn Gearon called it "without question, the classic work of 20th-century Saharan exploration". The book is a first-hand account of Bagnold's pioneering adventures driving Model T Ford automobiles around in the Saharan desert during his time in the British army. The work takes place in the period just prior to World War II. It is still considered a classic work, and in 2010, it was reissued by Eland.

== See also ==
- The Physics of Blown Sand and Desert Dunes
