= Saltation (geology) =

Particle transport by fluids

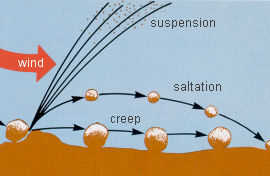
Saltation of sand

In geology, saltation (from Latin saltus 'leap, jump') is a specific type of particle transport by fluids such as wind or water. It occurs when loose materials are removed from a bed and carried by the fluid, before being transported back to the surface. Examples include pebble transport by rivers, sand drift over desert surfaces, soil blowing over fields, and snow drift over smooth surfaces such as those in the Arctic or Canadian Prairies.

== Process ==
At low fluid velocities, loose material rolls downstream, staying in contact with the surface. This is called creep or reptation. Here the forces exerted by the fluid on the particle are only enough to roll the particle around the point of contact with the surface.

Once the wind speed reaches a certain critical value, termed the impact or fluid threshold, the drag and lift forces exerted by the fluid are sufficient to lift some particles from the surface. These particles are accelerated by the fluid, and pulled downward by gravity, causing them to travel in roughly ballistic trajectories. If a particle has obtained sufficient speed from the acceleration by the fluid, it can eject, or splash, other particles in saltation, which propagates the process. Depending on the surface, the particle could also disintegrate on impact, or eject much finer sediment from the surface. In air, this process of saltation bombardment creates most of the dust in dust storms. In rivers, this process repeats continually, gradually eroding away the river bed, but also transporting-in fresh material from upstream.

The speed at which the flow can move particles by saltation is given by the Bagnold formula.

Suspension generally affects small particles ('small' means ~70 micrometres or less for particles in air). For these particles, vertical drag forces due to turbulent fluctuations in the fluid are similar in magnitude to the weight of the particle. These smaller particles are carried by the fluid in suspension, and advected downstream. The smaller the particle, the less important the downward pull of gravity, and the longer the particle is likely to stay in suspension. A fence designed with holes can mitigate saltation by reducing particle speed, and sand accumulates on the leeward side of the fence.

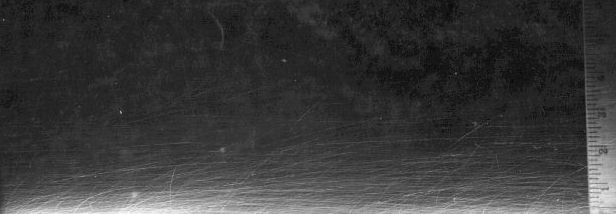
Saltating dune sand in a wind tunnel

Saltating sand particles seem likely to induce a static electric field through the triboelectric effect. Saltating sand acquires a negative charge relative to the ground which in turn loosens more sand particles which then begin saltating. Some work suggests that charging doubles the number of lofted particles predicted by previous theory, but other studies suggest that under certain circumstances charge can inhibit saltation. This is significant in meteorology because it is primarily the saltation of sand particles which dislodges smaller dust particles into the atmosphere. Dust particles and other aerosols such as soot affect the amount of sunlight received by the atmosphere and earth, and are nuclei for condensation of the water vapour.

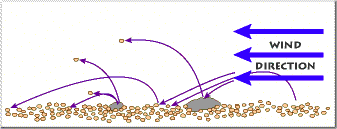
Sand hitting sand is more likely to stick; sand hitting a more coherent surface is more likely to bounce. This feedback loop helps sand accumulate to create dunes.

== Avalanches ==
Saltation layers can also form in avalanches.

== See also ==
- Aeolian landform
- Aeolian processes
- Bagnold formula
- Saltation (biology)
- Saltatory conduction
- The Physics of Blown Sand and Desert Dunes
