= Jabal Arkanu =

Mountain in Libya

Mount Arkanu
- جبل أركنو; Jabal Arkanu
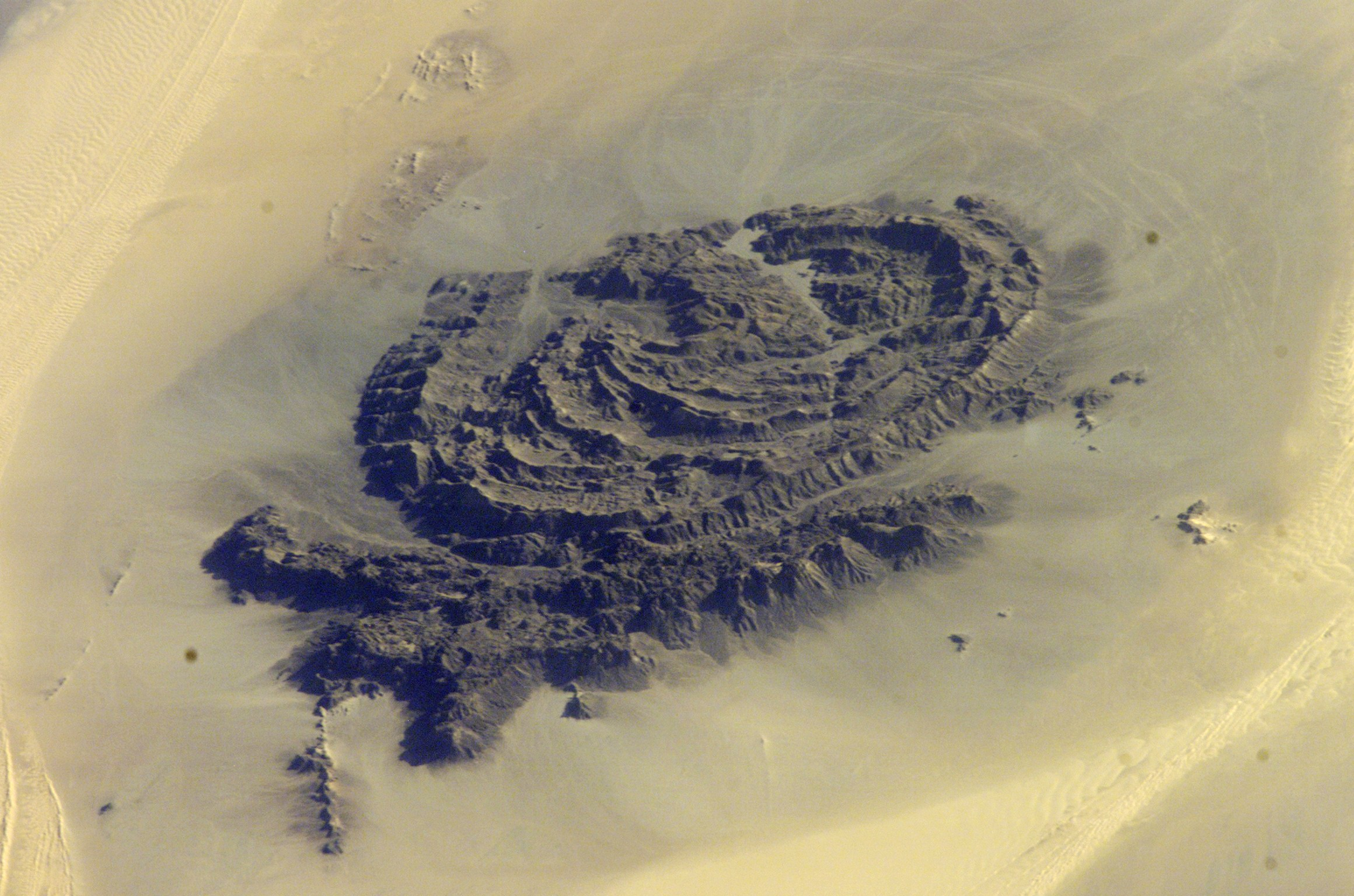
- Mount Arkanu seen from space

Highest point
- Elevation: 1,435 m (4,708 ft)
- Coordinates: 22°12′30″N 24°44′15″E

Dimensions
- Length: 28 km (17 mi) ENE/WSW
- Width: 18 km (11 mi) NNW/SSE

Geography
- Location within Libya
- Country: Libya

Mount Arkanu or Jabal Arkanu (also Jebel Arkenu or Gebel Árchenu) is a mountain in Libya.

== Geography ==
The mountain is located in the Libyan Desert in the Kufra District of Libya, about 300 km southeast of El Tag and about 70 km west of Arkanu and the two Arkenu structures. Its height is 1,435 metres (4,708 ft), rising about 500 m above the surrounding Gilf Kebir plateau and a valley-oasis. Mount Arkanu is 28 kilometres (17 mi) long and 18 kilometres (11 mi) wide.

Arkanu's existence has been known since 1892 through Arab sources. Arkanu was first discovered in 1923 by Ahmed Hassanein. The mountain consists of intrusive granite. The valley is 15 km long and oriented east–west. The valley has a green environment consisting of bushes, grass and some trees.

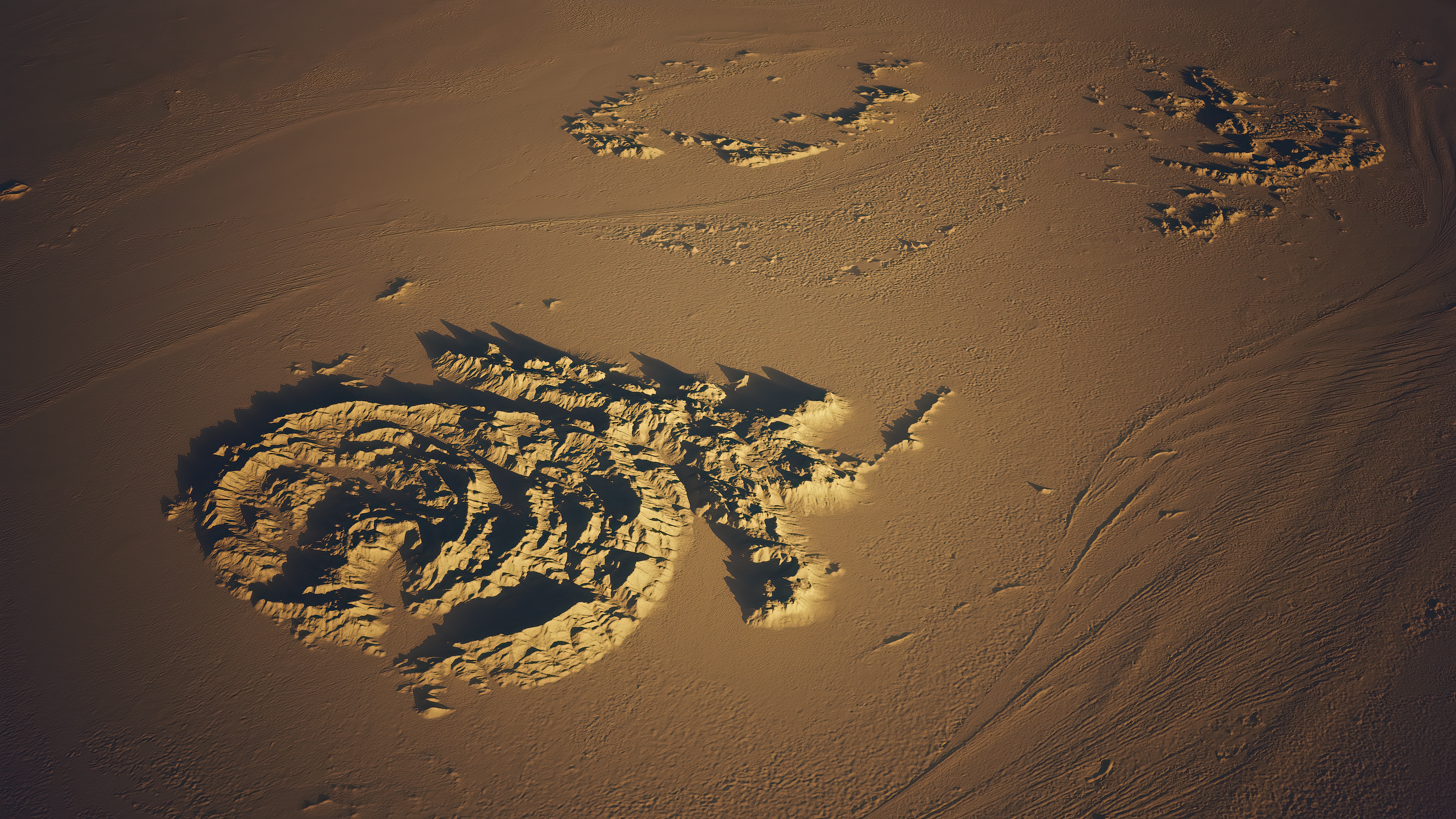
3D rendering of Jebel Arkenu using DEM-data (image points roughly to the north)

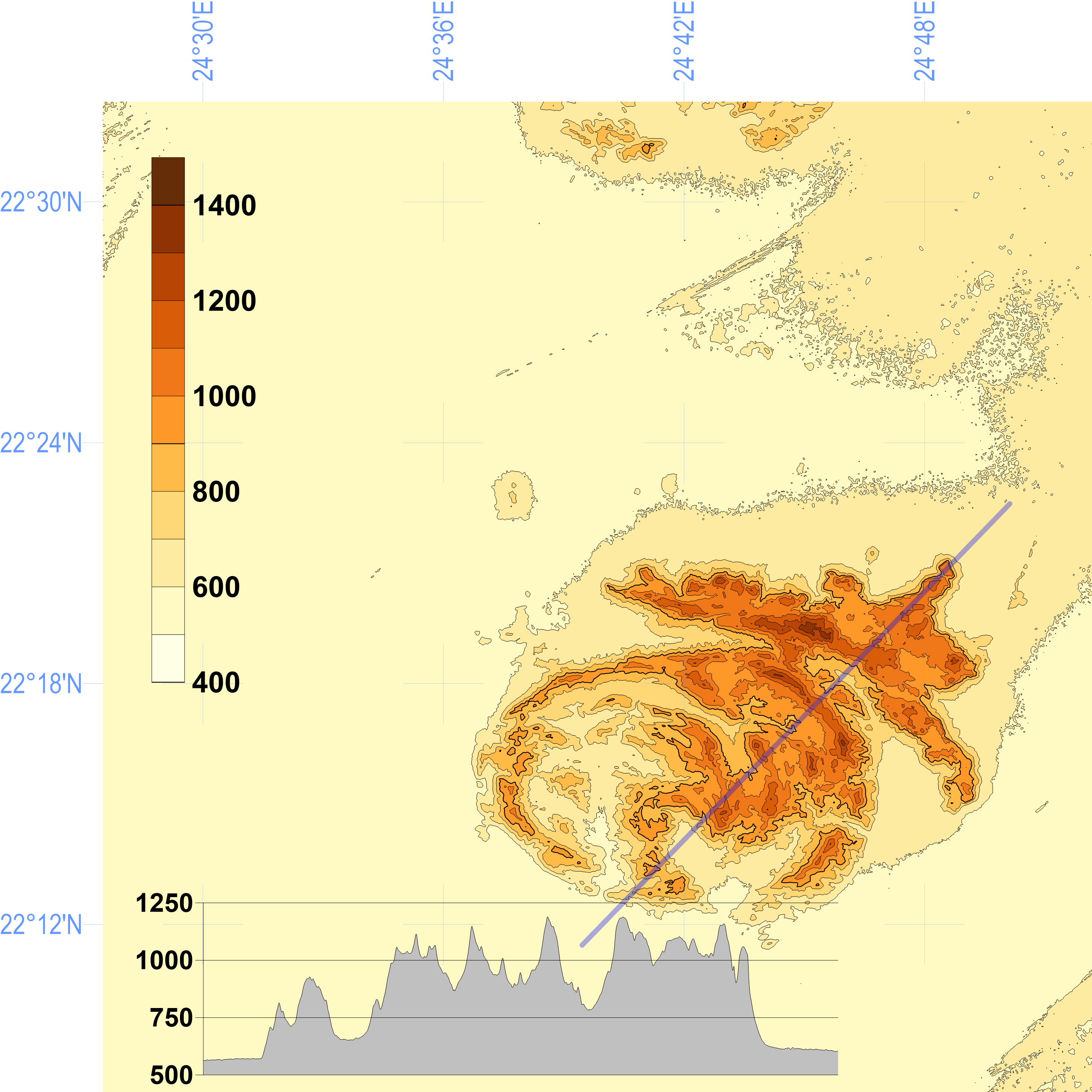
Topographic map and elevation profile (bottom left) of Jebel Arkenu

Arkanu is used as a pasture. Each year the Bedouins bring their herds to the valley, leave them there and block the entrance (located at a height of 598 metres (1,962 ft)) with rocks. They return three months later to retrieve their cattle.

== Archeology ==
A 2003 field trip to the Djebel Arkenu and Djebel Uweinat regions uncovered several new rock art sites that had not been previously reported in the literature. The researchers paid particular attention to the Djebel Arkenu, a smaller mountain neighboring the more well-known Djebel Uweinat.

In the Djebel Arkenu, two petroglyph sites were discovered deep within the main wadi. The first Arkenu site (Arkenu I) was a boulder with a flat, sloping top that bore a variety of petroglyphs, primarily depicting bovids such as oryx and cattle, as well as a few canids and other indistinct animals. A single bovid petroglyph was found on an isolated rock about 40 meters upstream, acting as an intermediary signpost to the next site.

The second Arkenu site (Arkenu II) was located about 20 meters above the wadi floor on a perpendicular rock face with flanking wings, as well as a large sloping slab at the base. The motifs at this site were quite different, featuring a predominance of giraffes and a few indistinct bovid remains.

These newly discovered Arkenu rock art sites provide additional insights into the rich cultural heritage and symbolic significance of this remote desert region. The researchers note that previous expeditions to the Djebel Uweinat had largely focused on Djebel Uweinat, often neglecting the neighboring Djebel Arkenu area.

== Sources ==
- Bertarelli, L.V. (1929). Guida d'Italia, Vol. XVII (in Italian). Milano: Consociazione Turistica Italiana.
