= Libyan Desert =

North-eastern part of the Sahara Desert

Coordinates: 24°N 25°E

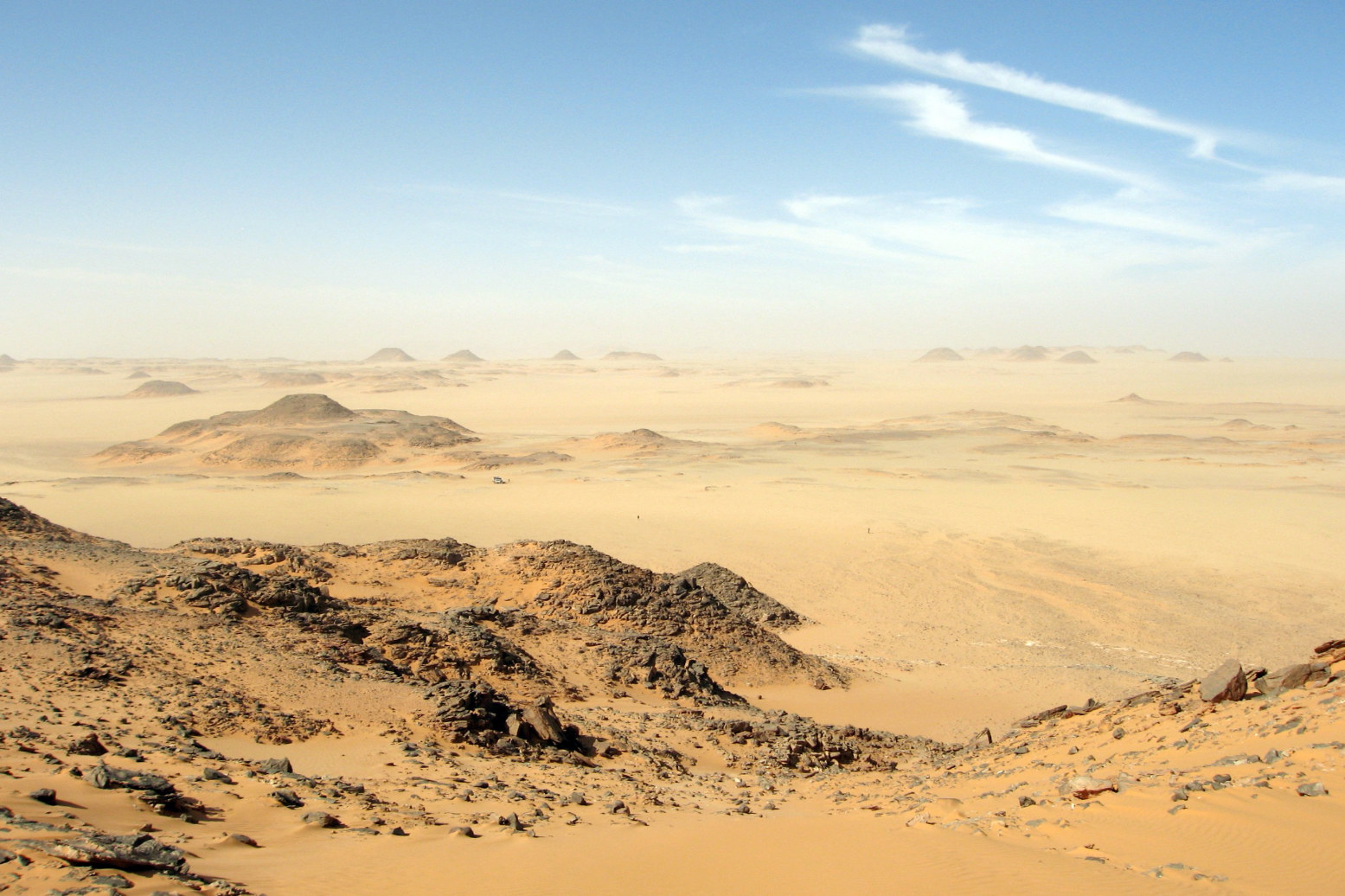
The Libyan Desert landscape east of the Gilf Kebir.

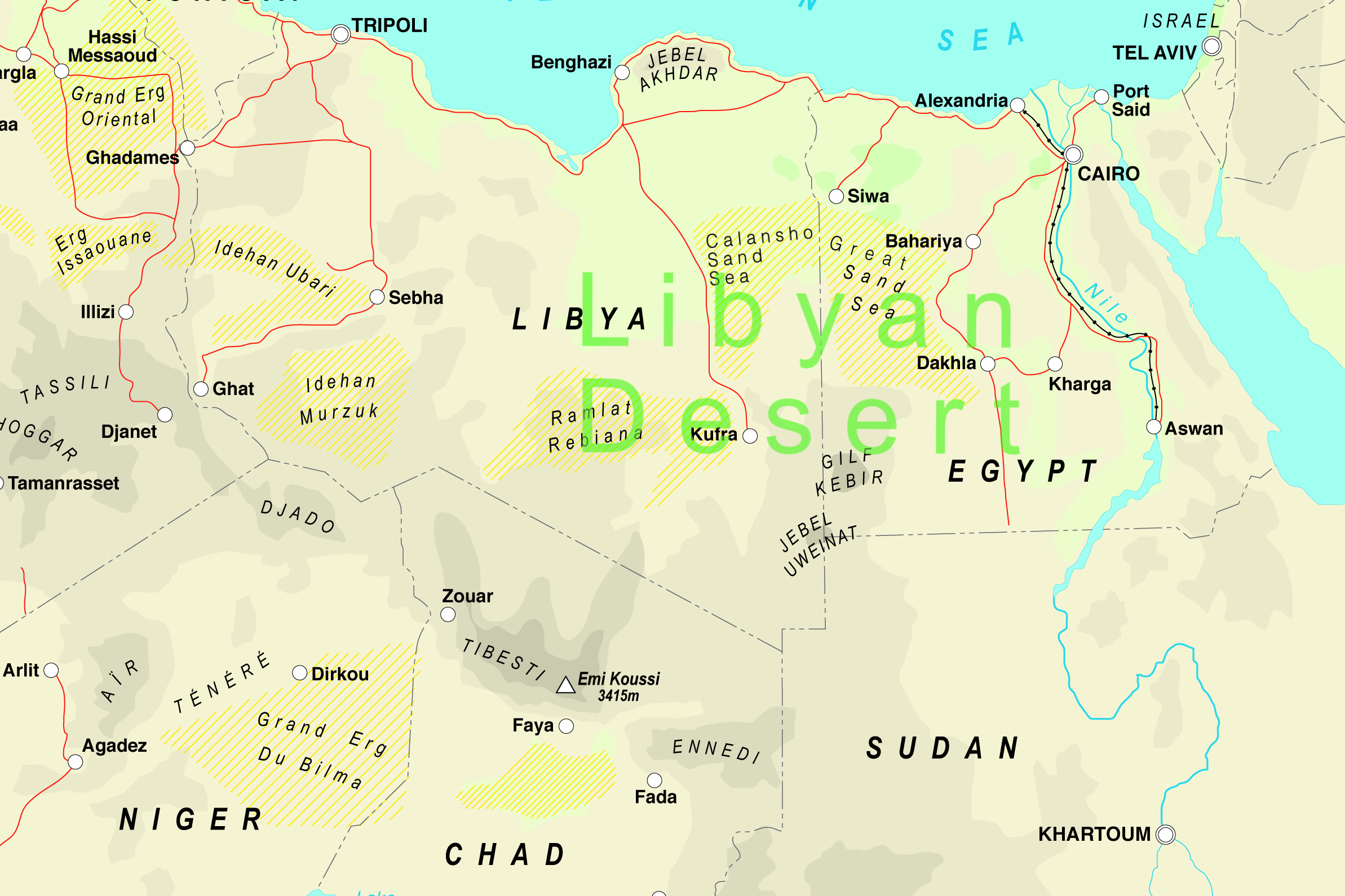
Map of the Libya Desert

The Libyan Desert is a geographical region filling the northeastern Sahara Desert, from eastern Libya to the Western Desert of Egypt and far northwestern Sudan approximately 1,300,000 km². On medieval maps, its use predates today's Sahara, and parts of the Libyan Desert include the Sahara's most arid and least populated regions; this is chiefly what sets the Libyan Desert apart from the greater Sahara. The consequent absence of grazing, and near absence of waterholes or wells needed to sustain camel caravans, prevented Trans-Saharan trade between Kharga (the Darb al Arbein) close to the Nile, and Murzuk in the Libyan Fezzan. This obscurity saw the region overlooked by early European explorers, and it was not until the early 20th century and the advent of the motor car before the Libyan Desert started to be fully explored.

== Nomenclature ==
The term Libyan Desert began to appear widely on European maps in the last decades of the 19th century, typically identified as straddling the borders of present-day Egypt and Libya. This name derived from a territory known as Ancient Libya. (It was not until 1934 that former Ottoman Tripolitania became known as Libya.) In his book Libyan Sands, Ralph Bagnold went as far as to suggest that the Libyan Desert was a separate geographical entity from the Sahara, cut off by the mountains and plateaus of the Ennedi and Tibesti in northern Chad, and the Akakus and Tassili n'Ajjer along the Algerian border in the west. Since that time the meaning has come to revert to the definition given above.

== Geography ==
The Libyan Desert covers an area of approximately 1,300,000 km^{2} (500,000 square miles), and extends approximately 1,100 km (680 miles) from east to west, and 1,000 km from north to south, in about the shape of a rectangle slanting to the south-east. Like most of the Sahara, this desert is primarily sand and hamada or stony plain.

Sand plains, dunes, ridges, and some depressions (basins) typify the endorheic region, with no rivers draining into or out of the desert. The Gilf Kebir plateau reaches an altitude of just over 1,000 m (3,300 feet), and along with the nearby massif of Jebel Uweinat is an exception to the uninterrupted territory of basement rocks covered by layers of horizontally bedded sediments, forming a massive sand plain, low plateaus, and dunes.

The desert features a striking diversity of landscapes including mountains, oases, and sand seas.

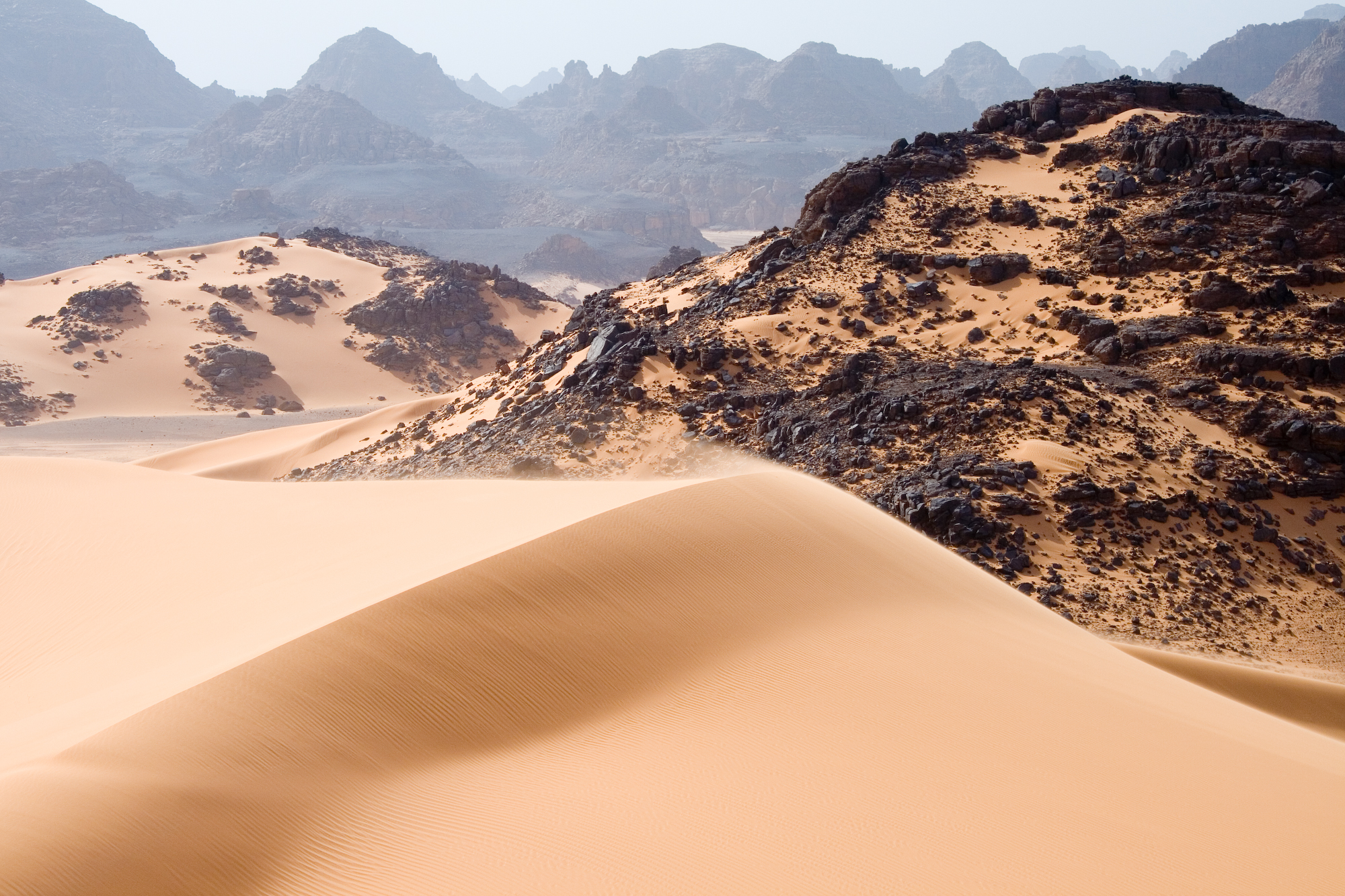
Acacus landscape

To the south lie the main mountain ranges, from the Jebel Uweinat (1,980 m or 6,500 feet), on the Libya-Egypt-Sudan border, the Tibesti to the south, on the border with Chad, and the Acacus to the southwest. The main oases are Jaghbub and Jalo in the east, in Cyrenaica, Kufra in the southeast, and Murzuk in the south, in Fezzan. The sand seas lie in a ring around the border of Libya. To the east lies the Calanshio Sand Sea, the western lobe of the Great Sand Sea straddling the Libya-Egypt border, which stretches 800 km (500 miles) from Jaghbub and Jalo in the north to Kufra in the south. To the southeast lies the Rebiana Sand Sea, near the border with Sudan. To the southwest is the Idehan Murzuq, bordering Chad, and to west lies the Idehan Ubari, bordering Algeria. The sand seas contain dunes up to 512 m (1,680 feet) in height, and cover approximately one quarter of the total desert region.

Other features are the Aswad al Haruj (the "Black Desert"), a large circular region of black volcanic shield in the centre of the country, and the Hamada al Hamra (the "Red Desert") a rocky plateau to the west, on the Tunisian border, coloured by iron oxide deposits. To the southeast, between Kufra and the Libya-Egypt-Sudan border, lies the Jebel Arkenu, with the associated Arkenu structures, thought to be caused by meteorite strikes. North of the Gilf Kebir plateau, among the shallow peripheral dunes of the southern Great Sand Sea, is a field of Libyan desert glass. This is thought to be associated with a meteorite impact, marked by the Kebira crater, on the Libya-Egypt border. A specimen of the desert glass was used in a piece of Tutankhamun's ancient jewellery.

The Libyan Desert is barely populated apart from the modern settlements at oases of the lower Cyrenaica region in southeastern Libya. The indigenous population are Bisharin tribe, Mahas, and Berber. Where the desert extends into Egypt and no longer in Libya, it is generally known as the "Western Desert". The term "Western Desert" contrasts with the Eastern Desert to the east of the Nile River, which lies between the Nile and the Red Sea.

== Climate ==
The Libyan Desert is said to be one of the least hospitable regions on Earth. Its climate is surprisingly variable, being hot in summer, with average daytime temperatures of 50 °C (122 °F) and above, though this drops rapidly at night. In winter, days are cool, with temperatures averaging 27 °C (81 °F), but at night this can drop below freezing, with temperatures of −9 °C (16 °F) recorded. At these times the formation of hoar frost is not uncommon, and they are known as "White Nights".

In the north, along the Mediterranean shore, cool onshore winds blow inland, while further south, hot, dry winds, known as Ghibli, blow from the interior, creating blinding sand-storms. Periodic droughts are common in the desert, often lasting several years.

== Fauna ==
Despite it being one of the least hospitable regions on Earth, the Libyan desert has a range of animals that have adapted to the harsh conditions. Most of the fauna are located around oases, rocky terrains and areas that do receive occasional rain. Most of the animal have adapted physiological and behavioral features such as: nocturnal activity, burrowing, water conservation and tolerance to heat.

Among the mammals found in the rocky areas of Libyan desert are the Fennec fox, Rüppell's fox, Sand cat, Dorcas gazelle, and Barbary sheep. Historically, Larger Saharan animal like the Addax and Scimitar-horned oryx were common in the region, but their populations have declined because of illegal hunting.

Reptiles are the most noticeable animals in the desert. Among them are the Horned viper, Egyptian cobra, Desert monitor, and types of Geckos, skinks, and agamid lizards. these reptiles can survive in very hot conditions while hiding beneath rocks and sands during the hot hours of the day.

Though birds are not common in the desert, several types can be found around oases and wetlands in certain seasons. These birds include the Desert sparrow, Lanner falcon and Egyptian vulture. Invertebrates are a major part of the Libyan desert ecosystem. they include scorpions, beetles, ants, spiders and other small animals without backbones. Many of them are active at night time to avoid the extreme heat.

== History ==
=== Historical desert ===
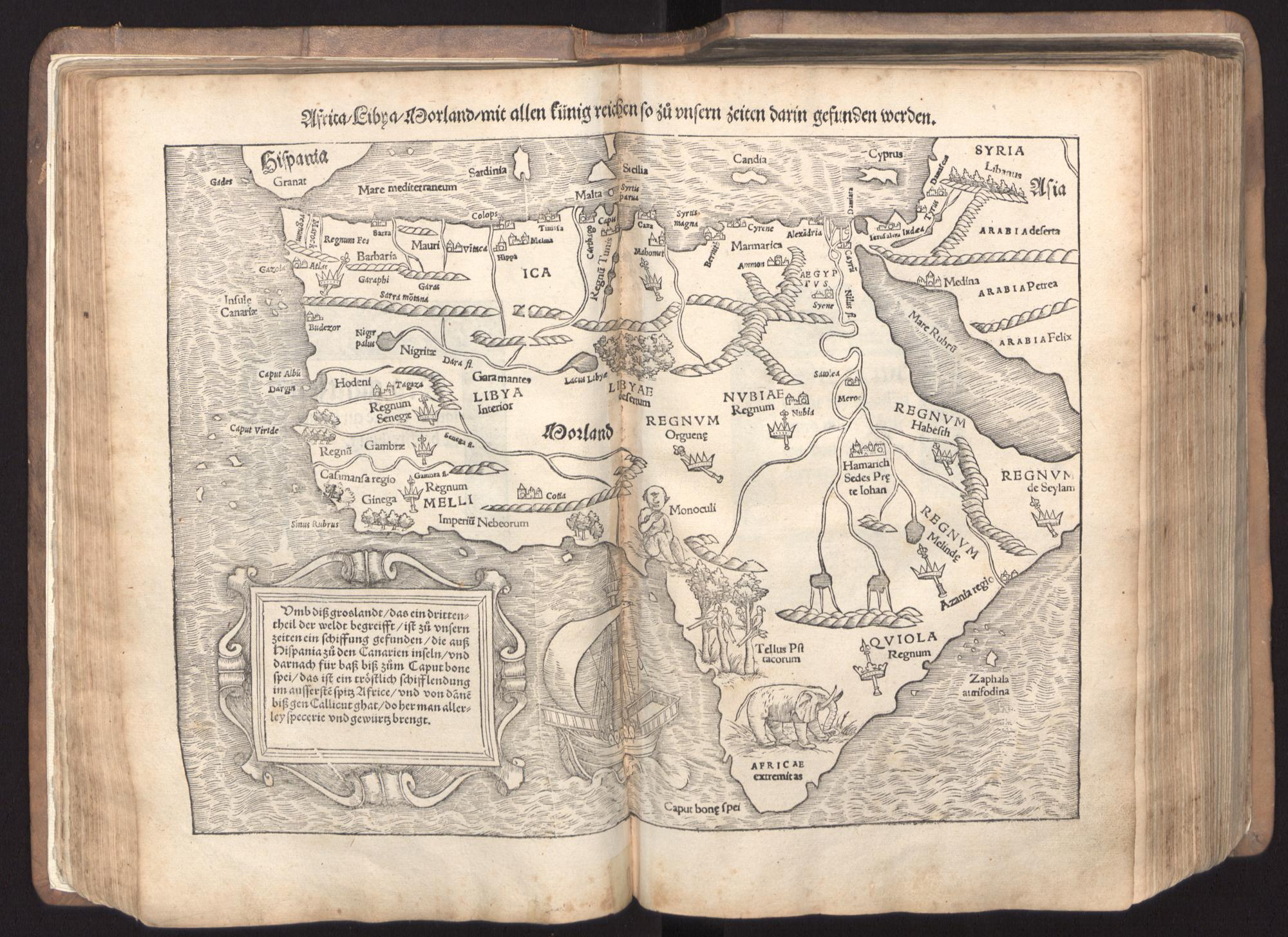
In this map of Africa from Sebastian Münster's Cosmographia (1545), the Libyan Desert (marked Libyae desertum and Libya Interior) is shown in the center of the continent, west of Nubiae regnum, south of Regnum Tunis and east of Regnum Senegae.

Historically, "Libya" referred to an ill-defined area to the west of Ancient Egypt, whose boundary traditionally was the lake of Mareotis, outside Alexandria. The ancient Greeks, such as Herodotus, regarded the whole of the North African littoral, to Cape Spartel in Morocco, as "Libya". Later, the Romans organized the region the provinces of Libya Inferior and Libya Superior, which covered western Egypt and Cyrenaica. Thus the "Libyan Desert" was the desert to the south of Ancient Libya. With the organization of the Italian colony of Libya in the 20th century the term "Libyan Desert" for this region became a misnomer, and the area of desert within Egypt became known as the "Western Desert" (i.e. west of the Nile, in contradistinction to the Eastern Desert, east of the Nile).

=== World War I ===
Following the conquest of the territory by Italy during the Italo-Turkish War of 1911–12, the desert became the scene of a two-decade struggle between the Italians and the Senussi starting from 1915, who were centred on the Jebel Akhdar in Cyrenaica and on the Kufra oasis. It ended in 1931 with the conquest of Kufra by the Italians.

=== Modern exploration ===
During the 1930s the Libyan Desert was the scene of exploration and mapping by the Italian Army and Air Force. Others, such as Ralph Bagnold and László Almásy also travelled in south-eastern Libya and southern Egypt, searching for the lost oasis of Zerzura. Bagnold also travelled into northern Chad, to the Mourdi Depression, recording his findings in his book Libyan Sands: Travel in a Dead World, which was published in 1935.

=== World War II ===
During the Second World War the north-eastern desert between El Agheila and the Egyptian border was the scene of heavy fighting between the Axis powers and the Western Allies, a period known as the Western Desert Campaign. The deep desert saw operations by the Italian Auto-Saharan Companies, in combat with the Allied Long Range Desert Group (LRDG) and the Free French Régiment de Tirailleurs Sénégalais du Tchad (RTST). Other actions included the Siege of Giarabub (now Jaghbub), the battle of Kufra and the raid on Murzuk, all in 1941.

The Calanshio Sand Sea is the site of the missing World War II aircraft Lady Be Good. The wreck was discovered 200 km (120 mi) north of Kufra 15 years after it was reported missing in 1943.

== See also ==
- Algerian Desert
- Nubian Desert
- Libyan Sea
