= Bagnold Dunes =

Sand dunes in Gale Crater, Mars

The Bagnold Dunes is a 35-kilometre-long (22 mi) group of dark grey dunes in the Gale Crater on Mars. They are named after Ralph Alger Bagnold, who crossed the Libyan Desert and was one of the first explorers to acquire a deep understanding of the physics behind sand dunes. The dunes migrate around 0.4 metres (1.3 ft) every Earth year.

== Research ==
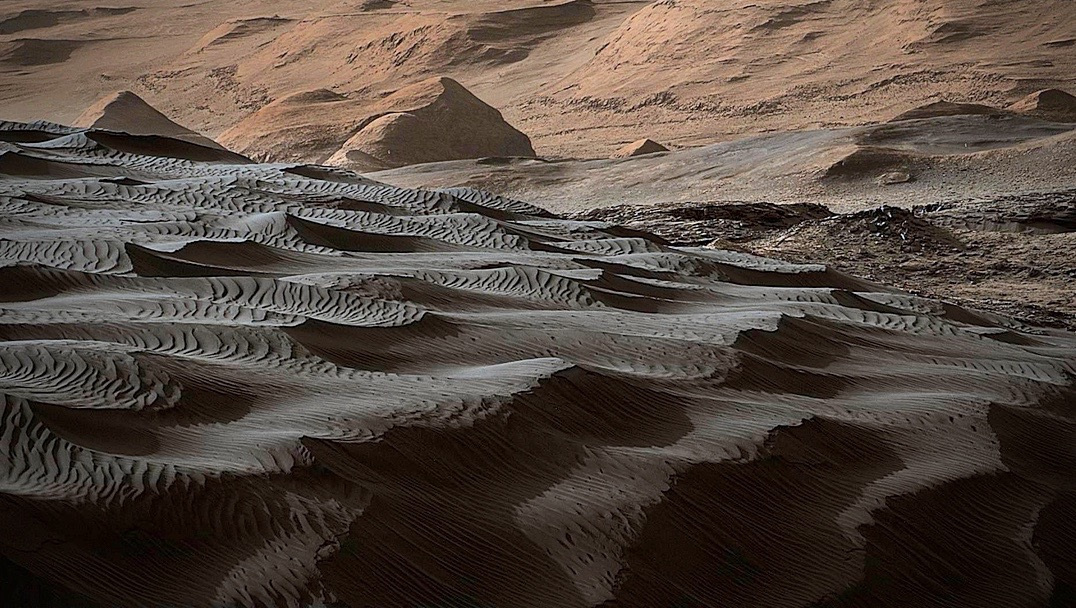
Namib dune, on the northwestern flank of Mount Sharp

In November 2015, NASA's rover Curiosity began exploring the dunes, finishing the exploration in April 2017. Phase 1 investigated Namib and High Dunes on the edge of the dune field during the late autumn and winter, while Phase 2 was conducted in the southern summer at the linear Nathan Bridges Dune and Mount Desert Island, a ripple field on the southern side of the dunes.

In a research paper published on November 1, 2021, the samples taken and examined by the rover in a wet-chemistry derivatization experiment were analyzed, and according to the research, the samples taken in the dunes contained organic compounds. Specifically, it found in the sand samples chemically derivatized ammonia and benzoic acid, as well as phosphoric acid, phenol, several nitrogen-bearing molecules, and as-yet unidentified high-molecular-weight compounds.
