= Gabal El Uweinat =

Mountain range in Egypt, Libya and Sudan

Mount Uwaynat
- جبل العوينات; Jabal al-ʿUwaināt or Gabal El ʿUwaināt
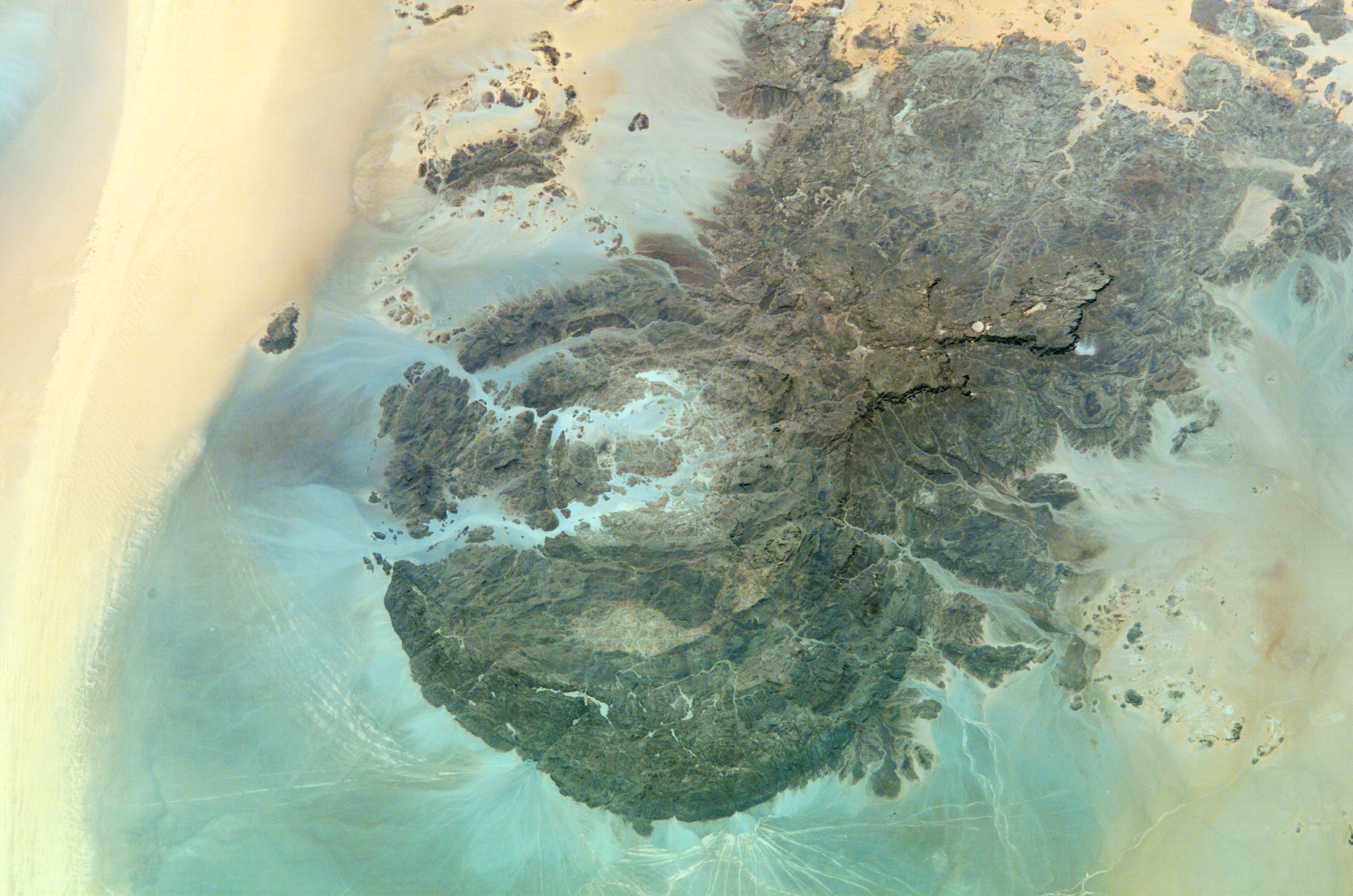
- Mount Uwaynat on the border of Egypt, Libya and Sudan

Highest point
- Elevation: 1,895 m (6,217 ft)
- Prominence: 1,266 m (4,154 ft)
- Listing: Ribu
- Coordinates: 21°55′N 25°01′E

Dimensions
- Length: 30 km (19 mi)
- Width: 25 km (16 mi)

Geography
- Location within Egypt Location within Libya Location within Sudan Location within Africa
- Countries: Egypt, Libya, Sudan

Mount Uwaynat or Gabal El Uweinat (Arabic: جبل العوينات Gabal El ʿUwaināt or Jabal al-ʿUwaināt, Arabic for 'Mountain of the springs') is a mountain range in the area of the Egyptian-Libyan-Sudanese tripoint. Because of thousands of prehistoric rock art sites, it is considered an important witness to the development of early pastoralism in the Sahara.

== Cultural significance ==
The area is notable for its prehistoric rock carvings, first reported by the Egyptian explorer Ahmed Pasha Hassanein—the discoverer of Uweinat, who in 1923 traversed the first 40 km of the eastern side of the mountain, without reaching the end. Engraved in sandstone, thousands of petroglyphs are visible, representing lions, giraffes, ostriches, gazelles, cows and small human figures. According to a technical report of UNESCO, "Thousands of rock art sites of different styles and themes are distributed all over the area, [attesting] to the development of early pastoralism in Africa and exchanges among different ethnic groups across the Sahara."

== Geography ==
Mount Uwaynat lies about 40 km S-SE of Jabal Arkanu. The main spring called Ain Dua lies at the foot of the mountain, on the Libyan side. The western foot (located at 21°52′29″N 24°54′16″E according to Hassanein) is 618 m high, and overcast with giant boulders fallen because of erosion. In general, the western slope constitutes an oasis, with wells, bushes and grass.

The western part of the massif consists of intrusive granite, arranged in a ring shape of some 25 km diameter, ending in three valleys (wadis) towards the West, named Karkur Hamid, Karkur Idriss and Karkur Ibrahim. Its eastern part consists of sandstone, ending in Karkur Talh. In Karkur Murr, there is a permanent oasis (Guelta), called Ain El Brins (Bir Murr).

In the sandstone part, four plateaus emerge from the level of the surrounding desert: the Hassanein plateau, connected to an unnamed plateau through a narrow neck, the Italia plateau and another unnamed plateau. The highest point of Uweinat is on top of the Italia plateau. There are two cairns on the top; the first was erected by R.A. Bagnold and the second by Captain Marchesi, both in the 1930s.

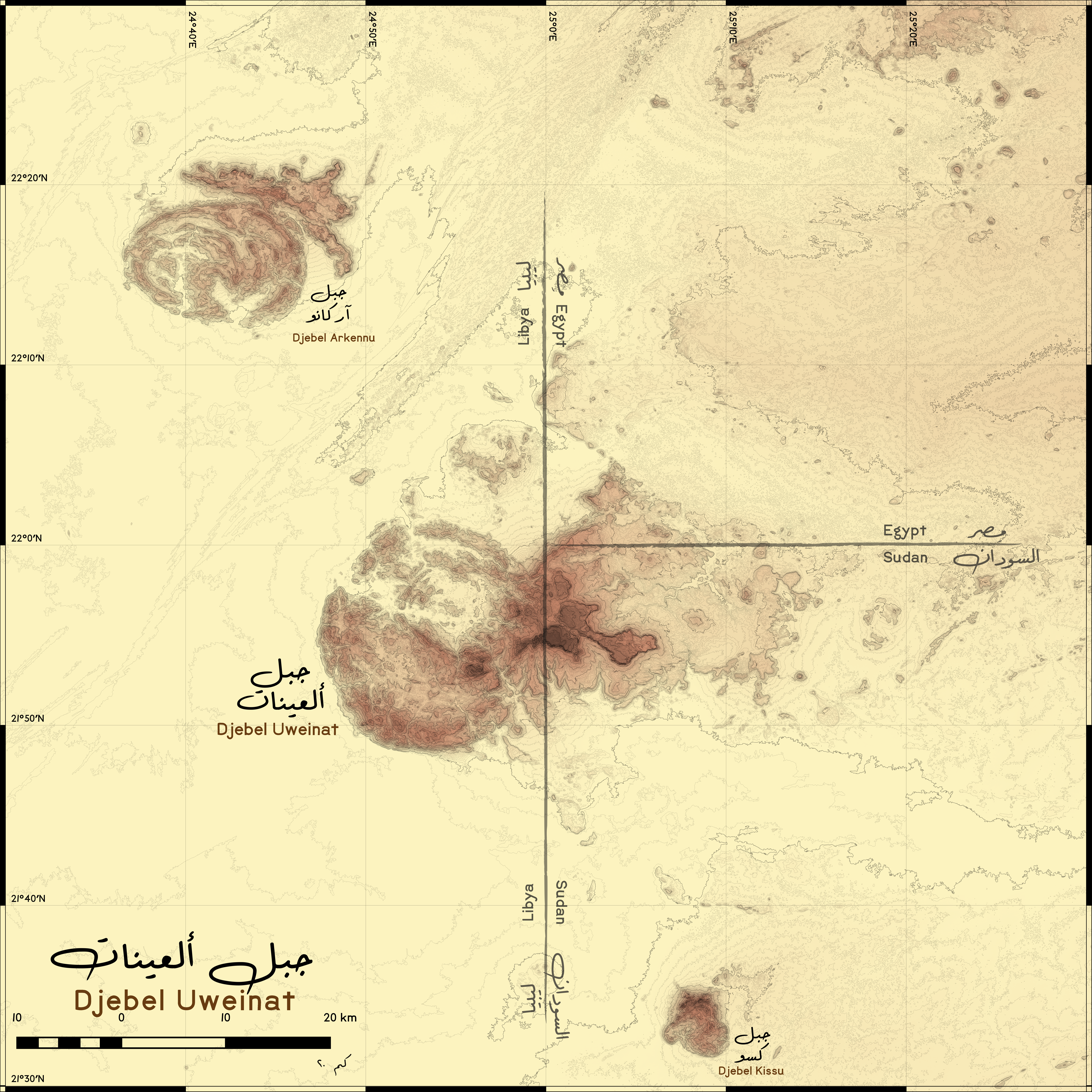
Topographic map of Djebel Uweinat

== Exploration ==
- Ahmed Pasha Hassanein—The discoverer who first published its existence on his 1923 map.
- Prince Kamal al-Dine Hussein (son of Hussein Kamel, Sultan of Egypt)
- Ralph Alger Bagnold—Founder of the Long Range Desert Group (LRDG) and desert explorer
- Pat Clayton—LRDG and Egyptian Government Survey
- László Almásy—Hungarian desert researcher
- Hubert W. G. J. Penderel
- Leo Frobenius
- Hans Rhotert
- Prinz Ferdinand von Lichtenstein
- Mahmoud Marai (who co-discovered the Yam Inscriptions near the southern end of the mountain in 2007)

== Sources ==
- Bertarelli, L.V. (1929). Guida d'Italia, Vol. XVII (in Italian). Milano: Consociazione Turistica Italiana.
