= Bagnold's fluid =

Bagnold's fluid refers to a suspension of neutrally buoyant particles in a Newtonian fluid such as water or air. The term is named after Ralph Alger Bagnold, who placed such a suspension in an annular coaxial cylindrical rheometer in order to investigate the effects of grain interaction in the suspension.

== Constitutive relations ==
By experiments described in his 1954 paper, Bagnold showed that when a shear flow is applied to the suspension, then the shear and normal stresses in the suspension may vary linearly or quadratically with the shear rate, depending on the strength of viscous effects compared to the particles' inertia.

If the shear and normal stresses in the mixture (suspension: mixture of solid and fluid) vary quadratically with the shear rate, the flow is said to satisfy Bagnold's grain-inertia flow. If this relation is linear, then the motion is said to satisfy Bagnold's macro-viscous flow.

These relationships, particularly the quadratic relationship, are referred to as the Bagnold rheology. Although Bagnold used wax spheres suspended in a glycerin-water-alcohol mixture, many subsequent shear-cell experiments for both wet and dry mixtures, as well as computer simulations, have confirmed these relations. Bagnold's rheology can be used to describe debris and granular flows down inclined slopes.

=== Explanation ===
For low shear rates, dilute suspensions or suspensions involving small particles, the viscosity of the fluid is a much stronger effect than the inertia of the particles. The particles do not interact strongly with each other. By considering the forces on a particle in a fluid in the Stokes regime, it can be shown that the presence of the particle simply increases the 'effective viscosity' of the fluid.

At high shear rates, the inertia of the particles is the dominant effect, and the suspension's behaviour is governed by collisions between particles. In his 1954 paper, Bagnold justified the quadratic relationship by collisional arguments. He considered an idealised situation in which layers of particles are regular, and slide and collide regularly with each other. Then the impulse of each collision between particles is proportional to the shear rate, and so is the number of collisions per unit time; and hence the total impulse on a particle per unit time is proportional to the square of the shear rate.

== Sedimentation ==
If the particles in the suspension are not neutrally buoyant, then the additional effect of settling also takes place. Pudasaini (2011) used the above constitutive relations to establish a scaling law for the sedimentation time. It is found analytically that the macro-viscous fluid settles much faster than the grain-inertia fluid, as manifested by dispersive pressure.

Given the same time, the macroviscous fluid is settled 6/5 unit length compared to the unit length settlement of the grain-inertia fluid as measured from the nose-tip of the flowfront that has already settled to the back side of the debris. Therefore, the macroviscous fluid settles (completely stops to flow) 20% faster than the grain-inertia fluid. Due to the dispersive pressure in grain-inertia fluid, the settlement process is delayed by 20% for the grain-inertia fluid than for the macroviscous fluid. This is meaningful because particles are more agitated due to higher dispersive pressure in grain-inertia fluids than in macroviscous fluids. Once the material comes close to rest, these dispersive forces (induced by the quadratic shear rate), are still active for grain-inertia fluid but macroviscous fluid settles relatively faster because it is less dispersive. This provides a tool to approximate and estimate the final settlement time (the time at which the entire fluid body is at rest). These are mechanically important relationships concerning the settlement time and the settlement lengths between the grain-inertia and the macroviscous fluids.
