= Ralph Bagnold =

British Army officer (1896–1990)

Ralph Alger Bagnold FRS, OBE, KL
- Born: 3 April 1896; Plymouth, Devon, England
- Died: 28 May 1990 (aged 94)
- Known for: Desert exploration, aeolian research, founding the Long Range Desert Group, Bagnold number
- Spouse: Dorothy Alice Bagnold
- Military career
- Branch: British Army
- Service years: 1915–1935, 1939–1944
- Rank: Brigadier
- Service number: 10231
- Units: Royal Engineers; Royal Corps of Signals
- Commands: Long Range Desert Group
- Conflicts: First World War; Second World War

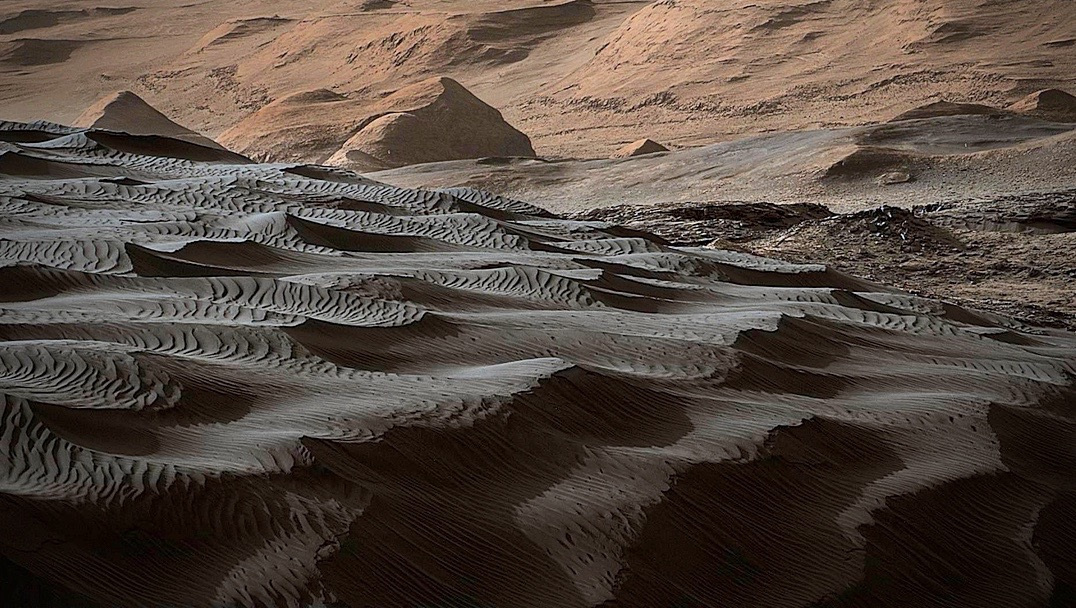
Part of the Bagnold Dune Field in Gale Crater on Mars, named to honour Brigadier Bagnold.

Brigadier Ralph Alger Bagnold, OBE, FRS, (3 April 1896 – 28 May 1990) was an English 20th-century desert explorer, geologist, and soldier.

Bagnold served in the First World War as an engineer in the British Army.

In 1932, he staged the first recorded East-to-West crossing of the Libyan Desert. His work in the field of Aeolian processes was the basis for the book The Physics of Blown Sand and Desert Dunes, establishing the discipline of aeolian geomorphology, combining field work observations, experiments and physical equations. His work has been used by United States' space agency NASA in its study of the terrain of the planet Mars, the Bagnold Dunes on Mars' surface were named after him by the organisation.

He returned to the forces in the Second World War, in which he founded the behind-the-lines reconnaissance, espionage, and raiding unit, the Long Range Desert Group, serving as its first commanding officer in the North Africa campaign.

== Early life ==
Bagnold was born in Devonport, England. His father, Colonel Arthur Henry Bagnold (1854–1943) (Royal Engineers), participated in the rescue expedition of 1884–85 to rescue General Gordon in Khartoum, Sudan. His sister was the novelist and playwright Enid Bagnold, who wrote the 1935 novel National Velvet.

After Malvern College, he attended the Royal Military Academy, Woolwich. In 1915, Ralph Bagnold followed in his father's footsteps and was commissioned into the Royal Engineers, after having graduated from the Royal Military Academy, Woolwich. He spent three years in the trenches in France, being mentioned in despatches in 1917 and receiving the Belgian Order of Leopold in 1919.

After the war Bagnold studied engineering at Gonville and Caius College, Cambridge, obtaining an MA before returning to active duty with the British Army in 1920 with the Royal Corps of Signals. He served in Cairo and the North West Frontier, India, where he was again mentioned in dispatches. In both of these locations, he spent much of his leave exploring the local deserts. After having read Ahmed Hassanein's "Lost Oasis" he spent one such expedition in 1929 using a Ford Model A automobile and two Ford lorries exploring the vast swathe of desert from Cairo to Ain Dalla which was an area reputed to contain the mythical city of Zerzura. After a brief period of half-pay, he left the Army in 1935, but rejoined upon the outbreak of the Second World War.

== Desert exploration ==
Bagnold and his travelling companions were early pioneers in the use of motor vehicles to explore the desert. In 1932 Bagnold explored the Mourdi Depression, in present-day Chad, and found implements dated to the Palaeolithic period in the valley. Bagnold wrote of his travels in the book Libyan Sands: Travel in a Dead World (first published 1935; reprinted by Eland in 2010). He is credited with developing a sun compass, which is not affected by magnetic iron ore deposits or by metal vehicles as a magnetic compass might be. During the 1930s his group also began the practice of reducing tyre pressure when driving over loose sand.

In addition Bagnold is credited with devising a method of driving over the large sand dunes found in the "sand seas" of the Libyan Desert. He wrote, "I increased speed. ... A huge glaring wall of yellow shot up high into the sky. The lorry tipped violently backwards—and we rose as in a lift, smoothly without vibration. We floated up on a yellow cloud. All the accustomed car movements had ceased; only the speedometer told us we were still moving fast. It was incredible ..." However, noted Fitzroy Maclean, "too much dash had its penalties. Many of the dunes fell away sharply at the far side and if you arrived at the top at full speed, you were likely to plunge headlong over the precipice. ... and end up with your truck upside down on top of you."

A recently discovered silent film documents Bagnold's explorations and is available via the British Film Institute.

== Second World War ==
Bagnold wrote, "Never in our peacetime travels had we imagined that war could ever reach the enormous empty solitudes of the inner desert, walled off by sheer distance, lack of water, and impassable seas of sand dunes. Little did we dream that any of the special equipment and techniques we had evolved for very long-distance travel, and for navigation, would ever be put to serious use."

On 10 June 1940 Italy declared war on the United Kingdom in alliance with Germany while Bagnold was in Cairo due to an accident involving a troopship collision that he was on interrupting his journey elsewhere. Upon hearing the news and realizing that North Africa was about to become a theatre of war, he requested an interview with General Archibald Wavell, Commander-in-Chief Middle East. Having secured it, Bagnold suggested that Wavell use his knowledge of the terrain in North Africa to establish a mobile scouting force for desert operations against the Italian Armed Forces in Libya, which Wavell was charged with defeating in the field. During the conversation Wavell asked Bagnold what he would do if he found that the Italians were not doing anything beyond the Libyan coast in the desert interior. Bagnold replied that the new unit that he had in mind might be able to commit "acts of piracy on the high desert". Wavell granted Bagnold authority to form a unit along these lines, with it being constituted in July 1940 with the name Long Range Desert Group (L.R.D.G.). After assembling its first formation, Bagnold was the L.R.D.G.'s commanding officer until August 1941, when he handed over command to Guy Prendergast on being promoted to the post of Inspector of Desert Troops.

In October 1941 he was promoted to the post of Deputy Signal Officer-in-Chief Middle East, with the temporary rank of Brigadier and worked on camouflage and deception operations. He left after six months in March 1942, visiting Gaza, Brummana and Jerusalem (October 1942), Sudan and Eritrea (December 1942) and Turkey (May 1943 and August 1943) before returning to England in March 1944.

On 7 June 1944 Bagnold retired from the British Army with the end of military operations in North Africa after the Axis powers' defeat in that theatre. and returned to his scientific interests, being elected to a Fellowship of the Royal Society in the same year.

== Later work ==
After the war Bagnold continued to work in the field of the geological science, and he published academic papers into his nineties. He made significant contributions to the understanding of desert terrain such as sand dunes, ripples and sheets. He developed the dimensionless "Bagnold number" and "Bagnold formula" for characterising sand flow. He gave a constitutive relation for a suspension of neutrally buoyant particles in a Newtonian fluid. He also proposed a model for "singing sands" and made contributions to the science of Sedimentology. Bagnold was associated with the Imperial College London Department of Civil Engineering, where his work intersected engineering and geomorphology. His work received a number of awards. He was the 1969 recipient of the G. K. Warren Prize from the National Academy of Sciences. In 1971 he received the Wollaston Medal, the highest award granted by the Geological Society of London, and in 1981 the David Linton Award of the British Geomorphological Research Group. He was elected a Foreign Honorary Member of the American Academy of Arts and Sciences in 1974. Other awards included the 1970 Penrose Medal by the Geological Society of America; and the Sorby Medal from the International Association of Sedimentologists. He also received honorary D.Sc. degrees from both the University of East Anglia and the Danish University of Aarhus.

== Death ==
In his final years, Bagnold lived in Blackheath, South East London. He died at Hither Green on 28 May 1990 at the age of 94.

== Personal life ==
Bagnold married Dorothy on 8 May 1946 at Rottingdean in East Sussex, and had a son and a daughter.

== Honours and awards ==
- Founder's Medal of the Royal Geographical Society, 1935
- Officer of the Order of the British Empire 8 July 1941
- Mentioned in Despatches 2 January 1917, 1 September 1931, 30 December 1941
- Knight, Order of Leopold with palm (Belgium), 5 April 1919, etc.

== List of publications ==
1. Bagnold, R.A. 1931. Journeys in the Libyan Desert, 1929 and 1930. The Geographical Journal 78(1):13–39; (6):524–533.
2. Bagnold, R.A. 1933. A further journey through the Libyan Desert. The Geographical Journal 82(2):103–129; (3):211–213, 226–235.
3. Bagnold, R.A. 1935. The movement of desert sand. The Geographical Journal 85(4):342–365.
4. Bagnold, R.A. 1935. Libyan Sands. London: Travel Book Club, 351 pp.
5. Bagnold, R.A. 1936. The movement of desert sand. Proceedings of the Royal Society of London A 157(892):594–620.
6. Bagnold, R.A. 1937. The transport of sand by wind. The Geographical Journal 89(5):409–438.
7. Bagnold, R.A. 1937. The size-grading of sand by wind. Proceedings of the Royal Society of London A 163(913):250–264.
8. Bagnold, R.A. 1938. Grain structure of sand dunes in relation to water content. Nature 142(3591):403–404.
9. Bagnold, R.A. 1938. The measurement of sand storms. Proceedings of the Royal Society of London A 167(929):282–290.
10. Bagnold, R.A. 1939. A lost world refound. Scientific American 161(5, November):261–263.
11. Bagnold, R.A. 1939. Committee on wave pressures: interim report on wave-pressure research. Journal of the Institution of Civil Engineers 12:201–226.
12. Bagnold, R.A., Myers, O.H., Peel, R.F. and Winkler, H.A. 1939. An expedition to the Gilf Kebir and 'Uweinat, 1938. The Geographical Journal 93(4):281–313.
13. Bagnold, R.A. 1940. Beach formation by waves: some model experiments in a wave tank. Journal of the Institute of Civil Engineers 15(5237):27–53.
14. Bagnold, R.A. 1941. The Physics of Blown Sand and Desert Dunes. London: Methuen, 265 pp.
15. Bagnold, R.A. 1945. Early days of the Long Range Desert Group. The Geographical Journal 105(1–2):30–42.
16. Bagnold, R.A. 1946. Motion of waves in shallow water. Interaction between waves and sand bottoms. Proceedings of the Royal Society of London A 187:1–18.
17. Bagnold, R.A. 1947. Sand movement by waves: some small-scale experiments with sand of very low density. Journal of the Institute of Civil Engineers 27(5554):447–469.
18. Bagnold, R.A. 1951. Measurement of very low velocities of water flow. Nature 167:1025–1027.
19. Bagnold, R.A. 1951. The movement of a cohesionless granular bed by fluid flow over it. British Journal of Applied Physics 2(2):29–34.
20. Bagnold, R.A. 1951. Some problems of desert physics. Bulletin de l'Institut Fouad premier du désert 1(2):27–34.
21. Bagnold, R.A. 1951. The sand formations in southern Arabia. The Geographical Journal 117(1):78–86.
22. Bagnold, R.A. 1953. Navigating ashore. Journal of the Institute of Navigation 6:184–193.
23. Bagnold, R.A. 1953. Forme des dunes de sable et régime des vents. In: Actions éoliennes, phénomènes d'évaporation et d'hydrologie superficielle dans les régions arides, Centre national de la Recherche scientifique (CNRS), Paris, Colloques internationaux 35, pp. 23–32.
24. Bagnold, R.A. 1953. The surface movement of blown sand in relation to meteorology. In: Desert Research, Proceedings of the International Symposium, Jerusalem, 7–14 May 1952, Research Council of Israel, Special Publication 2, pp. 89–93.
25. Bagnold, R.A. 1954. Physical aspects of dry deserts. In: Cloudsley-Thompson, J.L. (ed). Biology of Deserts, Proceedings of a symposium held in London, 1952, Institute of Biology, London, pp. 7–12.
26. Bagnold, R.A. 1954. Experiments on a gravity-free dispersion of large solid spheres in a Newtonian fluid under shear. Proceedings of the Royal Society of London A 225(1160):49–63.
27. Bagnold, R.A. 1955. Some flume experiments on large grains but little denser than the transporting fluid, and their implications. Proceedings of the Institution of Civil Engineers 4(3):174–205.
28. Bagnold, R.A. 1956. The flow of cohesionless grains in fluids. Philosophical Transactions of the Royal Society of London A 249(964):235–297.
29. Bagnold, R.A. 1960. The re-entrainment of settled dust. International Journal of Air Pollution 2(3):357–363.
30. Bagnold, R.A. 1960. Some aspects of shape of river meanders. United States Geological Survey, Professional Paper 282-E, pp. 135–144.
31. Bagnold, R.A. 1960. Sediment discharge and stream power; a preliminary announcement. US geol. Surv. Circular 421.
32. Leopold, L.B., Bagnold, R.A., Wollman, M.G. and Brush, L.M. 1960. Flow resistance in sinuous or irregular channels. United States Geological Survey, Professional Paper 282-D, pp. 111–134.
33. Bagnold, R.A. 1962. Saltation (air and water). In: Thewlis, J. (ed), Encyclopaedic dictionary of physics, Volume 6, Oxford: Pergamon Press, pp. 370–371.
34. Bagnold, R.A. 1962. Transport of sand by wind. In: Thewlis, J. (ed), Encyclopaedic dictionary of physics, Volume 7, Oxford: Pergamon Press, pp. 436–440.
35. Bagnold, R.A. 1962. Auto-suspension of transported sediment; turbidity currents. Proceedings of the Royal Society of London A 265:315–319.
36. Bagnold, R.A. 1963. Beach and nearshore processes – Part 1, Mechanics of marine sedimentation. In: Hill, M.N. (ed.), The sea – ideas and observations on progress in the study of the sea. New York and London: Interscience Wiley, vol. 3, pp. 507–528.
37. Inman, D.L. and Bagnold, R.A. 1963. Beach and nearshore processes – Part 2, Littoral processes. In: Hill, M.N. (ed), The sea – ideas and observations on progress in the study of the sea. New York and London: Interscience Wiley, vol. 3, pp. 529–553.
38. Bagnold, R.A. 1966. The shearing and dilation of dry sand and the "singing" mechanism. Proceedings of the Royal Society of London A 295(1442):219–232.
39. Bagnold, R.A. 1966. An approach to the sediment transport problem from general physics. United States Department of the Interior, US Geological Survey, Professional Paper 422-I, 37 pp.
40. Smith, W.O., Olsen, H.W., Bagnold, R.A. and Rice, J.C. 1966. Certain flows of air and water in sands during infiltrations. Soil Science 101(6):441–449.
41. Bagnold, R.A. 1968. Deposition in the process of hydraulic transport. Sedimentology 10(1):45–56.
42. Bagnold, R.A. 1971. Response to presentation of the 1970 Penrose Medal. Geological Society of America Bulletin 82:xiii-xvii.
43. Bagnold, R.A. 1971. Singing sands. In: Thewlis, J. (ed), Encyclopaedic dictionary of physics, Volume 4, Oxford: Pergamon Press, pp. 408–410.
44. Bagnold, R.A. 1973. The nature of saltation and of "bed-load" transport in water. Proceedings of the Royal Society of London A 332(1591):473–504.
45. Bagnold, R.A. 1974. Fluid forces on a body in shear-flow: Experimental use of 'stationary flow'. Proceedings of the Royal Society of London A 340(1621):147–171.
46. Sagan, C. and Bagnold, R.A. 1975. Fluid transport on Earth and aeolian transport on Mars. Icarus 26(2):209–218.
47. Bagnold, R.A. 1977. Bed load transport by natural rivers. Water Resources Research 13:303–312.
48. Bagnold, R.A. 1979. Sediment transport by wind and water. Nordic Hydrology 10(5):309–322.
49. Bagnold, R.A. 1980. An empirical correlation of bedload transport rates in flumes and natural rivers. Proceedings of the Royal Society of London A 372(1751):453–473.
50. Bagnold, R.A. and Barndorff-Nielsen, O.E. 1980. The pattern of natural size distributions. Sedimentology 27(2):199–207.
51. Bagnold, R.A. 1983. The nature and correlation of random distributions. Proceedings of the Royal Society of London A 388(1795):273–291.
52. Bagnold, R.A. 1985. Transport of granular solids by wind and water compared. In: Barndorff-Nielsen, O., Møller, J.-T., Rasmussen, K.R. and Willetts, B.B. (eds), Proceedings of the International Workshop on the Physics of Blown Sand, 28–31 May, University of Aarhus, Department of Theoretical Statistics, Institute of Mathematics, Memoir 8, pp. 1–8.
53. Bagnold, R.A. 1986. Transport of solids by natural water flow: evidence for a worldwide correlation. Proceedings of the Royal Society of London A 405(1829):369–374.
54. Bagnold, R.A. 1988 Concluding remarks. In: Thorne, C.R., MacArthur R.C. and Bradley, J.B. (eds), The Physics of Sediment Transport, A Collection of Hallmark Papers by R. A. Bagnold. New York: American Society of Civil Engineers, Hydraulics Division, Book number 665, pp. 352–353.
55. Bagnold, R.A. 1990. Sand, Wind, and War; Memoirs of a Desert Explorer. Tucson: University of Arizona Press, ISBN 978-0-8165-1211-9, 202 pp.

== See also ==
- Aeolian processes
- Bagnold formula
- Bagnold number
- Bill Kennedy Shaw
- Guy Lenox Prendergast
- Pat Clayton

Military offices
New creation	Commander, Long Range Desert Group; 3 July 1940 – November 1941	Succeeded by Guy Lenox Prendergast
