= Mourdi Depression =

Desert depression in Chad

Coordinates: 18°2′24″N 21°4′47″E

Topographic Map of the Ennedi Plateau with the Mourdi Depression

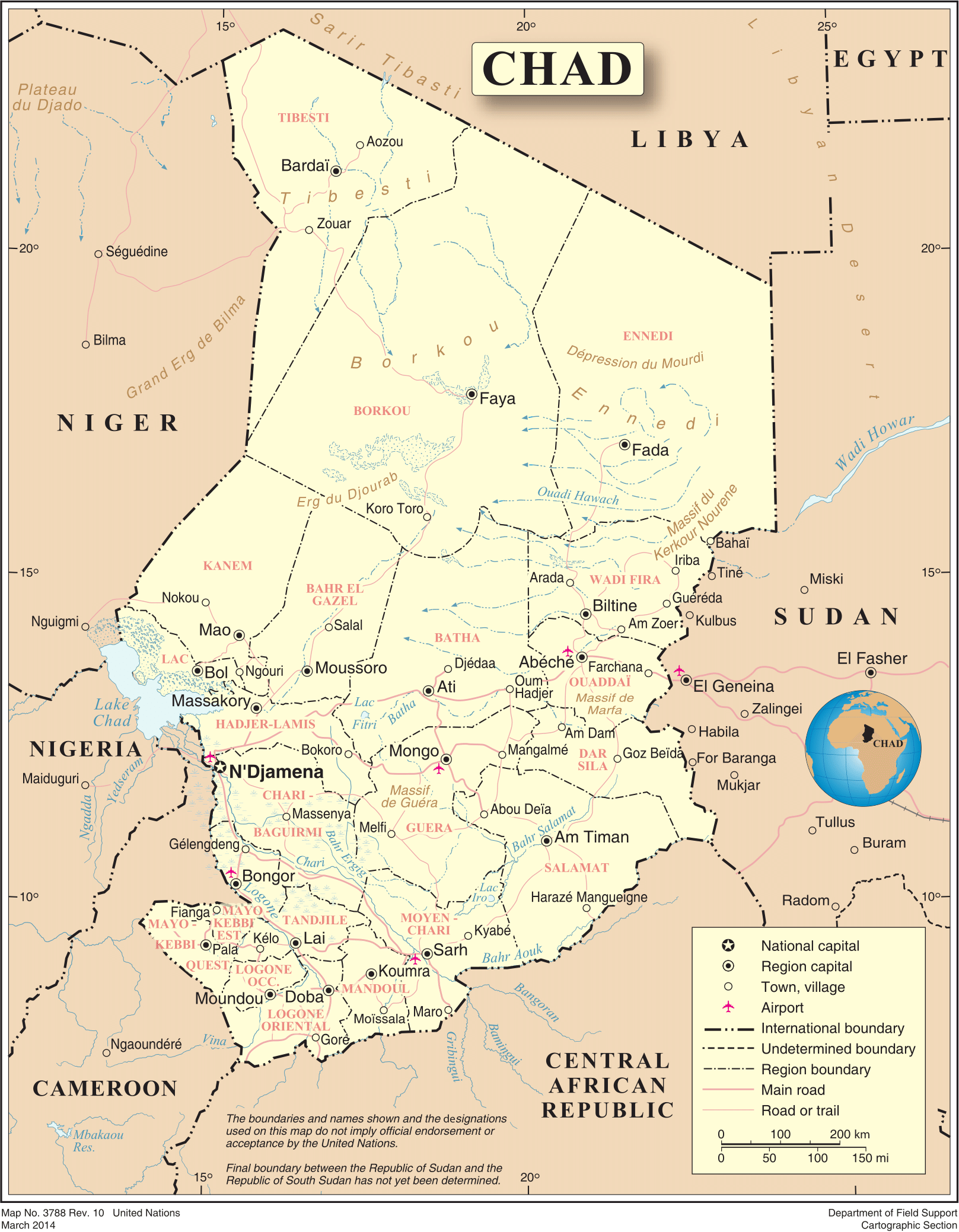
Location in Chad

The Mourdi Depression is a prominent desert depression of northeastern Chad. It lies adjacent to the Ennedi Plateau. The cleft lies "between the Erdi plateau and the eastern slopes of Ennedi, and the mouth of the Wadi Guroguro." The depression is characterized by a rocky valley, about 30 miles (48 km) wide from north to south, sloping from an altitude of about 1,800 feet (550 m) down towards the west to Djourab.

== Geography ==
The Mourdi Depression lies along a trading route from Abéché to Kurfa. The route passes Tiné, then veers north to Bao, before passing through the Mourdi Depression and Erdi Ma. The Mourdi Depression is also along a fisherman's route for reaching the northeast of Lake Chad by traveling through the Erdi Plateau and Ennedi gap via the depression. The Wadi N'kaola in situated within the Mourdi Depression, and the nearest major town is Fada to the southwest. Small barchans (crescent-shaped dunes) are noted here.

The main settlements of the depression are Diona, a small town along the edge of a river, and Tébi, both of which have mobile towers.

== Culture ==
The depression is cited as one of the most important Saharan grazing grounds. There are numerous rock paintings in the area. The depression was explored by R. A. Bagnold, a pioneer in desert explorations in 1932. During this first motorized expedition in 1932, he found implements on the northern scarp, dated to the Lower Palaeolithic and Middle Palaeolithic period in the valley. In the piste, next to the depression and in the northern rock formations of Ennedi, are rock arches; the Guela d'Archei and its colony of dwarf crocodiles are of particular note. Addax, a critically endangered species, is found in small numbers in this depression.

== Gallery ==
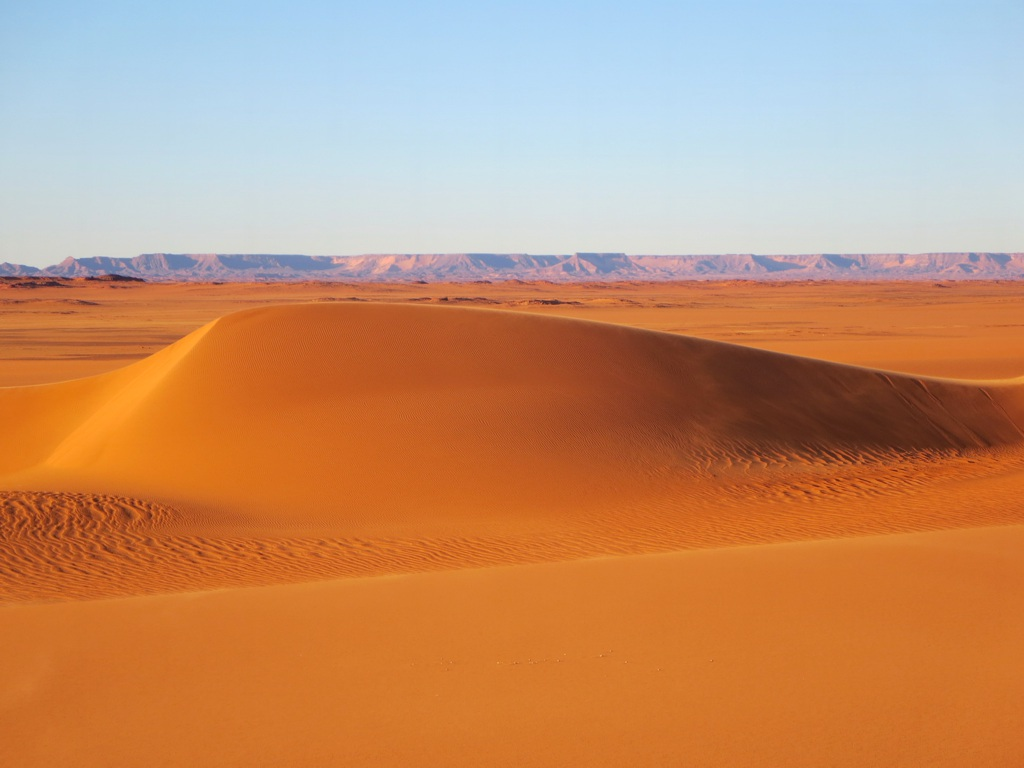
Landscape of the depression

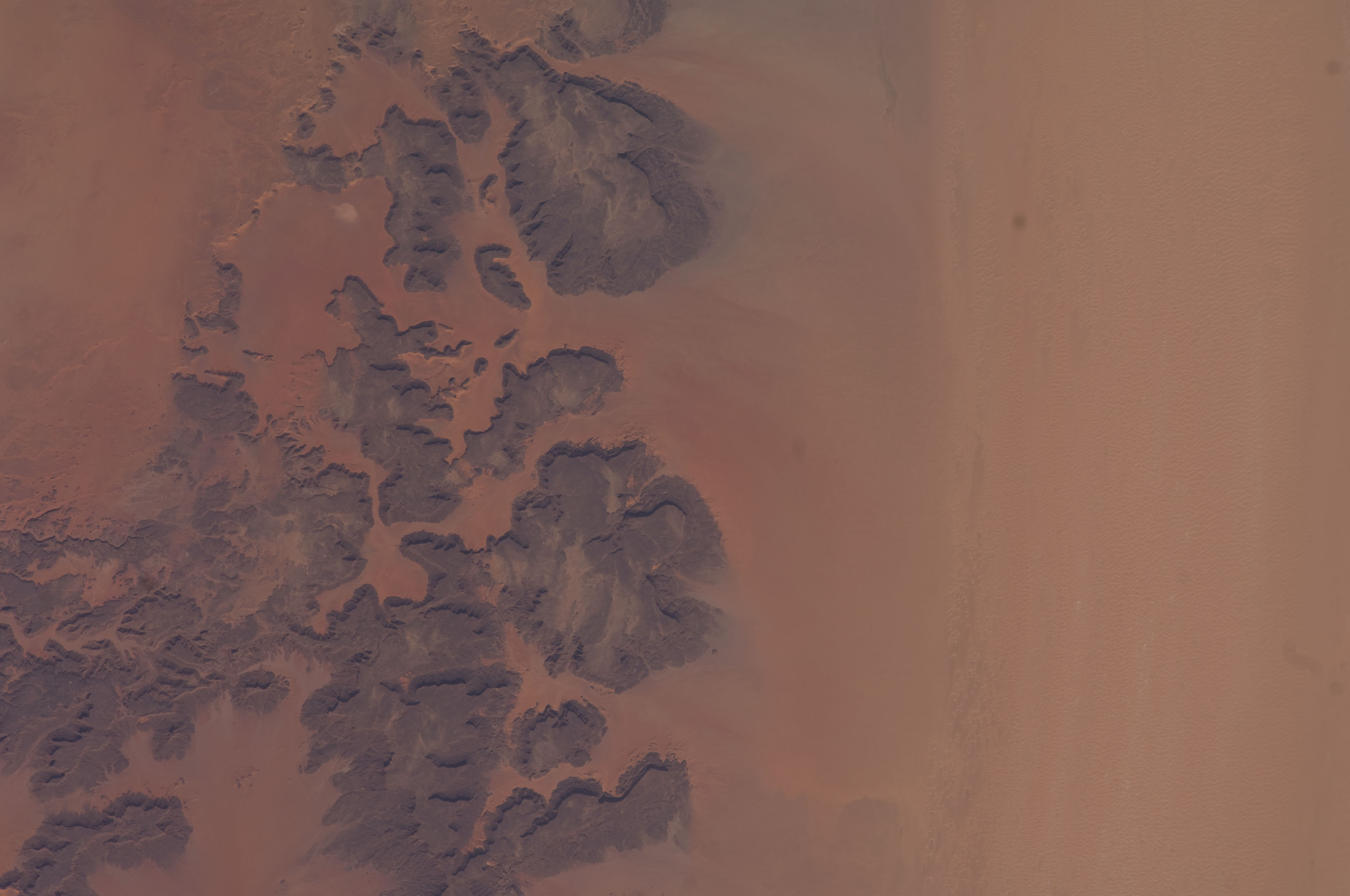
Aerial of Tagoulicha Ridge on the northern edge of the depression
