= Aeolian landform =

Landforms produced by action of the wind

Aeolian landforms, or Eolian landforms, are produced by either the erosive or depositive action of wind. These features may be built up from sand or snow, or eroded into rock, snow, or ice.

Aeolian landforms are commonly observed in sandy deserts and on frozen lakes or sea ice and have been observed and studied around Earth and on other planets, including Mars and Pluto.

== Terminology ==
The word "aeolian" derives from Æolus, the Greek god of the winds, and the son of Hellen and the nymph Orseis, and a brother of Dorus, Xuthus and Amphictyon.

== Mechanisms ==
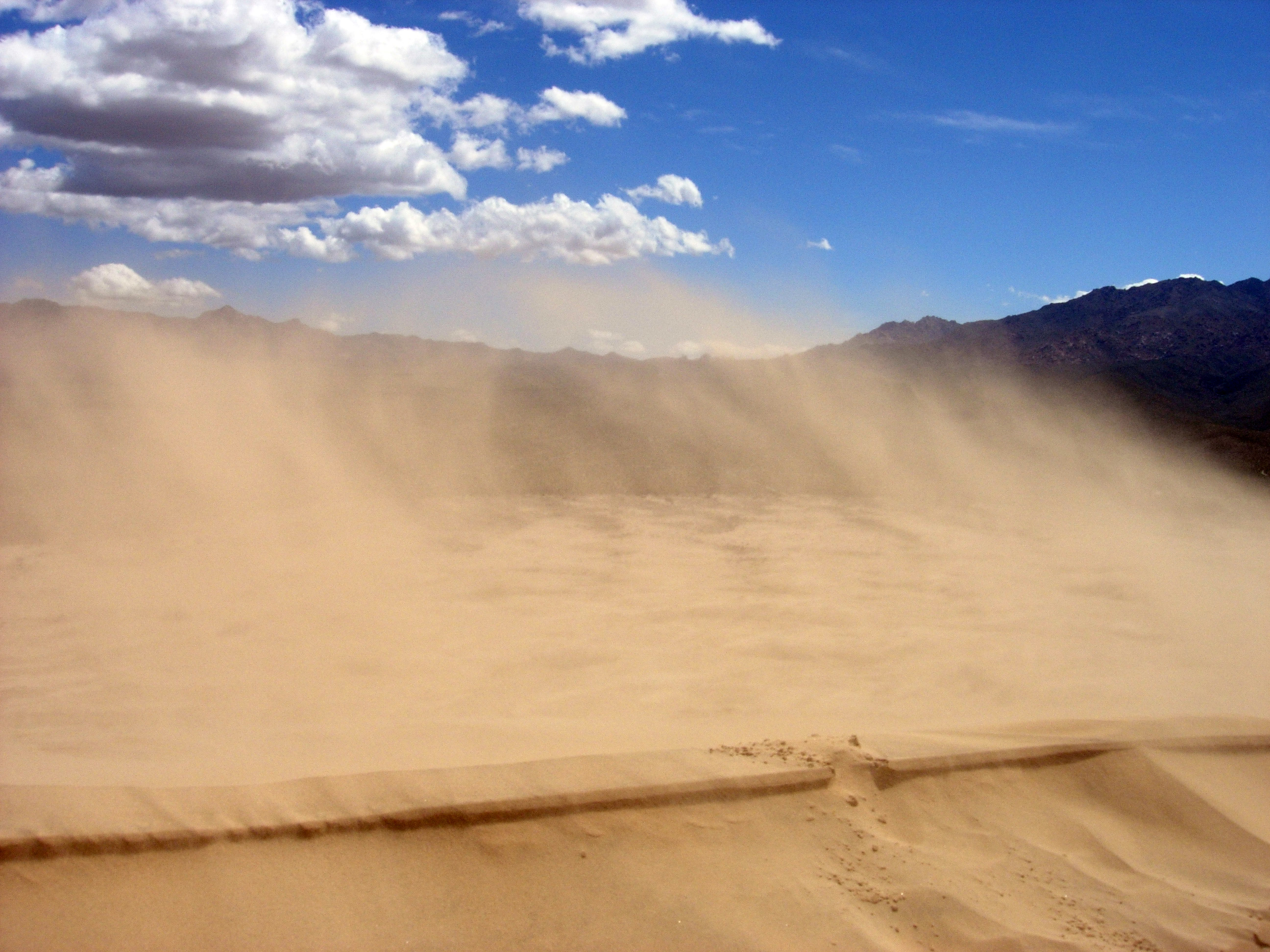
Sand blowing off a crest in the Kelso Dunes of the Mojave Desert, California.

Aeolian landforms are formed when wind moves sediment (See also: Aeolian processes). Sediment particles move when they are lifted by upwards Bernoulli forces that exceed their downwards weight or when they are dragged from their initial position. Depending on the balance of these forces, particles may either roll across the surface until they settle due to a loss of velocity; hop from point to point; or be suspended entirely in the air. These means of sediment transport can be classified as creep, saltation, and suspension, respectively. Once sediment transport begins, it continues via gravity and momentum. Particles that fall out of the air typically impact the surface with enough force to dislodge further particles.

These impacts are separated in space by the saltation hop length of the traveling particles, which creates distinct areas of erosion and/or deposition. As time passes, the surface rises in areas with net deposition, and lowers in areas with net erosion, creating initial landforms. Larger aeolian landforms alter the surface wind field in patterns that promote their growth. They are thus very stable, once formed.

Deflation and abrasion are specific means of sediment transport than can also be attributed to aeolian processes. Deflation, which is named for the Latin word "deflare" meaning "to blow away", refers to the scattering and removal of rock particles by wind. Deflation occurs in deserts where diverse particles dominate the surface. In these arid zones, sand and rock fragments are blown by jets and streams of air which remove fine grained materials from the surface and leave behind a rocky desert. Abrasion is another mechanism of force exerted by the wind on surficial materials that is characterized by friction caused by moving particles scraping across a rock's surface and, as a result, continues to develop a land formation by removing further material.

Aeolian landforms are typically described in two categories: erosional and depositional.

== Types of landforms ==
=== Depositional ===
Depositional landforms grow when sediment is deposited into an area faster than it is removed. These landforms grow from snow, sand, and/or dust in areas where wind patterns trap particles. For example, the Great Sand Dunes in Colorado grow as sand blown from a wide plain is deposited against the edge of the Sangre de Cristo mountains. Some depositional landforms include dunes, barchan dunes, ripple marks, and loess.

Examples of Depositional Landforms
Landform	Description	Image
Dunes	A dune is a large pile of wind-blown material, typically sand or snow. As the pile accumulates, its larger surface area increases the rate of deposition in a positive feedback loop until the dune collapses under its own weight. This process causes dunes to move in the direction of the wind over time.	Death Valley Mesquite Flats sand dunes.
Barchan	A type of dune that forms as a result of low sediment supply in regions where wind blows in one primary direction. This causes the dune to have a concave shape, with the tails facing downwind. Transverse dunes and Seif dunes are some alternative examples of the effect of unidirectional air flow on dune formation.	Barchan dune schematic.
Ripple marks	Ripple marks are small ridges of sediment that form due to wind or water blowing over loose sediment in either a current or wave pattern. Aeolian ripples result from high velocity winds which form fine, well-sorted grain particles into long, flat, asymmetrical ripples.	Asymmetrical wind ripples on aragonite sand from San Salvador Island in the Bahamas.
Loess	Silt sized particles that can be carried by the wind over extensive distances, usually homogenous and highly porous. Generally, loess contains angular grains that are not well-polished due to the nature of their transport.	Loess hills in western Iowa.
Desert varnish	A coating that can be found on the surface of desert rocks that can only be explained by the presence of clay particles which have been transported by wind. The discoloration of the clays can most often be attributed to black manganese oxides and red iron oxides.	Desert varnish in Valley of Fire State Park.

=== Erosional ===
Erosional landforms grow when more sediment is removed from an area faster than it is deposited. They are widespread in hardened, wind-swept snow surfaces, such as the Antarctic Plateau: see sastrugi. In sand and rock, they are rarely preserved except in arid regions. Outside of arid regions, moving water - which is heavier and more erosive than wind - erases aeolian landforms. Large basins are complex and there is often one or more non-aeolian process at work, including tectonics, glacial and alluvial forces. There are several types of landforms associated with erosion.

Examples of Erosional Landforms
Landform	Description	Image
Deflation basin	A depression in the land that can be found in deserts due to the removal of particles by wind; it can also be referred to as a "blowout".	Blowout outside of Earth, Texas
Ventifacts	Rock samples that demonstrate the erosion caused by aeolian processes over time. Erosional processes by wind can result in smoothing and polishing as well as the creation of grooves.	Hematite rich ventifact from Windy Gap, Wyoming with extensive polishing by wind.
Mushroom rocks	Formations that develop over thousands of years when the top of an outcrop is eroded by wind at a slower rate than the base of the outcrop.	Mushroom rocks from northern Arizona.
Desert pavement (Lag deposit)	Rocks and sand grains that form a pavement due to deflation (winnowing). Wind removes sediment grains that it is capable of transporting away from an area, causing larger grains to accumulate on that surface. Lag deposits can also form due to removal of finer particles by water.	Desert pavement from the Mojave Desert.
Yardangs	A protruding rock that results from a streamlined carving from consolidated material by wind abrasion by dust and sand, and deflation.	Yardangs in dunes at White Sands National Park in New Mexico.

== See also ==
- Barchan – Crescent-shaped dune
- Blowout (geomorphology) – Depressions in a sand dune ecosystem caused by the removal of sediments by wind
- Desert pavement – Type of desert earth surface
- Dune – Hill of loose sand built by aeolian processes or the flow of water
- Erg (landform) – Broad area of desert covered with wind-swept sand
- Loess – Sediment of accumulated wind-blown dust
- Médanos (geology)
- Paha (landform) – Type of loess hill
- Ripple marks – Wave structures created in sediments by bottom current
- Sink (geography), also known as playa – Closed drainage basin that has no outflow
- Sandhill – Type of ecological community or xeric wildfire-maintained ecosystem
- Sastrugi – Sharp irregular grooves or ridges formed on a snow surface
- Tukulan – Land forms in Yakutia, Russian Federation
