= Eamonn Gearon =

British Arabist and author

Eamonn Gearon is an author, Arabist, and analyst. Gearon's career goal has been the development of understanding and insight between the Greater Middle East and the West. Gearon is best known for his book The Sahara: A Cultural History (2011).

Gearon is also a desert explorer. In 1997, he began his lifelong education in desert survival, navigation and camel husbandry. Initially studying under the Bedu in western Egypt, Eamonn Gearon went on to pursue solo, camel-powered explorations in the Egyptian Sahara.

== Education ==
Gearon has a B.Th. degree from the University of Southampton and an MA in Near and Middle Eastern Studies and Arabic from SOAS (School of Oriental and African Studies), the University of London.

== Career ==
Gearon has written articles dealing with history, politics and social affairs across the Greater Middle East. His work has appeared in publications such as The Daily Telegraph, The Independent, Times Literary Supplement, History Today, Al-Ahram, Geographical, New Internationalist, and The London Magazine.

Gearon briefs business intelligence organisations and writes for the Jane's group, Middle East International, and the Middle East magazine.

=== Film ===
Gearon wrote, produced and directed the documentary film A Mother's Love. Shot entirely on location in post-genocide Rwanda, the film explores the life of Rosamond Carr, an American who lived in Rwanda for 50 years, and founded the Imbabazi Orphanage.

=== Lectures ===
Eamonn Gearon lectures on various topics, including the history, politics and current affairs of the Greater Middle East.

He has lectured, among other venues, at the Universities of OxfordEdinburgh, Royal Scots Club, London School of Economics, and the American University in Cairo; as a speaker on the RMS Queen Mary 2 and for other groups, such as Rotary International and Lions Clubs International.

== Bibliography ==
=== Author ===
- The Sahara: A Cultural History, 2011.

=== Contributor ===
- Meetings With Remarkable Muslims, 2005 (ed. Barnaby Rogerson and Rose Baring).
- An Encyclopaedia of African History, 2004 (ed. Kevin Shillington).
- Sahara Overland, 2004 (ed. Chris Scott).
