= Bagnold number =

Dimensionless number in fluid dynamics

The Bagnold number (Ba) is the ratio of grain collision stresses to viscous fluid stresses in a granular flow with interstitial Newtonian fluid, first identified by Ralph Alger Bagnold.

The Bagnold number is defined by

$\mathrm{Ba}=\frac{\rho d^2 \lambda^{1/2} \dot{\gamma}}{\mu}$,

where $\rho$ is the particle density, $d$ is the grain diameter, $\dot{\gamma}$ is the shear rate and $\mu$ is the dynamic viscosity of the interstitial fluid. The parameter $\lambda$ is known as the linear concentration, and is given by

$$\lambda=\frac{1}{\left(\phi_0 / \phi\right)^{\frac{1}{3}} - 1}$$,

where $\phi$ is the solids fraction and $\phi_0$ is the maximum possible concentration (see random close packing).

In flows with small Bagnold numbers (Ba < 40), viscous fluid stresses dominate grain collision stresses, and the flow is said to be in the "macro-viscous" regime. Grain collision stresses dominate at large Bagnold number (Ba > 450), which is known as the "grain-inertia" regime. A transitional regime falls between these two values.

== See also ==
- Bingham plastic
