= Big Hollow =

Big Hollow may refer to:

- Big Hollow School District 38, in Illinois, United States, contains Big Hollow Primary, Elementary, and Middle School on one campus
- Big Hollow (Wisconsin), a valley in Sauk County
- The Big Hollow (Wyoming), Wind eroded depression in Wyoming in the United States
- Big Hollow is also the name of over 130 canyons and valleys in the United States.
- Big Chicken Hollow
