= Aeolian processes =

Processes due to wind activity

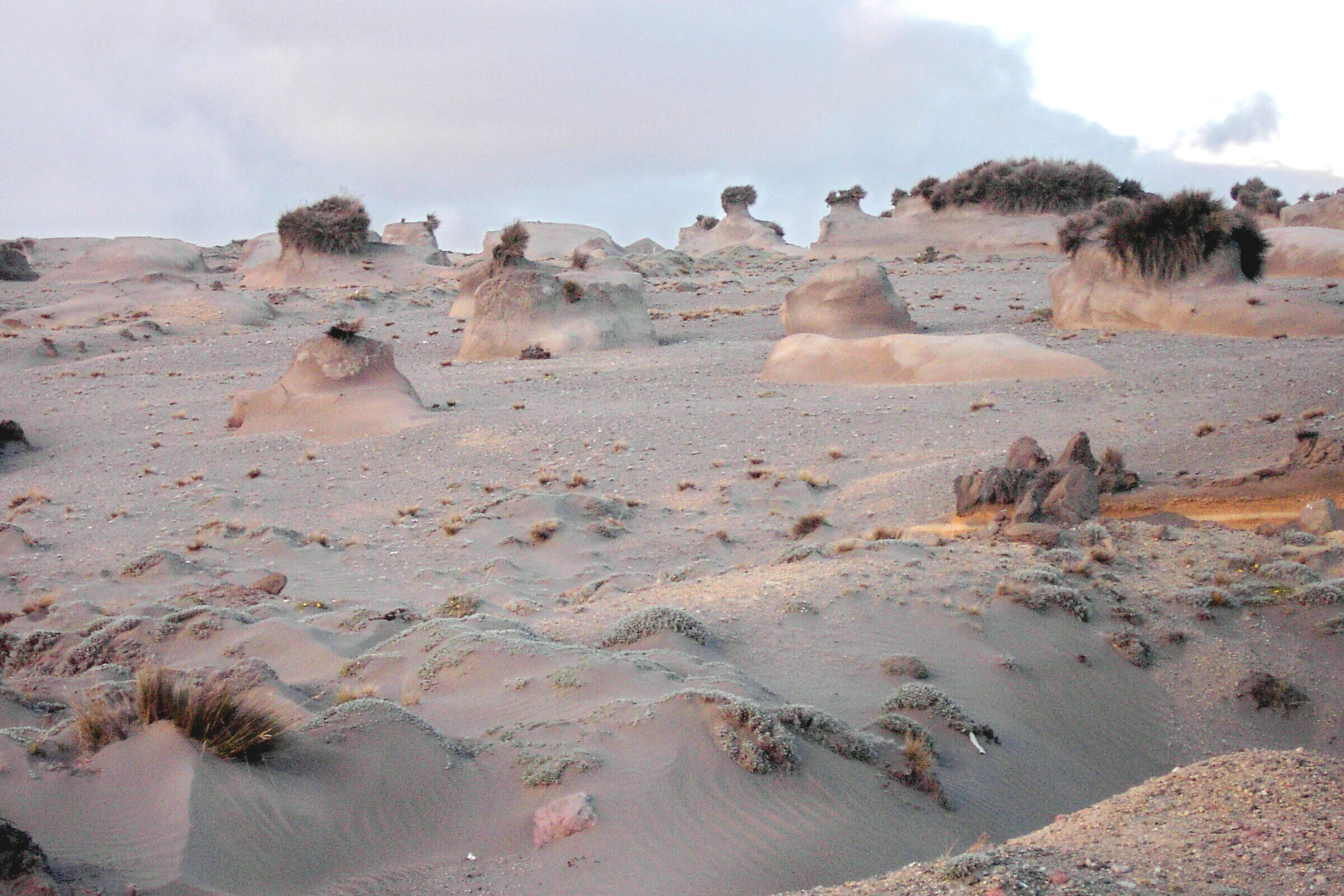
Wind erosion of soil at the foot of Chimborazo, Ecuador

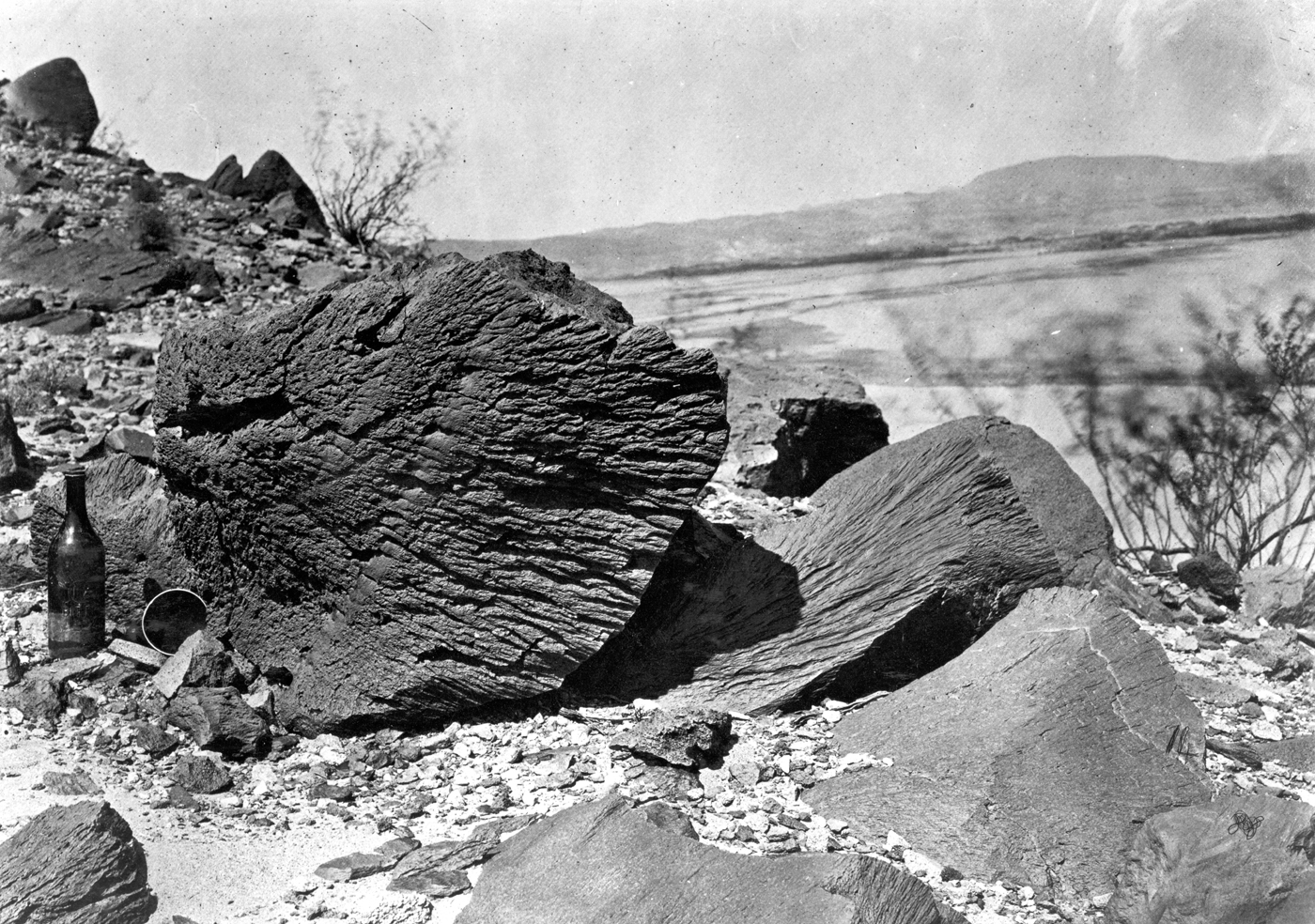
Rock carved by drifting sand below Fortification Rock in Arizona (photo by Timothy H. O'Sullivan, USGS, 1871)

Aeolian processes, also spelled eolian, pertains to wind activity in the study of geology and weather and specifically to the wind's ability to shape the surface of the Earth (or other planets). Winds may erode, transport, and deposit materials. They are effective agents in regions with sparse vegetation, a lack of soil moisture and a large supply of unconsolidated sediments. Although water is a much more powerful eroding force than wind, aeolian processes are important in arid environments such as deserts.

The term is derived from the name of the Greek god Aeolus, the keeper of the winds.

== Definition and setting ==
Aeolian processes are those processes of erosion, transport, and deposition of sediments that are caused by wind at or near the surface of the earth. Sediment deposits produced by the action of wind and the sedimentary structures characteristic of these deposits are also described as aeolian.

Aeolian processes are most important in areas where there is little or no vegetation. However, aeolian deposits are not restricted to arid climates. They are also seen along shorelines; Along stream courses in semiarid climates; in areas of ample sand weathered from weakly cemented sandstone outcrops; and in areas of glacial outwash.

Loess, which is silt deposited by wind, is common in humid to subhumid climates. Much of North America and Europe are underlain by sand and loess of Pleistocene age originating from glacial outwash.

The lee (downwind) side of river valleys in semiarid regions are often blanketed with sand and sand dunes. Examples in North America include the Platte, Arkansas, and Missouri Rivers.

== Wind erosion ==
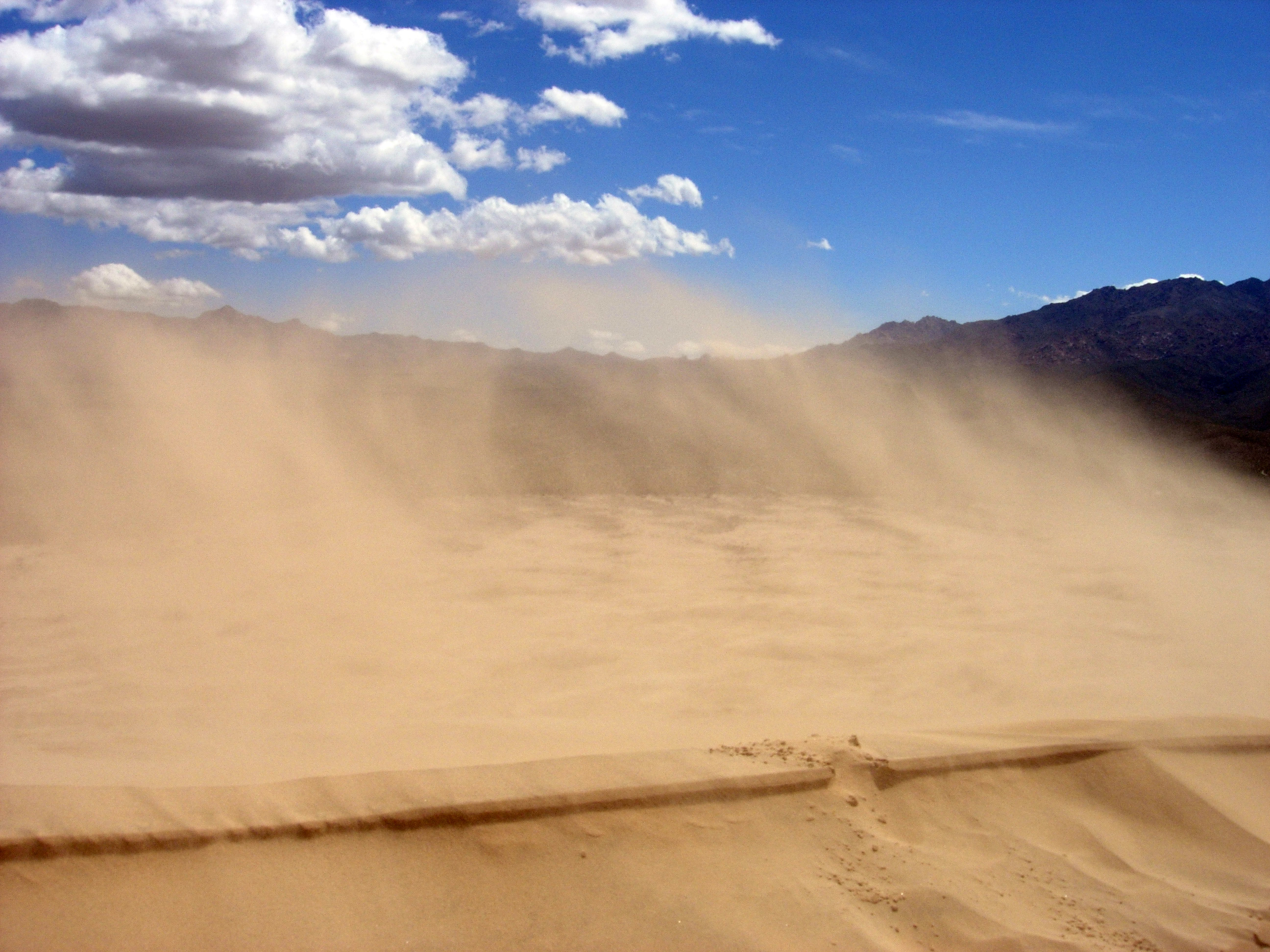
Sand blowing off a crest in the Kelso Dunes of the Mojave Desert, California

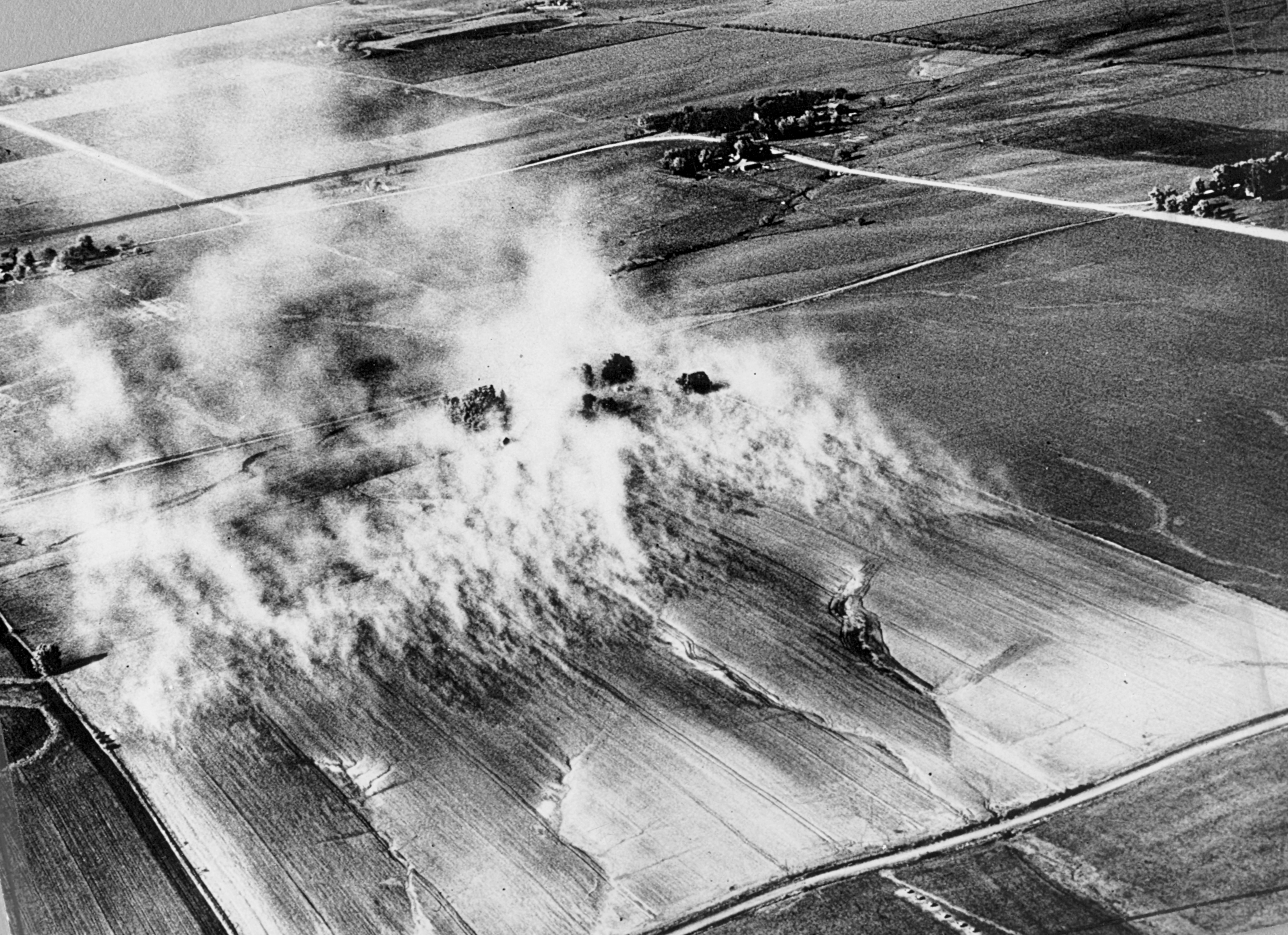
Dust blown by the wind from an Iowa field that was not planted, 1890.

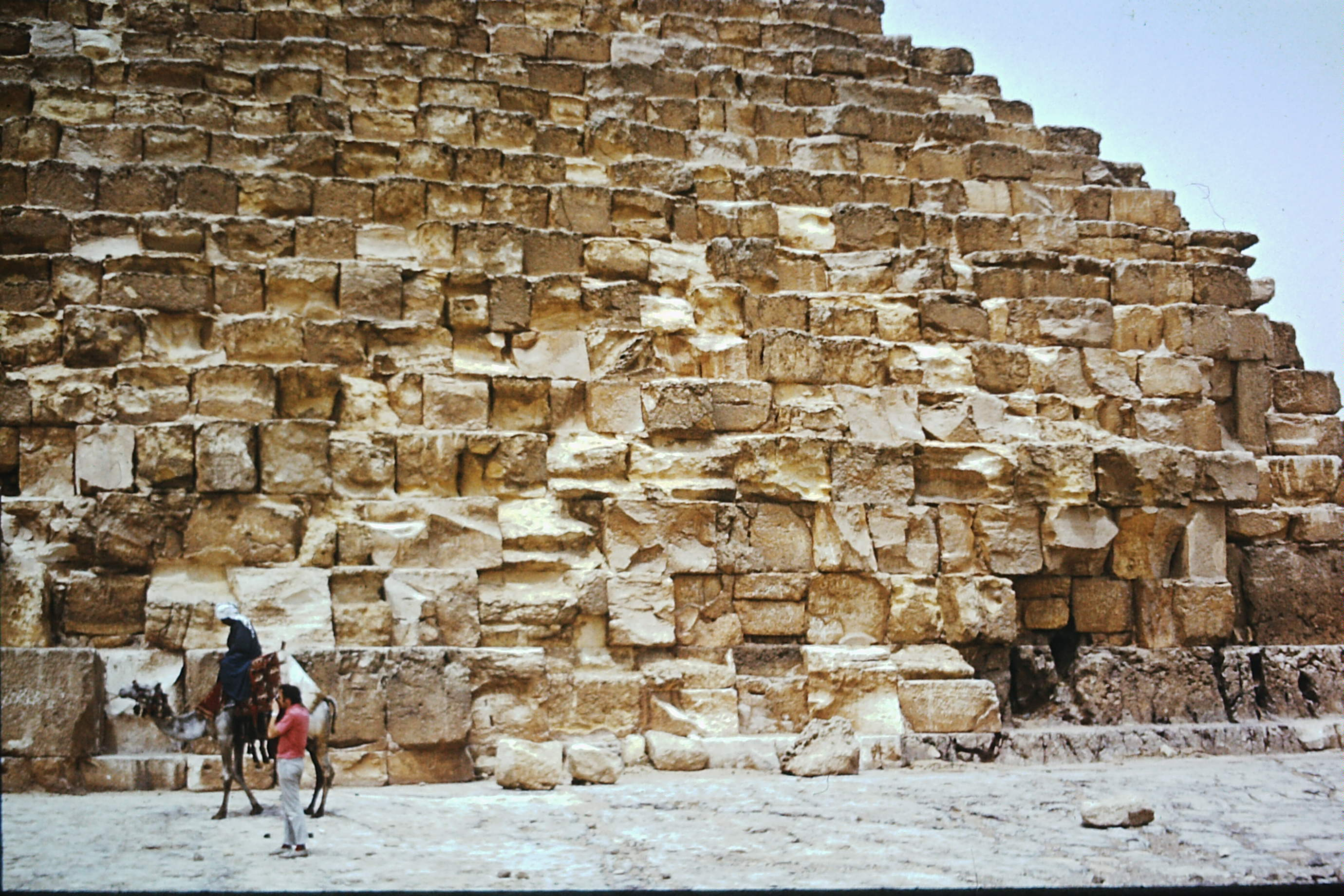
Effects of wind erosion at Giza pyramid, May 1972

Wind erodes the Earth's surface by deflation (the removal of loose, fine-grained particles by the turbulent action of the wind) and by abrasion (the wearing down of surfaces by the grinding action and sandblasting by windborne particles). Once entrained in the wind, collisions between particles further break them down, a process called attrition.

Worldwide, erosion by water is more important than erosion by wind, but wind erosion is important in semiarid and arid regions. Wind erosion is increased by some human activities, such as the use of 4x4 vehicles.

=== Deflation ===
Deflation is the lifting and removal of loose material from the surface by wind turbulence. It takes place by three mechanisms: traction/surface creep, saltation, and suspension. Traction or surface creep is a process of larger grains sliding or rolling across the surface. Saltation refers to particles bouncing across the surface for short distances. Suspended particles are fully entrained in the wind, which carries them for long distances. Saltation likely accounts for 50–70 % of deflation, while suspension accounts for 30–40 % and surface creep accounts for 5–25 %.

Regions which experience intense and sustained erosion are called deflation zones. Most aeolian deflation zones are composed of desert pavement, a sheet-like surface of rock fragments that remains after wind and water have removed the fine particles. The rock mantle in desert pavements protects the underlying material from further deflation. Areas of desert pavement form the regs or stony deserts of the Sahara. These are further divided into rocky areas called hamadas and areas of small rocks and gravel called serirs. Desert pavement is extremely common in desert environments.

Blowouts are hollows formed by wind deflation. Blowouts are generally small, but may be up to several kilometers in diameter. The smallest are mere dimples 0.3 meters (1 ft) deep and 3 meters (10 ft) in diameter. The largest include the blowout hollows of Mongolia, which can be 8 kilometers (5 mi) across and 60 to 100 meters (200 to 400 ft) deep. Big Hollow in Wyoming, US, extends 14 by 9.7 kilometers (9 by 6 mi) and is up to 90 meters (300 ft) deep.

=== Abrasion ===
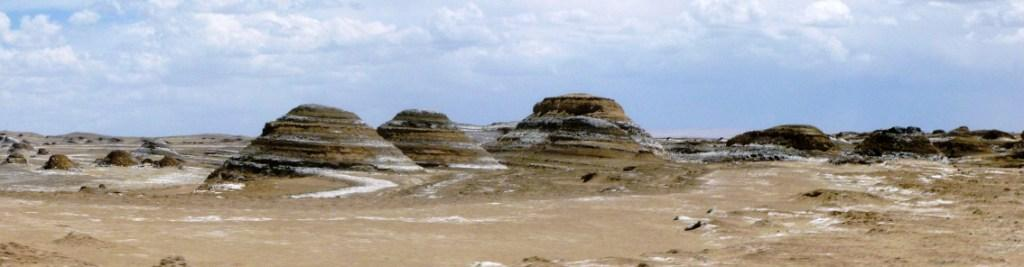
Yardangs in the Qaidam Desert, Qinghai Province, China

Abrasion (also sometimes called corrasion) is the process of wind-driven grains knocking or wearing material off of landforms. It was once considered a major contributor to desert erosion, but by the mid-20th Century, it had come to be considered much less important. Wind can normally lift sand only a short distance, with most windborne sand remaining within 50 centimeters (20 in) of the surface and practically none normally being carried above 2 meters (6 ft). Many desert features once attributed to wind abrasion, including wind caves, mushroom rocks, and the honeycomb weathering called tafoni, are now attributed to differential weathering, rainwash, deflation rather than abrasion, or other processes.

Yardangs are one kind of desert feature that is widely attributed to wind abrasion. These are rock ridges, up to tens of meters high and kilometers long, that have been streamlined by desert winds. Yardangs characteristically show elongated furrows or grooves aligned with the prevailing wind. They form mostly in softer material such as silts.

Abrasion produces polishing and pitting, grooving, shaping, and faceting of exposed surfaces. These are widespread in arid environments but geologically insignificant. Polished or faceted surfaces called ventifacts are rare, requiring abundant sand, powerful winds, and a lack of vegetation for their formation.

In parts of Antarctica wind-blown snowflakes that are technically sediments have also caused abrasion of exposed rocks.

=== Attrition ===
Attrition is the wearing down by collisions of particles entrained in a moving fluid. It is effective at rounding sand grains and at giving them a distinctive frosted surface texture.

Collisions between windborne particles is a major source of dust in the size range of 2-5 microns. Most of this is produced by the removal of a weathered clay coating from the grains.

== Transport ==
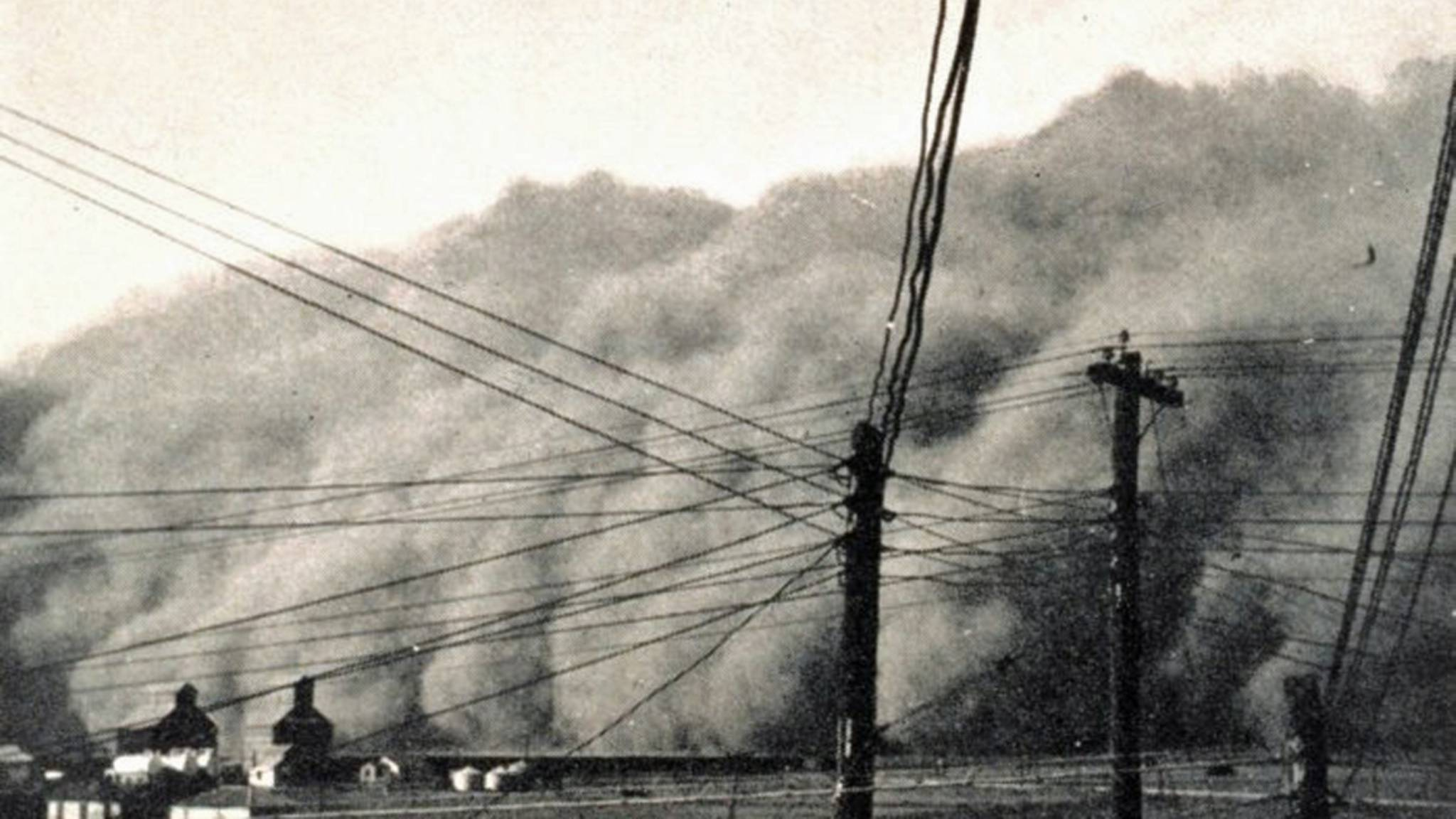
Dust storm approaching Spearman, Texas, 14 April 1935

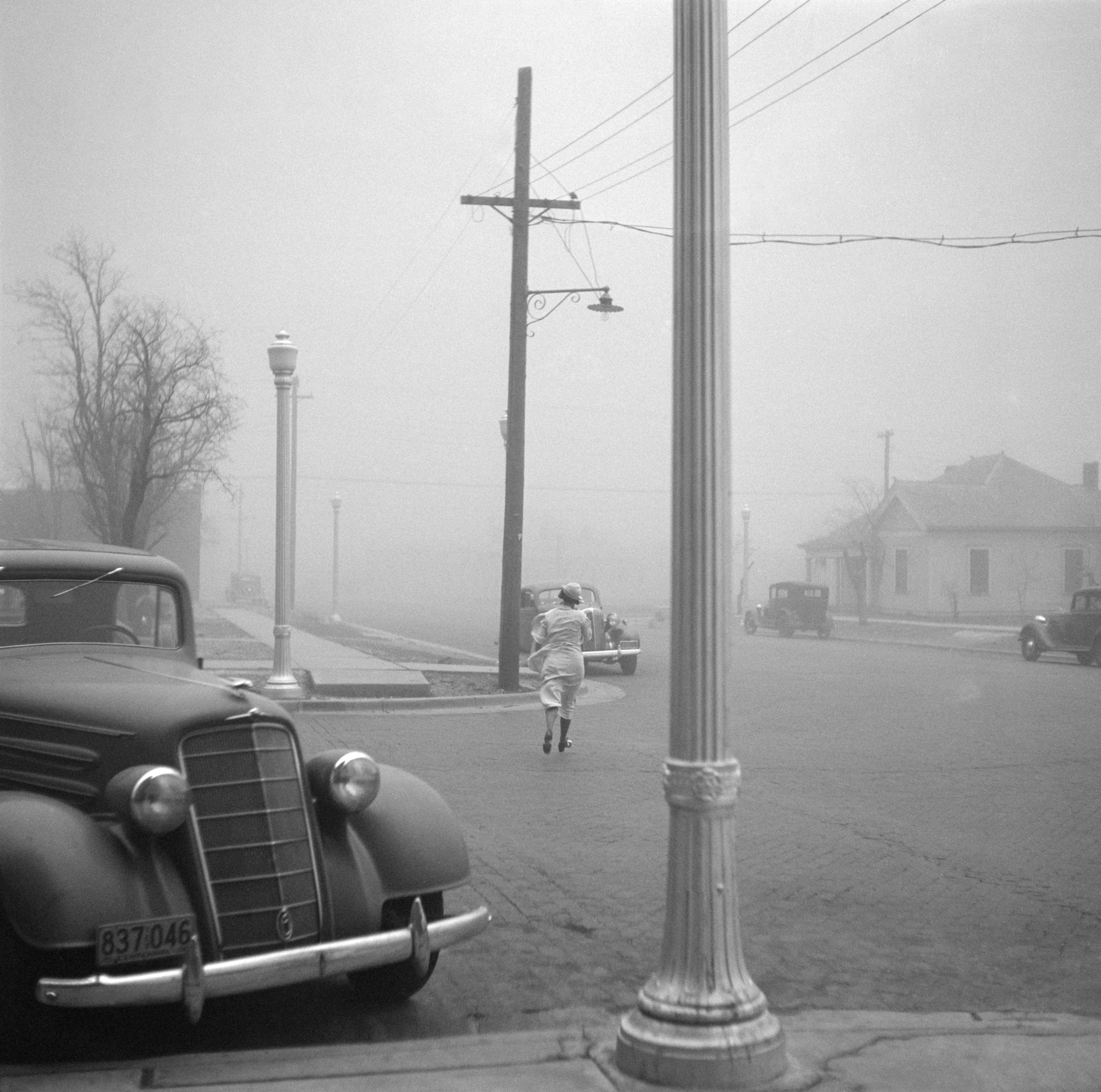
Dust storm in Amarillo, Texas. FSA photo by Arthur Rothstein (1936)

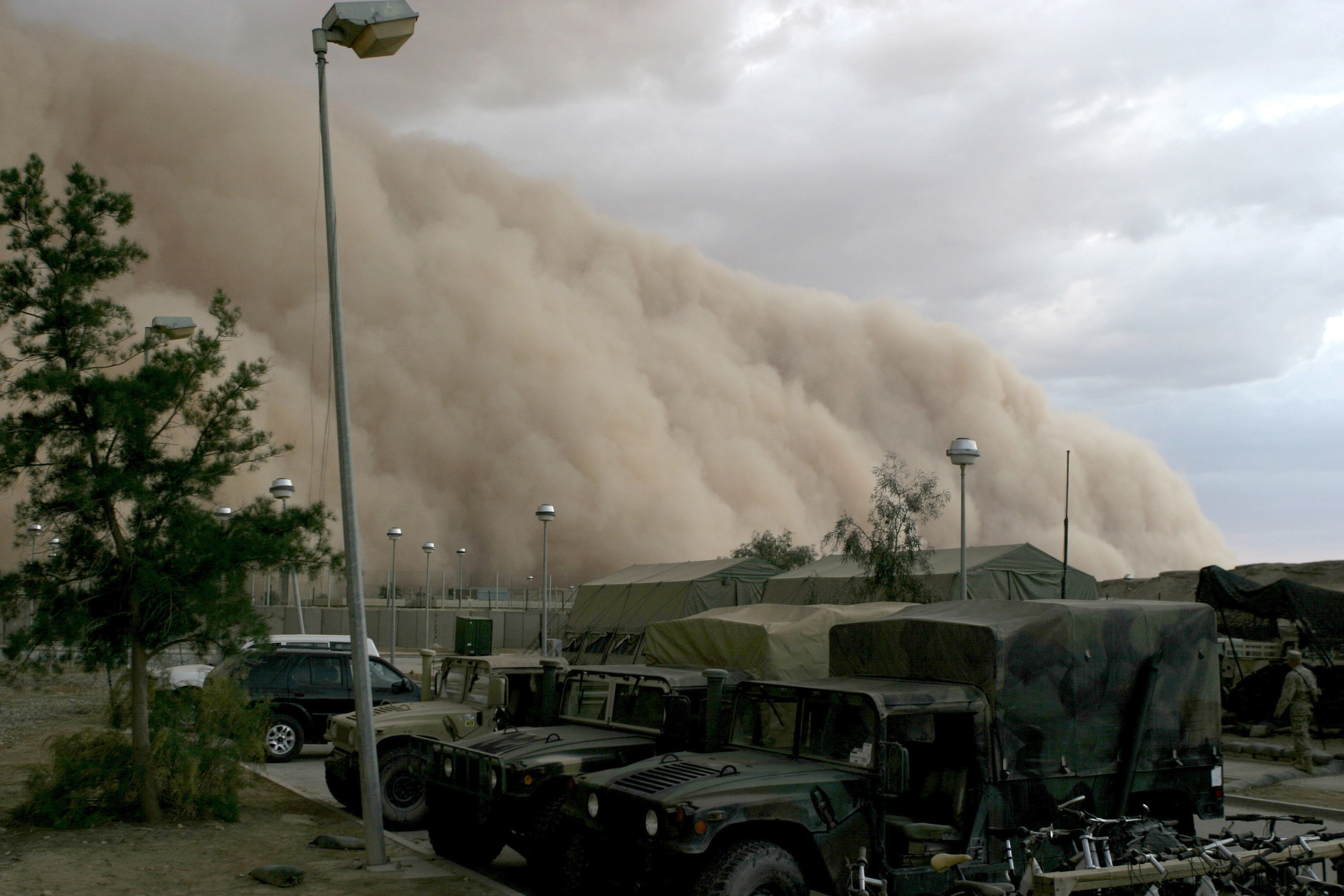
A massive sand storm cloud is about to envelop a military camp as it rolls over Al Asad, Iraq, just before nightfall on 27 April 2005.

Wind dominates the transport of sand and finer sediments in arid environments. Wind transport is also important in periglacial areas, on river flood plains, and in coastal areas. Coastal winds transport significant amounts of siliciclastic and carbonate sediments inland, while wind storms and dust storms can carry clay and silt particles great distances. Wind transports much of the sediments deposited in deep ocean basins. In ergs (desert sand seas), wind is very effective at transporting grains of sand size and smaller.

Particles are transported by winds through suspension, saltation (skipping or bouncing) and creeping (rolling or sliding) along the ground. The minimum wind velocity to initiate transport is called the fluid threshold or static threshold and is the wind velocity required to begin dislodging grains from the surface. Once transport is initiated, there is a cascade effect from grains tearing loose other grains, so that transport continues until the wind velocity drops below the dynamic threshold or impact threshold, which is usually less than the fluid threshold. In other words, there is hysteresis in the wind transport system.

Small particles may be held in the atmosphere in suspension. Turbulent air motion supports the weight of suspended particles and allows them to be transported for great distances. Wind is particularly effective at separating sediment grains under 0.05 mm in size from coarser grains as suspended particles.

Saltation is downwind movement of particles in a series of jumps or skips. Saltation is most important for grains of up to 2 mm in size. A saltating grain may hit other grains that jump up to continue the saltation. The grain may also hit larger grains (over 2 mm in size) that are too heavy to hop, but that slowly creep forward as they are pushed by saltating grains. Surface creep accounts for as much as 25 percent of grain movement in a desert.

Vegetation is effective at suppressing aeolian transport. Vegetation cover of as little as 15% is sufficient to eliminate most sand transport. The size of shore dunes is limited mostly by the amount of open space between vegetated areas.

Aeolian transport from deserts plays an important role in ecosystems globally. For example, wind transports minerals from the Sahara to the Amazon basin. Saharan dust is also responsible for forming red clay soils in southern Europe.

=== Dust storms ===
Dust storms are wind storms that have entrained enough dust to reduce visibility to less than 1 kilometer (0.6 mi). Most occur on the synoptic (regional) scale, due to strong winds along weather fronts, or locally from downbursts from thunderstorms.

Crops, people, and possibly even climates are affected by dust storms. On Earth, dust can cross entire oceans, as occurs with dust from the Sahara that reaches the Amazon Basin. Dust storms on Mars periodically engulf the entire planet. When the Mariner 9 spacecraft entered its orbit around Mars in 1971, a dust storm lasting one month covered the entire planet, thus delaying the task of photo-mapping the planet's surface.

Most of the dust carried by dust storms is in the form of silt-size particles. Deposits of this windblown silt are known as loess. The thickest known deposit of loess, up to 350 meters (1,150 ft), is on the Loess Plateau in China. This very same Asian dust is blown for thousands of miles, forming deep beds in places as far away as Hawaii. The Peoria Loess of North America is up to 40 meters (130 ft) thick in parts of western Iowa. The soils developed on loess are generally highly productive for agriculture.

Small whirlwinds, called dust devils, are common in arid lands and are thought to be related to very intense local heating of the air that results in instabilities of the air mass. Dust devils may be as much as one kilometer high. Dust devils on Mars have been observed as high as 10 kilometers (6.2 mi), though this is uncommon.

== Deposition ==
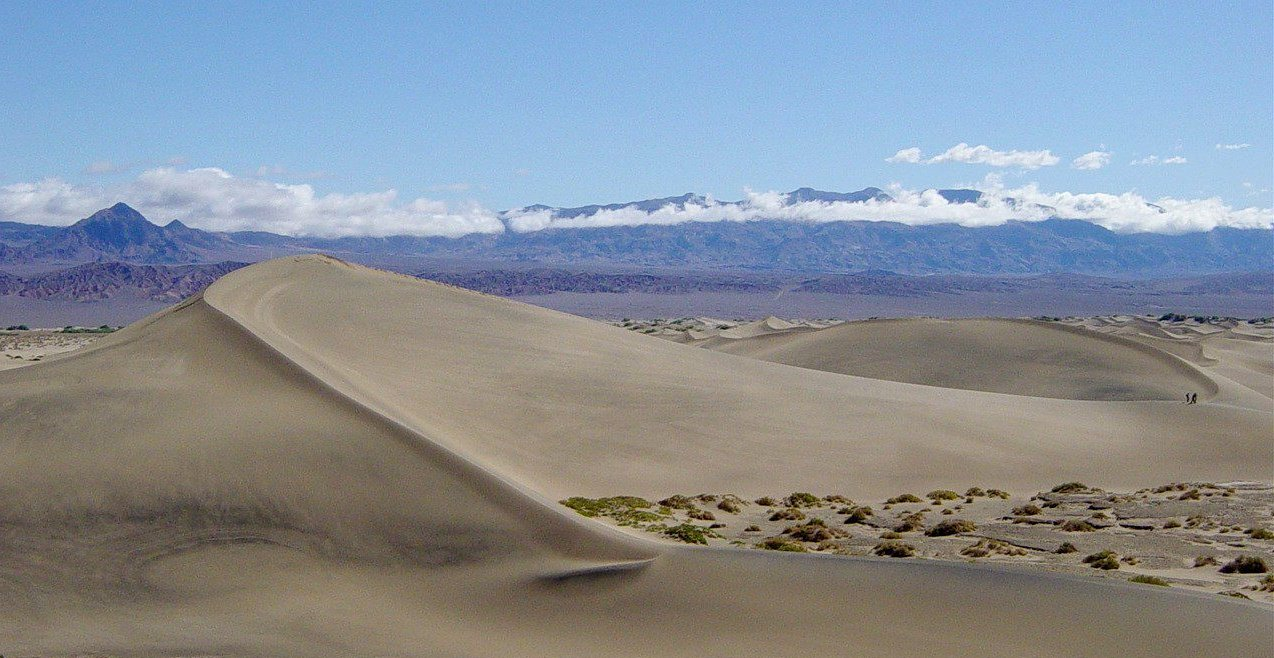
Mesquite Flat Dunes in Death Valley looking toward the Cottonwood Mountains from the north west arm of Star Dune (2003)

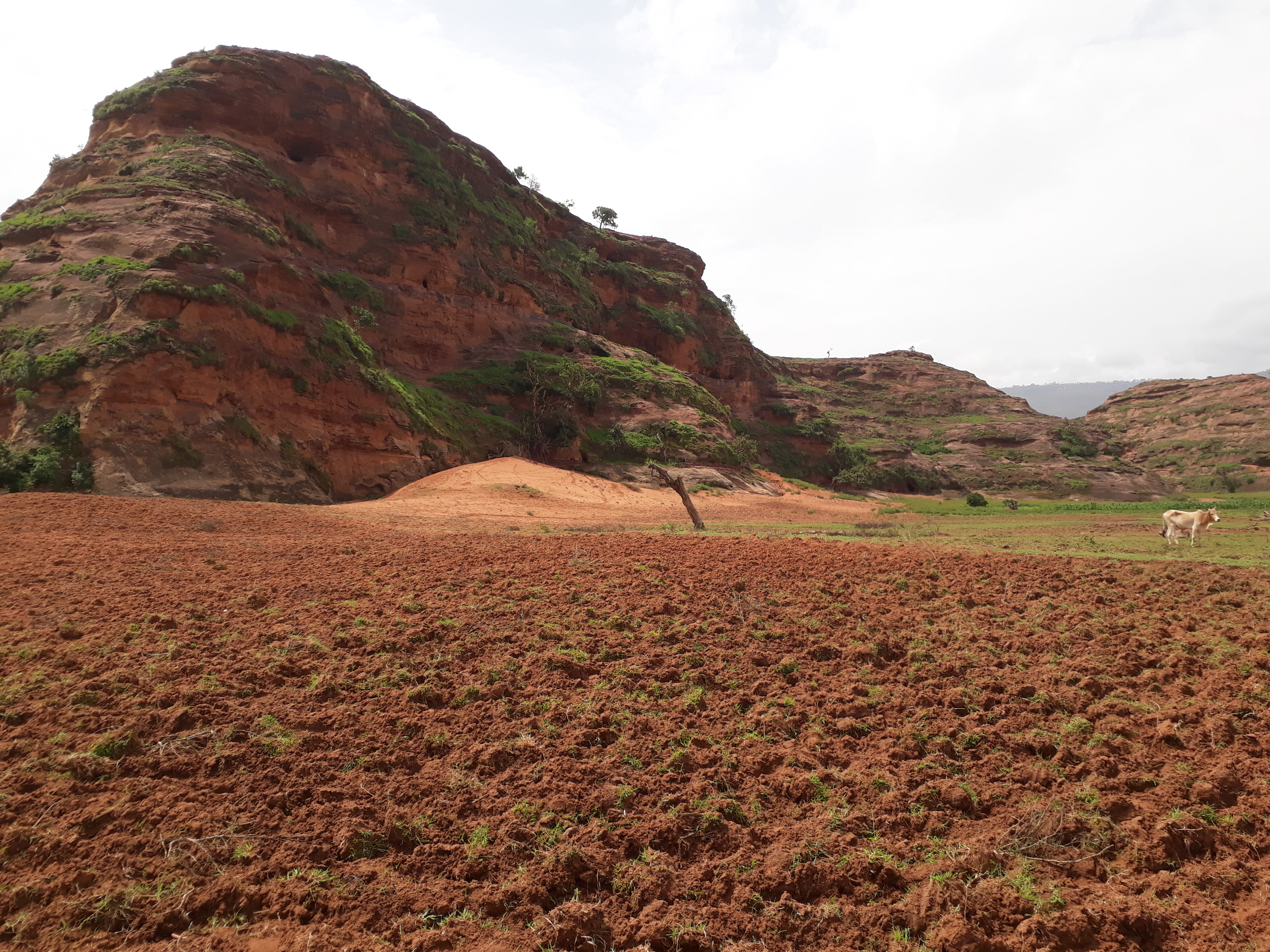
Aeolian deposition near Addeha, Kola Tembien, Ethiopia (2019)

Wind is very effective at separating sand from silt and clay. As a result, there are distinct sandy (erg) and silty (loess) aeolian deposits, with only limited interbedding between the two. Loess deposits are found further from the original source of sediments than ergs. An example of this is the Sand Hills of Nebraska, US. Here vegetation-stabilized sand dunes are found to the west and loess deposits to the east, further from the original sediment source in the Ogallala Formation at the feet of the Rocky Mountains.

Some of the most significant experimental measurements on aeolian landforms were performed by Ralph Alger Bagnold, a British army engineer who worked in Egypt prior to World War II. Bagnold investigated the physics of particles moving through the atmosphere and deposited by wind. He recognized two basic dune types, the crescentic dune, which he called "barchan", and the linear dune, which he called longitudinal or "seif" (Arabic for "sword"). Bagnold developed a classification scheme that included small-scale ripples and sand sheets as well as various types of dunes.

Bagnold's classification is most applicable in areas devoid of vegetation. In 1941, John Tilton Hack added parabolic dunes, which are strongly influenced by vegetation, to the list of dune types. The discovery of dunes on Mars reinvigorated aeolian process research, which increasingly makes use of computer simulation.

Wind-deposited materials hold clues to past as well as to present wind directions and intensities. These features help us understand the present climate and the forces that molded it. For example, vast inactive ergs in much of the modern world attest to late Pleistocene trade wind belts being much expanded during the Last Glacial Maximum. Ice cores show a tenfold increase in non-volcanic dust during glacial maxima. The highest dust peak in the Vostok ice cores dates to 20 to 21 thousand years ago. The abundant dust is attributed to a vigorous low-latitude wind system plus more exposed continental shelf due to low sea levels.

Wind-deposited sand bodies occur as ripples and other small-scale features, sand sheets, and dunes.

=== Ripples and other small-scale features ===
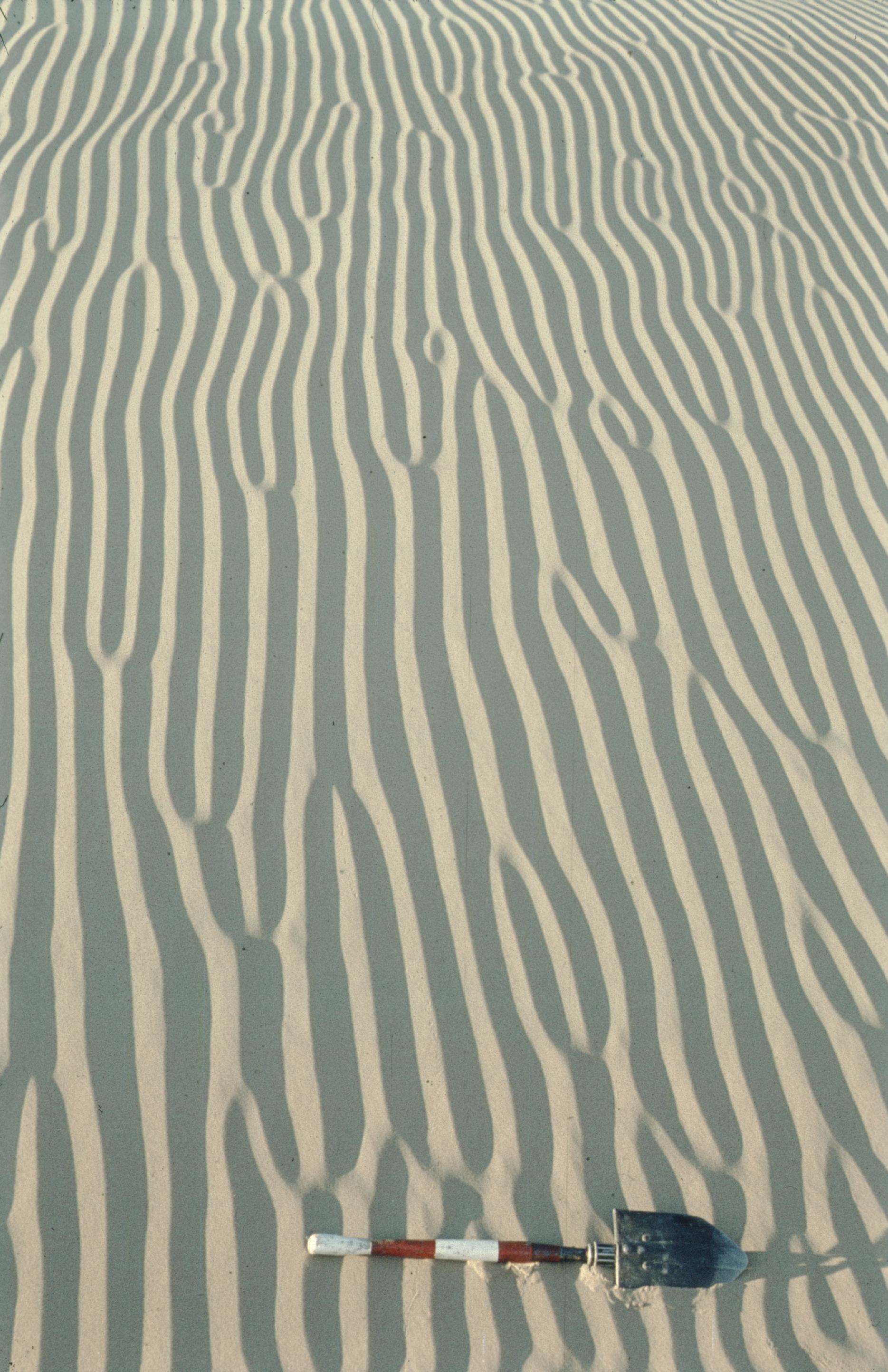
Wind ripples on crescent-shaped sand dunes (barchans) in southwest Afghanistan (Sistan)

Wind blowing on a sand surface ripples the surface into crests and troughs whose long axes are perpendicular to the wind direction. The average length of jumps during saltation corresponds to the wavelength, or distance between adjacent crests, of the ripples. In ripples, the coarsest materials collect at the crests causing inverse grading. This distinguishes small ripples from dunes, where the coarsest materials are generally in the troughs. This is also a distinguishing feature between water laid ripples and aeolian ripples.

A sand shadow is an accumulation of sand on the downwind side of an obstruction, such as a boulder or an isolated patch of vegetation. Here the sand builds up to the angle of repose (the maximum stable slope angle), about 34 degrees, then begins sliding down the slip face of the patch. A sandfall is a sand shadow of a cliff or escarpment.

Closely related to sand shadows are sand drifts. These form downwind of a gap between obstructions, due to the funneling effect of the obstructions on the wind.

=== Sand sheets ===
Sand sheets are flat or gently undulating sandy deposits with only small surface ripples. An example is the Selima Sand Sheet in the eastern Sahara Desert, which occupies 60,000 square kilometers (23,000 sq mi) in southern Egypt and northern Sudan. This consists of a few feet of sand resting on bedrock. Sand sheets are often remarkably flat and are sometimes described as desert peneplains.

Sand sheets are common in desert environments, particularly on the margins of dune fields, although they also occur within ergs. Conditions that favor the formation of sand sheets, instead of dunes, may include surface cementation, a high water table, the effects of vegetation, periodic flooding, or sediments rich in grains too coarse for effective saltation.

=== Dunes ===
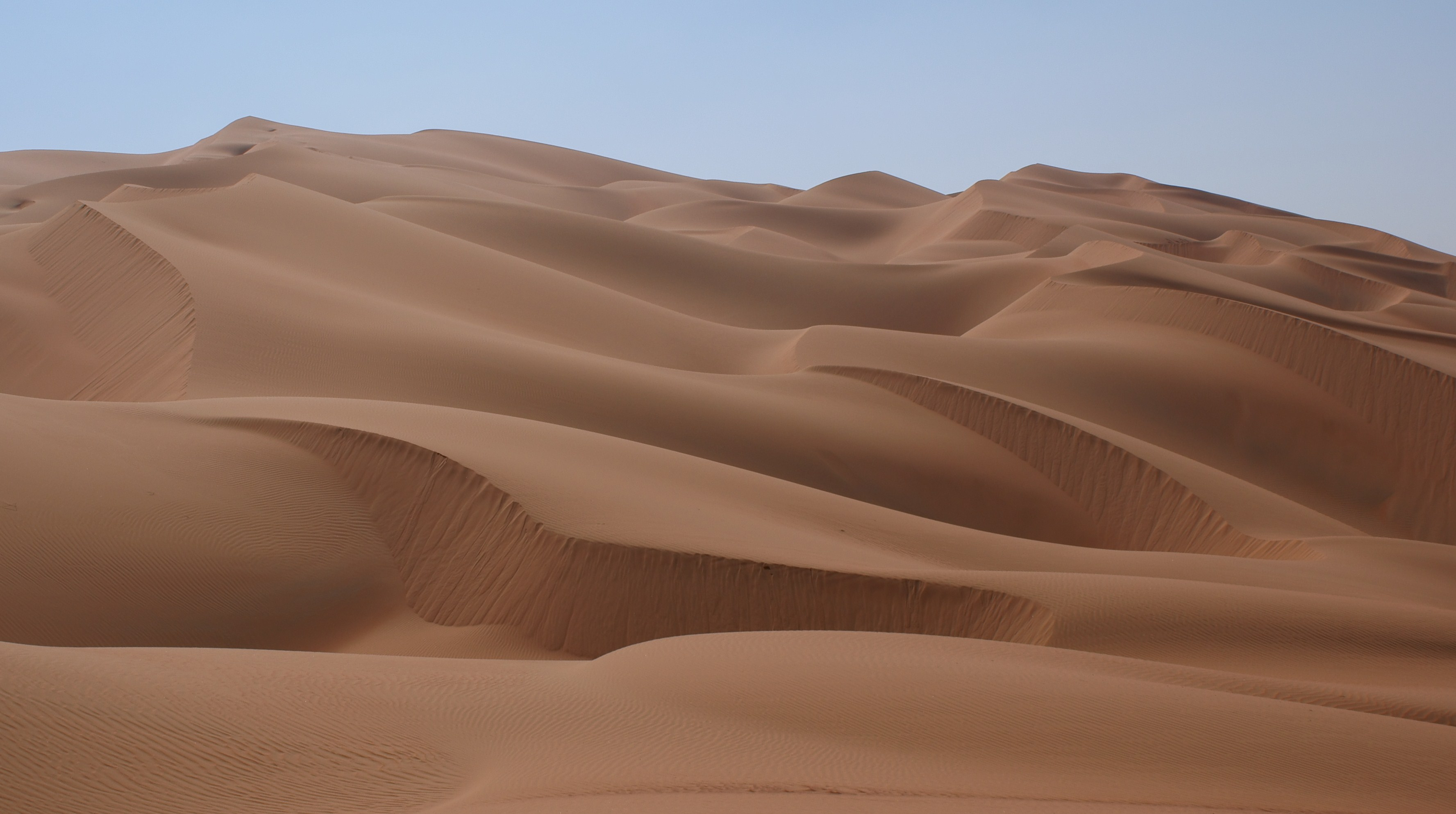
Sand dunes of the Empty Quarter to the east of Liwa Oasis, United Arab Emirates

A dune is an accumulations of sediment blown by the wind into a mound or ridge. They differ from sand shadows or sand drifts in that they are independent of any topographic obstacle. Dunes have gentle upwind slopes on the windward side. The downwind portion of the dune, the lee slope, is commonly a steep avalanche slope referred to as a slipface. Dunes may have more than one slipface. The minimum height of a slipface is about 30 centimeters.

Wind-blown sand moves up the gentle upwind side of the dune by saltation or creep. Sand accumulates at the brink, the top of the slipface. When the buildup of sand at the brink exceeds the angle of repose, a small avalanche of grains slides down the slipface. Grain by grain, the dune moves downwind.

Dunes take three general forms. Linear dunes, also called longitudinal dunes or seifs, are aligned in the direction of the prevailing winds. Transverse dunes, which include crescent dunes (barchans), are aligned perpendicular to the prevailing winds. More complex dunes, such as star dunes, form where the directions of the winds are highly variable. Additional dune types arise from various kinds of topographic forcing, such as from isolated hills or escarpments.

==== Transverse dunes ====
Transverse dunes occur in areas dominated by a single direction of the prevailing wind. In areas where sand is not abundant, transverse dunes take the form of barchans or crescent dunes. These are not common, but they are highly recognizable, with a distinctive crescent shape with the tips of the crescent directed downwind. The dunes are widely separated by areas of bedrock or reg. Barchans migrate up to 30 meters (98 ft) per year, with the taller dunes migrating faster. Barchans first form when some minor topographic feature creates a sand patch. This grows into a sand mound, and the converging streamlines of the air flow around the mound build it into the distinctive crescent shape. Growth is ultimately limited by the carrying capacity of the wind, which as the wind becomes saturated with sediments, builds up the slip face of the dune. Because barchans develop in areas of limited sand availability, they are poorly preserved in the geologic record.

Where sand is more abundant, transverse dunes take the form of aklé dunes, such as those of the western Sahara. These form a network of sinuous ridges perpendicular to the wind direction. Aklé dunes are preserved in the geologic record as sandstone with large sets of cross-bedding and many reactivation surfaces.

Draas are very large composite transverse dunes. They can be up to 4,000 meters (13,000 ft) across and 400 meters (1,300 ft) high and extend lengthwise for hundreds of kilometers. In form, they resemble a large aklé or barchanoid dune. They form over a prolonged period of time in areas of abundant sand and show a complex internal structure. Careful 3-D mapping is required to determine the morphology of a draa preserved in the geologic record.

==== Linear dunes ====
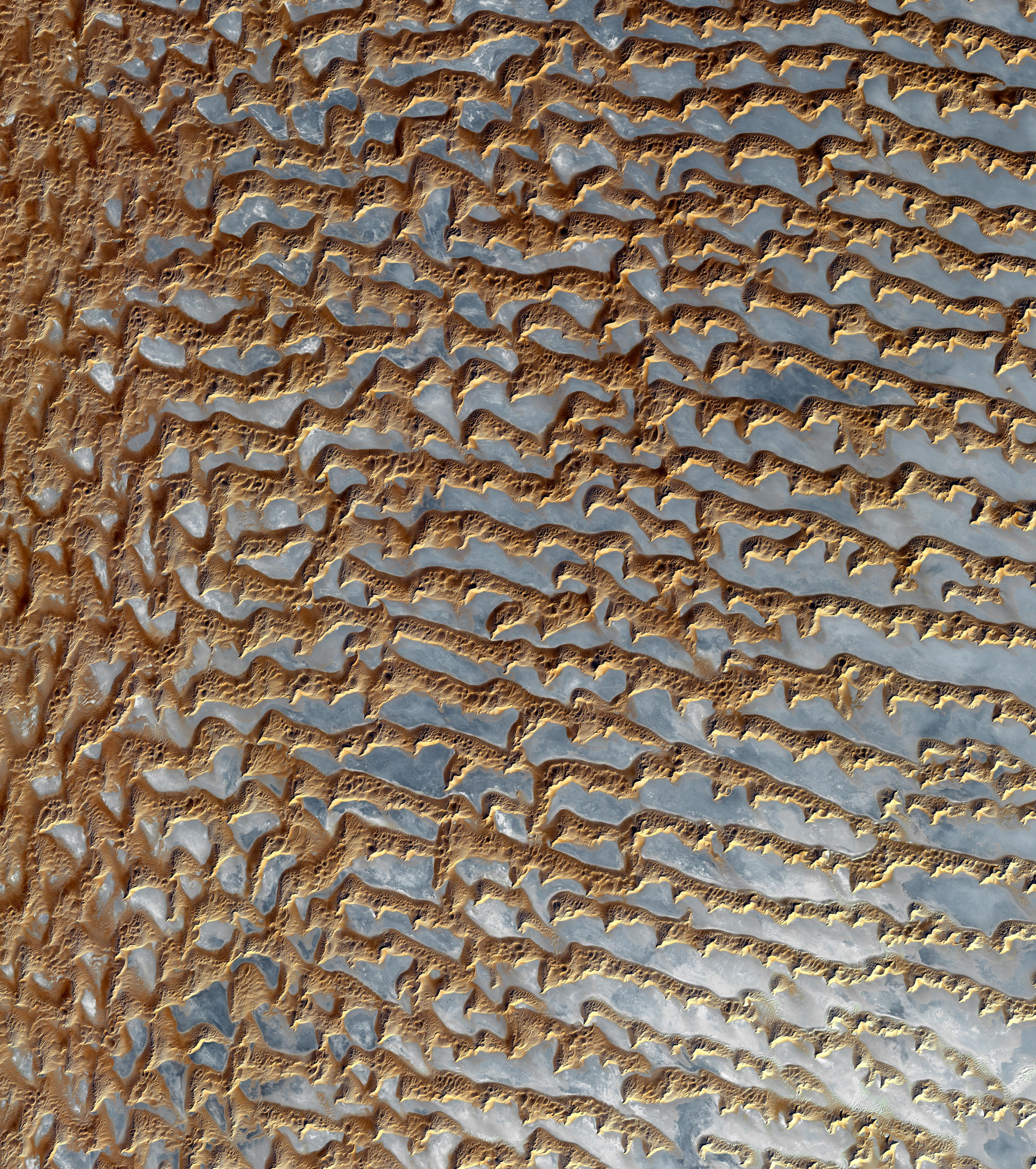
Rub' al Khali (Arabian Empty Quarter) sand dunes imaged by Terra (EOS AM-1). Most of these dunes are seif dunes. Their origin from barchans is suggested by the stubby remnant "hooks" seen on many of the dunes. Wind would be from left to right.

Linear dunes can be traced up to tens of kilometers, with heights sometimes in excess of 70 meters (230 ft). They are typically several hundred meters across and are spaced 1 to 2 kilometers (0.62 to 1.24 mi) apart. They sometimes coalesce at a Y-junction with the fork directed upwind. They have a sharp sinuous or en echelon crest. They are thought to form from a bimodal seasonal wind pattern, with a weak wind season characterized by wind directed an at acute angle to the prevailing winds of the strong wind season. The strong wind season produces a barchan form and the weak wind season stretches this into the linear form. Another possibility is that these dunes result from secondary flow, though the precise mechanism remains uncertain.

==== Complex dunes ====
Complex dunes (star dunes or rhourd dunes) are characterized by having more than two slip faces. They are typically 500 to 1,000 meters (1,600 to 3,300 ft) across and 50 to 300 meters (160 to 980 ft) high. They consist of a central peak with radiating crests and are thought to form where strong winds can come from any direction. Those in Gran Desierto de Altar of Mexico are thought to have formed from precursor linear dunes due to a change in the wind pattern about 3000 years ago. Complex dunes show little lateral growth but strong vertical growth and are important sand sinks.

==== Other dune types ====
Vegetated parabolic dunes are crescent-shaped, but the ends of the crescent point upwind, not downwind. They form from the interaction of vegetation patches with active sand sources, such as blowouts. The vegetation stabilizes the arms of the dune, and an elongated lake sometimes forms between the arms of the dune.

Clay dunes are uncommon but have been found in Africa, Australia, and along the Gulf Coast of North America. These form on mud flats on the margins of saline bodies of water subject to strong prevailing winds during a dry season. Clay particles are bound into sand-sized pellets by salts and are then deposited in the dunes, where the return of the cool season allows the pellets to absorb moisture and become bound to the dune surface.

== Aeolian desert systems ==
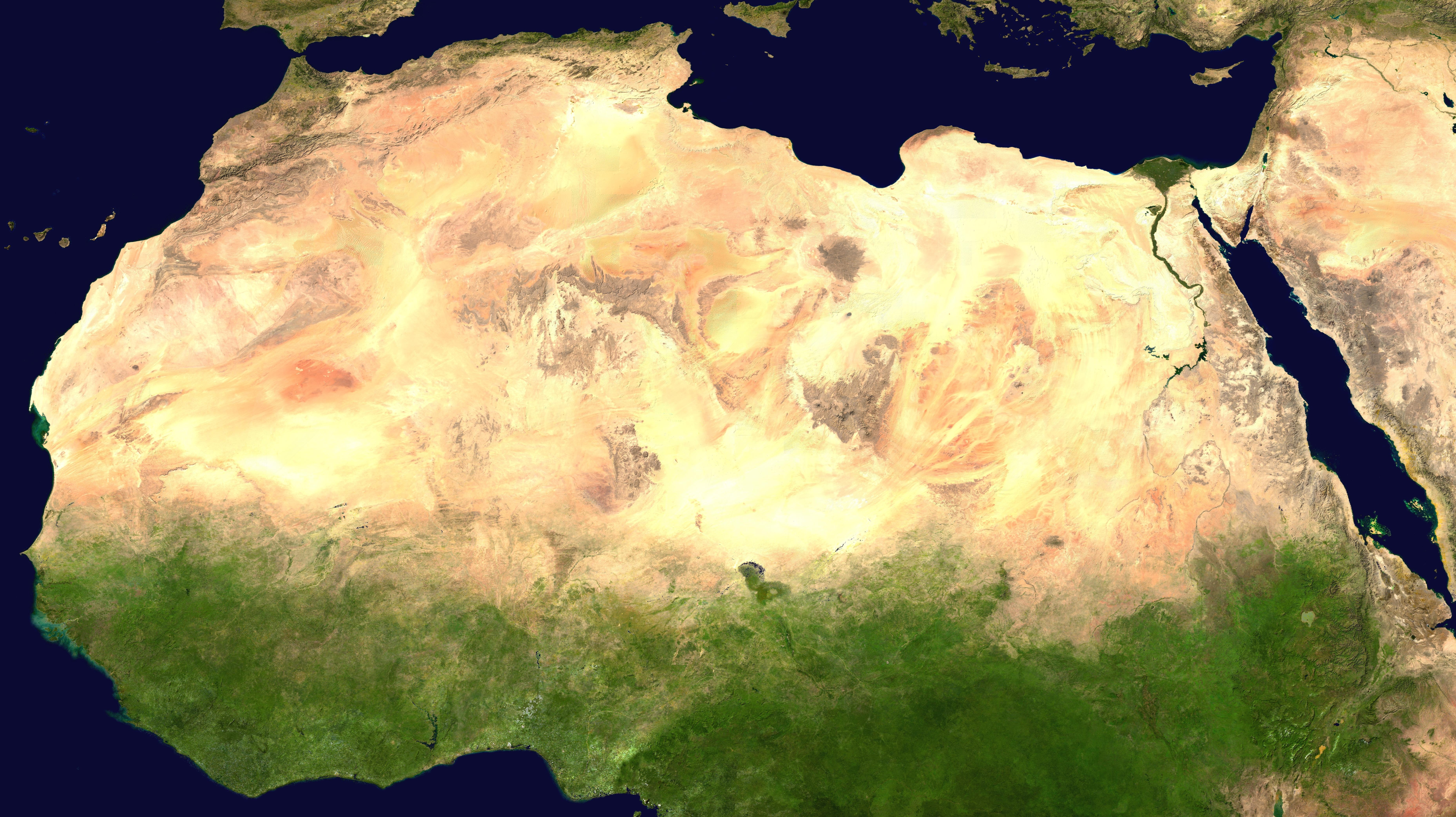
Satellite image of Sahara

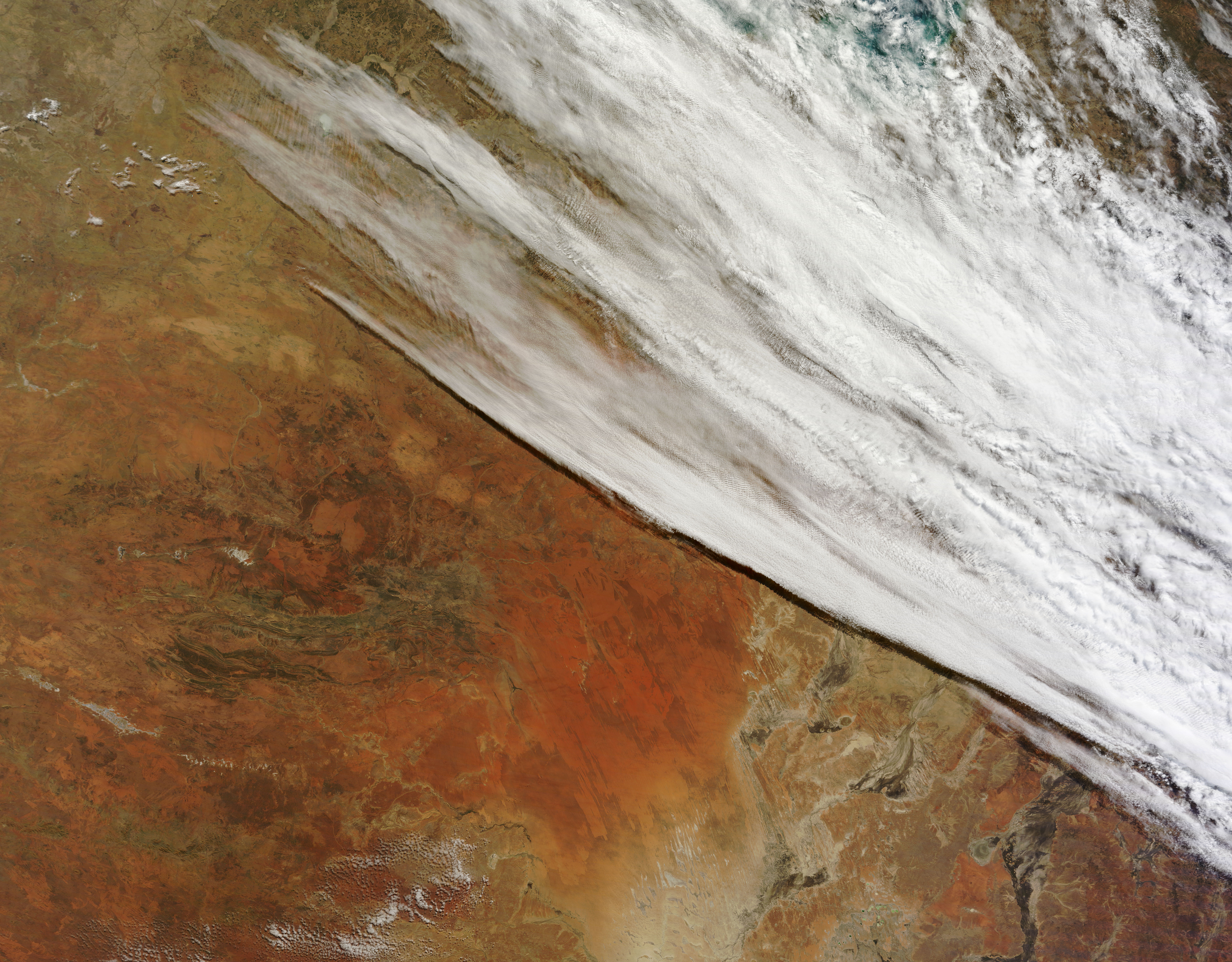
Unsettled weather system moving across the Australian desert

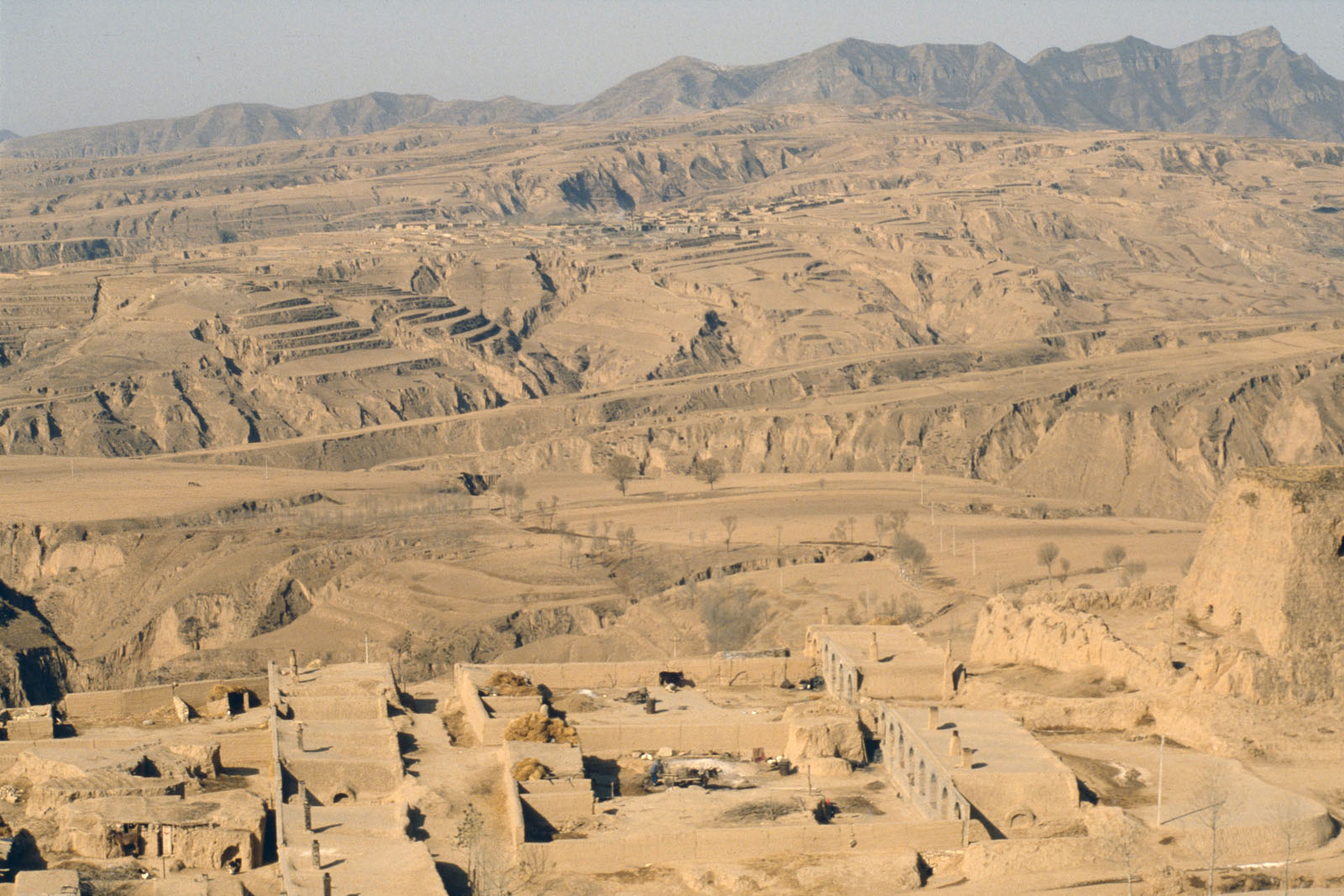
Loess Plateau near Hunyuan, Shanxi

Deserts cover 20 to 25 percent of the modern land surface of the earth, mostly between the latitudes of 10 to 30 degrees north or south. Here the descending part of the tropical atmospheric circulation (the Hadley cell) produces high atmospheric pressure and suppresses precipitation. Large areas of this desert is floored with windblown sand. Such areas are called ergs when they exceed about 125 square kilometers (48 sq mi) in area or dune fields when smaller. Ergs and dune fields make up about 20% of modern deserts or about 6% of the Earth's total land surface.

The sandy areas of today's world are somewhat anomalous. Deserts, in both the present day and in the geological record, are usually dominated by alluvial fans rather than dune fields. The present relative abundance of sandy areas may reflect reworking of Tertiary sediments following the Last Glacial Maximum. Most modern deserts have experienced extreme Quaternary climate change, and the sediments that are now being churned by wind systems were generated in upland areas during previous pluvial (moist) periods and transported to depositional basins by stream flow. The sediments, already sorted during their initial fluvial transport, were further sorted by wind, which also sculpted the sediments into eolian landforms.

The state of an aeolian system depends mainly on three things: The amount of sediment supply, the availability of sediments, and the transport capacity of the winds. The sediment supply is largely produced in pluvial periods (periods of greater rainfall) and accumulates by runoff as fan deltas or terminal fans in sedimentary basins. Another important source of sediments is the reworking of carbonate sediments on continental shelves exposed during times of lower sea level. Sediment availability depends on the coarseness of the local sediment supply, the degree of exposure of sediment grains, the amount of soil moisture, and the extent of vegetation coverage. The potential transport rate of wind is usually more than the actual transport, because the sediment supply is usually insufficient to saturate the wind. In other words, most aeolian systems are transport-undersaturated (or sediment-undersaturated).

Aeolian desert systems can be divided into wet, dry, or stabilized systems. Dry systems have the water table well below the surface, where it has no stabilizing effect on sediments. Dune shapes determine whether sediment is deposited, simply moves across surface (a bypass system), or erosion takes place. Wet systems are characterized by a water table near the depositional surface, which exerts a strong control on deposition, bypass, or erosion. Stabilized systems have significant vegetation, surface cement, or mud drapes which dominate the evolution of the system. The Sahara shows the full range of all three types.

The movement of sediments in aeolian systems can be represented by sand-flow maps. These are based on meteorological observations, bedform orientations, and trends of yardangs. They are analogous to drainage maps, but are not as closely tied to topography, since wind can blow sand significant distances uphill.

The Sahara of North Africa is the largest hot desert in the world. Flowlines can be traced from erg to erg, demonstrating very long transport downwind. Satellite observations show yardangs aligned with the sandflow lines. All flowlines arise in the desert itself, and show indications of clockwise circulation roughly like high pressure cells. The greatest deflation occurs in dried lake beds where trade winds form a low-level jet between the Tibesti Mountains and the Ennedi Plateau. The flowlines eventually reach the, sea creating great plume of Saharan dust extending thousands of kilometers into the Atlantic Ocean. This creates a steady rain of silt into the ocean. It is estimated that 260 million tons of sediments are transported through this system each year, but the amount was much greater during the Last Glacial Maximum, based on deep-sea cores. Mineral dust of 0.1–1 microns in size is a good shortwave radiation scatterer and has a cooling effect on climate.

Another example of an aeolian system is the arid interior of Australia. With few topographic barriers to sand movement, an anticlockwise wind system is traced by systems of longitudinal dunes.

The Namib and Oman ergs are fed by coastal sediments. The Namib receives its sediments from the south through narrow deflation corridors from coast that cross more than 100 kilometers (62 mi) of bedrock to the erg. The Oman was created by deflation of marine shelf carbonates during the last Pleistocene lowstand of the sea.

The Loess Plateau of China has been a long-term sink for sediments during the Quaternary ice age. It provides a record of glaciation, in the form of glacial loess layers separated by paleosols (fossil soils). The loess layers were desposited by a strong northwest winter monsoon, while the paleosols record the influence of a moist southeast monsoon.

The African savannah is mostly ergs deposited during the Last Glacial Maximum that are now stabilized by vegetation.

=== Examples ===
Major global aeolian systems thought to be linked with weather and climate variation:

- An average of 132 million tons of dust from the Sahara (primarily the Sahel and Bodélé Depression) across the Atlantic each year.
- Harmattan winter dust storms in West Africa also occur blowing dust to the ocean.
- Asian dust originates in the Gobi Desert and reaches Korea, Japan, Taiwan (at times) and even the western US.
- The 2018 Indian dust storms transported dust from the Thar Desert towards Delhi, Uttar Pradesh, and the Indo-Gangetic Plain.
- Shamal June–July winds blowing dust in primarily north to south in Saudi Arabia, Iran, Iraq, UAE, and parts of Pakistan.
- Haboob dust storms in Sudan, Australia, Arizona associated with monsoon.
- Khamsin dust from Libya, Egypt and Levant in Spring associated with extratropical cyclones.
- Dust Bowl event in US, carried sand eastward. 5500 tons were deposited in Chicago area.
- Sirocco sandy winds from Africa/Sahara blowing north into South Europe.
- Kalahari Desert blowing sand/dust east across southern Africa toward Indian Ocean.
- Mars in the arid conditions, many aeolian processes have been discovered.

=== In the geologic record ===
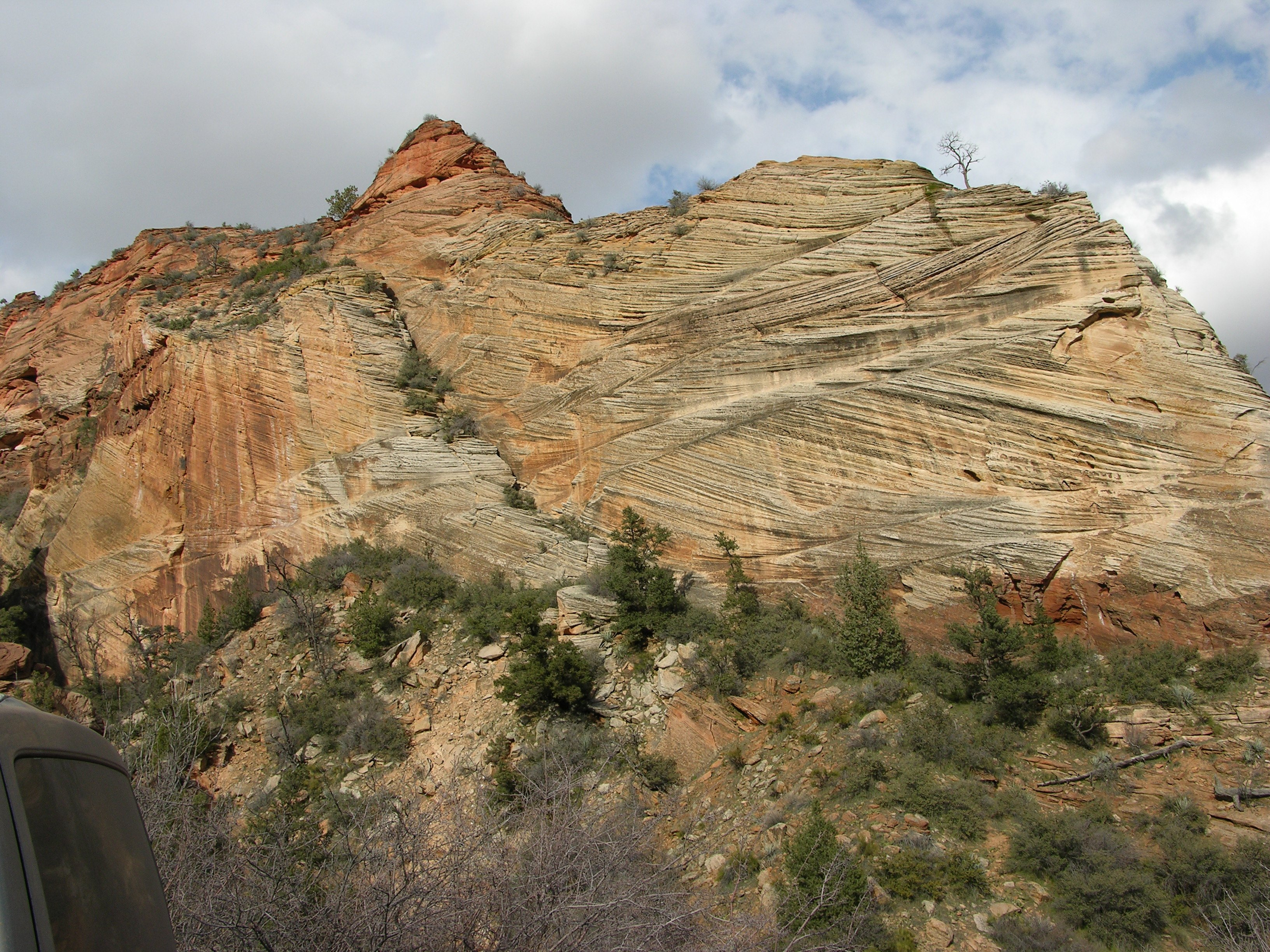
Cross-bedding of sandstone near Mt. Carmel road, Zion Canyon

Aeolian processes can be discerned at work in the geologic record as long ago as the Precambrian. Aeolian formations are prominent in the Paleozoic and Mesozoic of the western US. Other examples include the Permian Rotliegendes of northwestern Europe; the Jurassic–Cretaceous Botucatu Formation of the Parana Basin of Brazil; the Permian Lower Bunter Sandstone of Britain; the Permian-Triassic Corrie Sandstone and Hopeman Sandstone of Scotland; and the Proterozoic sandstones of India and northwest Africa.

Perhaps the best examples of aeolian processes in the geologic record are the Jurassic ergs of the western US. These include the Wingate Sandstone, the Navajo Sandstone, and the Page Sandstone. Individual formations are separated by regional unconformities indicate erg stabilization. The ergs interfingered with adjacent river systems, as with the Wingate Sandstone interfingering with the Moenave Formation and the Navajo Sandstone with the Kayenta Formation.

The Navajo and Nugget Sandstones were part of the largest erg deposit in the geologic record. These formations are up to 700 meters (2,300 ft) thick and are exposed over 265,000 square kilometers (102,000 sq mi). Their original extent was likely 2.5 times the present outcrop area. Though once thought to possibly be marine in origin, they are now all but universally regarded as aeolian deposits. They are made up mostly of fine- to medium-sized quartz grains that are well-rounded and frosted, both indications of aeolian transport. The Navajo contains huge tabular crossbed sets with sweeping foresets. Individual crossbed sets dip at an angle of more than 20 degrees and are from 5 to 35 meters (16 to 115 ft) thick. The formation contains freshwater invertebrate fossils and vertebrate tracks. Slump structures (contorted bedding) are present that resemble those in modern wetted dunes. Successive migrating dunes deposited a vertical stacking of eolian beds between interdune bounding surfaces and regional supersurfaces.

The Permian Rotliegend Group of the North Sea and north Europe contains sediments from adjacent uplands. Erg sand bodies within the group are up to 500 meters (1,600 ft) thick. Study of the crossbedding shows that sediments were deposited by a clockwise atmospheric cell. Drilling core show dry and wet interdune surfaces and regional supersurfaces, and provide evidence of five or more cycles of erg expansion and contraction. A global rise in sea level finally drowned the erg and deposited the beds of the Weissliegend.

The Cedar Mesa Sandstone in Utah was contemporary with the Rogliegend. This formation records at least 12 erg sequences bounded by regional deflation supersurfaces. Aeolian landforms preserved in the formation range from damp sandsheet and lake paleosol (fossil soil) beds to thin, chaotically arranged dune sets to equilibrium erg construction, with dunes 300 to 400 meters (980 to 1,310 ft) wide migrating over still larger draas. The draas survived individual climate cycles, and their interdunes were sites of barchan nucleation during arid portions of the climate cycles.

== See also ==
- Aeolian sound – Tones generated by wind passing through or over objects
- Bagnold formula – Formula relating wind speed and mass transport
- Bibliography of Aeolian Research – 2015 bibliography on aeolian processes
- Dreikanter – Type of rock
- Médanos (geology)
- Niveo-aeolian deposition – Deposition of sediments onto snow or ice
- Sandhill – Type of ecological community or xeric wildfire-maintained ecosystem
- The Physics of Blown Sand and Desert Dunes – Book by Ralph Alger Bagnold
- Wind Erosion on European Light Soils – EU Environment and Climate Programme research project
