= Dreikanter =

Type of rock

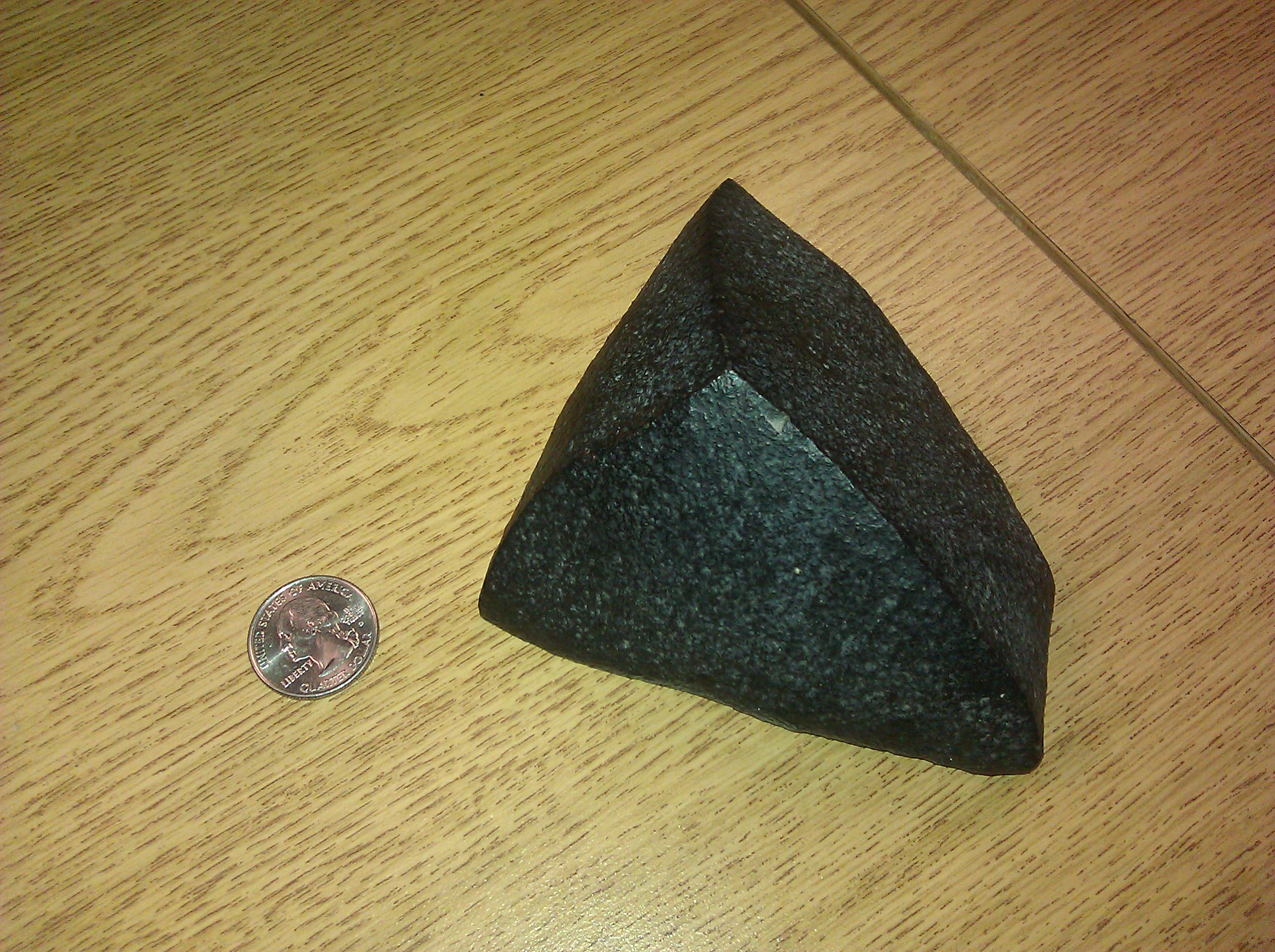
A dreikanter from the Wind River Basin, Wyoming, USA. Property of Western Washington University. Photo by AJ Wakefield, 2012.

A dreikanter is a type of ventifact that typically forms in desert or periglacial environments due to the abrasive action of blowing sand.

Dreikanters exhibit a characteristic pyramidal shape with three wind-abraded facets. The word Dreikanter is German for "three-edged." Similarly, a zweikanter ("two-edged") has two wind facets, an einkanter ("one-edged"), has only one wind facet.

Most places on Earth have several weathering processes acting at the same time, so finding good examples of dreikanters is often difficult. Antarctica is a good location for finding such ventifacts since wind is usually the only active weathering agent. Many specimens in the Northeastern United States were formed during the Pleistocene era when the absence of vegetation made for little cover from wind-blown sediment. Dreikanters have also been observed on Mars in rover footage from the planet.

== Common features ==
Some common features of dreikanters include fluting, high polish, sharp ridges, pits, grooves, and helical forms.

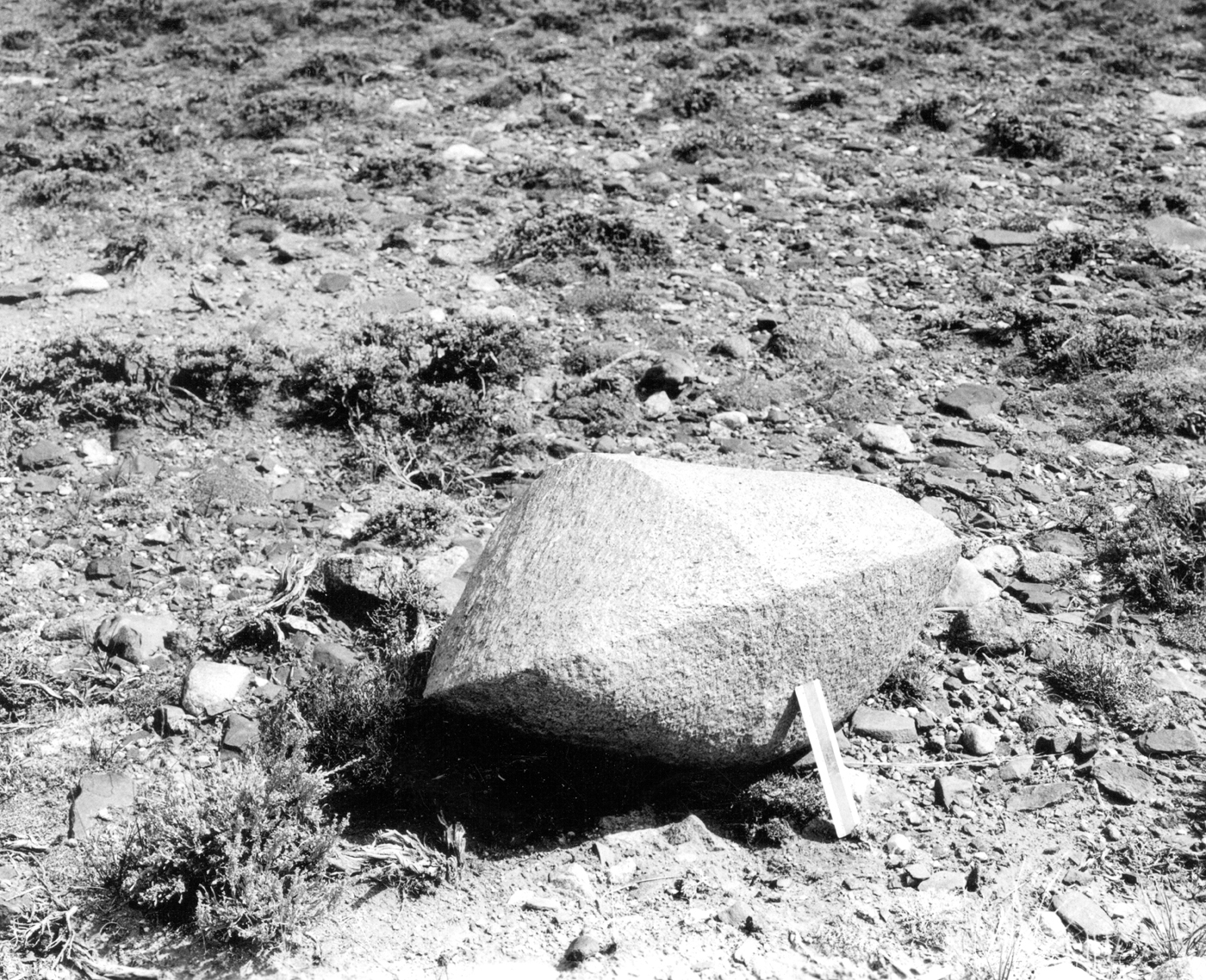
Unusually large dreikanter of granite, Sweetwater County, Wyoming. This dreikanter measures 71 cm by 46 cm deep and 37 cm wide. Photo by Bradley, W.H., USGS (1930).

== Formation ==
In areas where there is a prevailing wind, sand and debris cause a rock face to become flattened and polished. This changes the mass distribution of the rock, and may cause it to turn another surface toward the wind. If this process continues undisturbed, the resulting rock will have three distinct flattened and polished faces. Dreikanters generally form in dry, arid environments from hard rocks.

== See also ==
- Aeolian processes – Processes due to wind activity
- Blowout (geomorphology) – Depressions in a sand dune ecosystem caused by the removal of sediments by wind
- Dune – Hill of loose sand built by aeolian processes or the flow of water
- Saltation (geology) – Particle transport by fluids
- Yardang – Streamlined aeolian landform
