= Red Canyon (Fremont County, Wyoming) =

Canyon in Wyoming, U.S.

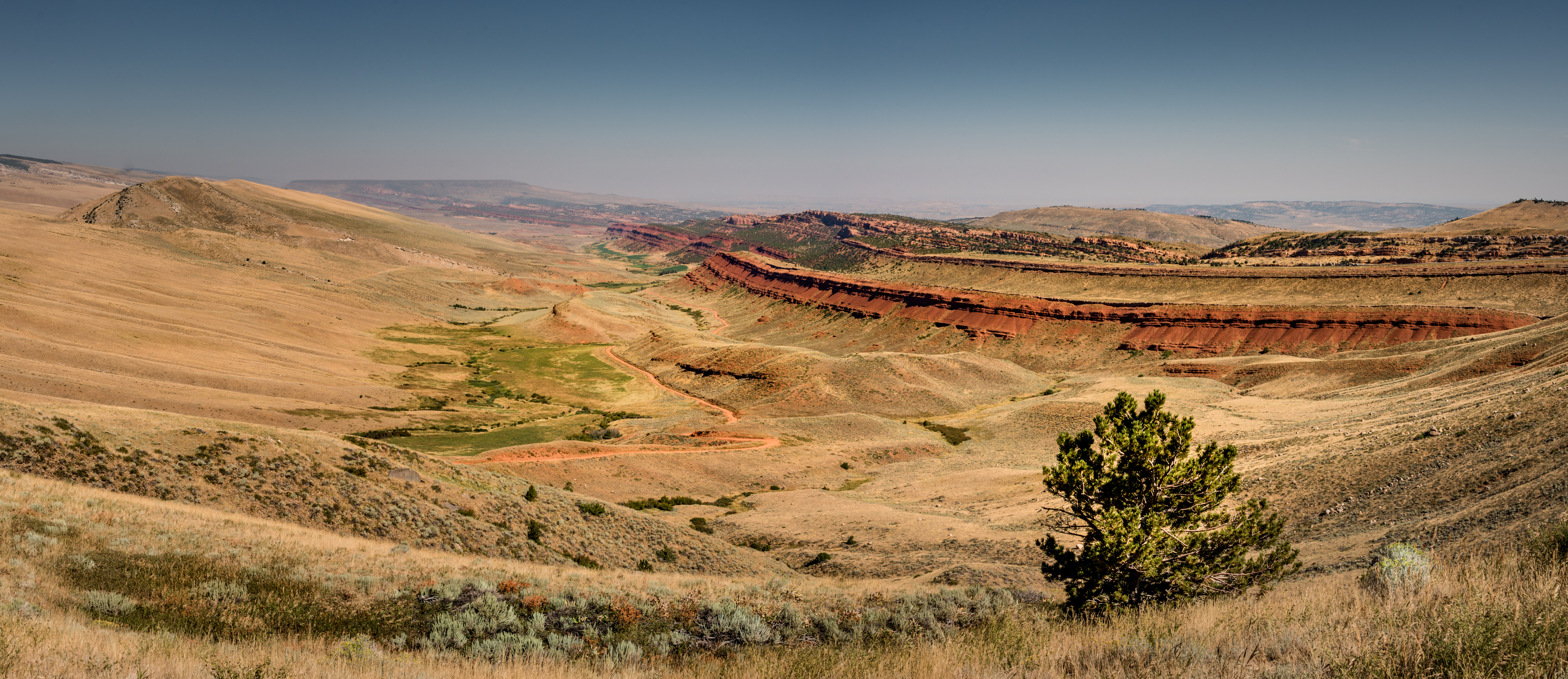
- Red Canyon, August 2017

- Location within Wyoming
- Location: Fremont County, Wyoming
- Coordinates: 42°40′20″N 108°39′29″W
- Designated: 1980

Red Canyon is a canyon located in Fremont County, Wyoming in the United States of America. The uplift of the nearby Wind River Range 60 million years ago exposed sedimentary rocks that were eroded by streams. The canyon exposes a number of geologic formations including the Phosphoria Formation from the Permian Period and the Chugwater Formation from the Triassic Period. Oxidized iron deposits in the rocks give the canyon its name. Red Canyon Creek drains the canyon and feeds into the Little Popo Agie River at the northern end. The streams provide habitat for wildlife in an otherwise arid region.

There is evidence of over 10,000 years of human presence in the canyon, including the Shoshone and Washakie tribes which used it as a transportation corridor between South Pass and the Wind River Basin. White settlers arrived during the 1870s and established farms on the floor of the canyon which provided fresh fruit and grains for nearby miners at South Pass City and Atlantic City.

Today, much of the canyon floor is owned by the Nature Conservancy which maintains the land as a working ranch. The canyon is listed as a National Natural Landmark.

== See also ==
- List of National Natural Landmarks in Wyoming
