= List of National Natural Landmarks in Wyoming =

There are 6 National Natural Landmarks in Wyoming. Three are canyons, one is a depression, one is a cliff, and the last is a stream that divides and flows into two oceans.

Wyoming National Natural Landmarks (clickable map)

Name	Image	Date	Location	County	Ownership	Description
The Big Hollow		November 1980	Laramie; 41.313209°N 105.721307°W	Albany	federal, private	A large wind eroded deflection basin.
Como Bluff		May 1966, November 1973	Rock River; 41.881384°N 106.076217°W	Albany	federal, state, private	A ridge noted for multiple significant fossil discoveries from the late Jurassic of the Mesozoic Era.
Crooked Creek Natural Area		1966		Big Horn	federal (Bighorn National Forest)	A rich source of fossils of Early Cretaceous land vertebrates.
Red Canyon		November 1980	Lander; 42.672087°N 108.658175°W	Fremont	federal, state, private	A canyon exposing a number of sedimentary formations as well as 10,000 years of human habitation.
Sand Creek		December 1984	40°59′49″N 105°46′14″W	Albany	federal, state, private	The most spectacular examples of cross-bedded sandstone and "topple blocks" in North America. NNL area extends across Colorado border.
Two Ocean Pass		October 1965	Teton Wilderness; 44.04293°N 110.17495°W	Teton	federal (Bridger-Teton National Forest)	A pass located on the continental divide. Here, at a place called Parting of the Waters, North Two Ocean Creek splits into its two distributaries which form the headwaters of Pacific Creek and Atlantic Creek. Waters from these two creeks ultimately flow the Pacific and Atlantic ocean drainages, respectively.

== See also ==
- List of National Historic Landmarks in Wyoming
