= Wind Erosion on European Light Soils =

EU Environment and Climate Programme research project

WEELS ("Wind Erosion on European Light Soils") was a research project funded as part of the EU Environment and Climate Programme, intended to develop a small-scale model of wind erosion at the level of individual farms and fields, based on research at three test sites in Lower Saxony, Scania, and Suffolk.

WEELS was a collaborative project between University College London, the Geological Survey of Lower Saxony (Niedersächsisches Landesamt für Bodenforschung) at the Institute of Soil Technology, Bremen, Lund University, and Wageningen University. It ran from 1997 to 2000.
