= Big Hollow (Wisconsin) =

American geological feature

Coordinates: 43°13′27″N 90°06′49″W

Big Hollow (elevation: 758 feet (231 m)) is a valley in Sauk County, in the U.S. state of Wisconsin. It runs approximately three miles long and three miles wide, and is located in the town of Spring Green. Big Hollow is recognized for a large-scale wetland restoration project that provides significant ecological benefits to the region, particularly flood attenuation, water quality protection, and improved habitats.

Big Hollow was named from its relatively large size.
