= 2018 Indian dust storms =

Lethal weather phenomenon in India, May 2018

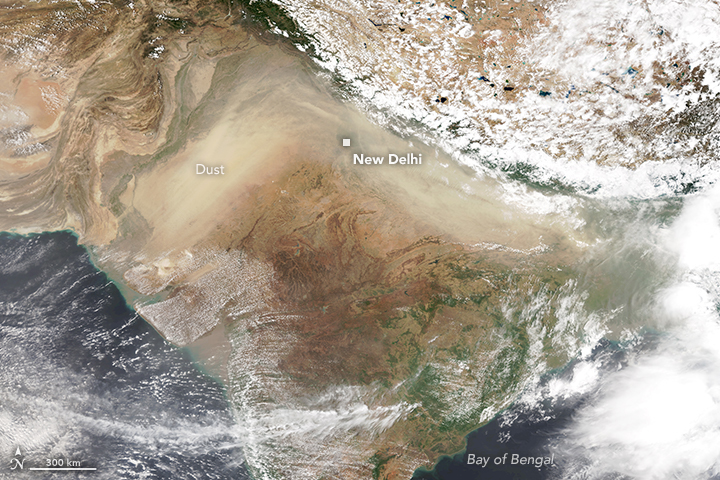
- Dust storms over North India
- Date: 2–3 May 2018
- Location: Uttar Pradesh, Rajasthan
- Type: Severe downbursts Bow echo
- Deaths: 125+
- Injuries: 200+

From 2 to 3 May 2018, an extremely severe dust storms swept across parts of North India. 125 people died and over 200 were injured.

In Uttar Pradesh, 43 died in the city of Agra and about 30 died elsewhere in the state. In neighboring Rajasthan, about 35 people died and over 200 were injured after powerful winds downed more than 8.000 electricity poles and uprooted hundreds of trees. Severe monsoon storms are not uncommon in the region; however, because these storms occurred at night and with greater wind speeds than average (>100 mph - >160 km/h), the death toll was higher than usual.

== Background ==
Dust storms are a feature of India's seasonal weather patterns. These storms typically occur in the summer months, when the weather has been dry to allow dust to be picked up by passing winds. The death toll in such storms rarely exceeds 12; a previous storm hit India on 11 April 2018, killing 19 people

== Damage ==
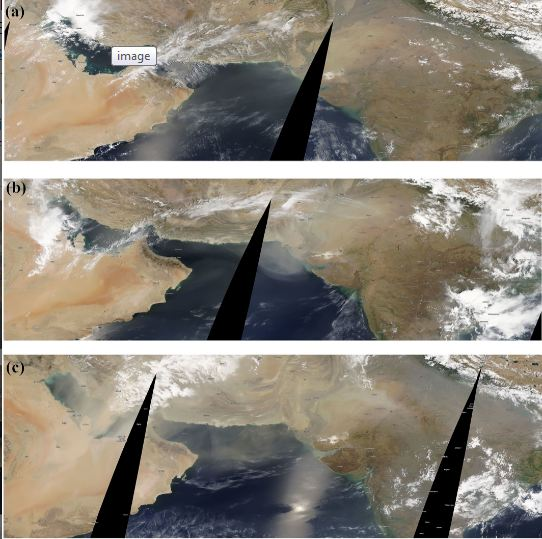
This is satellite image of india on dates of (a) 28 April, (b) 3 May and (c) 13 May

The dust storm occurred at the start of India's monsoon season. In the days prior, region meteorologists had forecast thunderstorms and high winds to occur over that week. Contributing to the storm was a period of abnormally high temperatures for the region, which increased the intensity of the weather system.

The dust storm first started late on 2 May 2018, predominantly hitting the states of Uttar Pradesh and Rajasthan. At least 73 people were killed in Uttar Pradesh, with 43 of those in the city of Agra; 21 people have been reported killed in Kheragarh, a town around 50 km south-west of the city. At least 35 people were killed in Rajasthan, with the Alwar district being the worst hit; the Bharatpur and Dholpur districts were also affected. Four people died in the state of Uttarakhand, and Delhi was also affected. More than 200 people were injured by the storm.

Officials stated that the storm was more devastating than prior dust storms as the stronger weather system carried more debris which caused more damage to homes and buildings, and because it struck at night, most were asleep and were unable to take precautions, leaving many killed or injured by falling structures. Most damage and fatalities were associated with high winds, rather than dust. In Rajasthan, electricity supplies were interrupted by 200–300 downed pylons, and schools were closed in the Alwar district.

Because conditions were still prime for more severe weather, the Uttar Pradesh government continued to plan to alert its citizens to weather conditions for the following 48 hours.

== Aftermath ==
The Government of Uttar Pradesh has announced compensation for the relatives of those killed amounting to ₹4 lakh (US$4,200).
