= The Big Hollow (Wyoming) =

- Location within Wyoming
- Location: South-east Wyoming
- Nearest city: Laramie
- Coordinates: 41°18′48″N 105°43′17″W
- Designated: 1980

The Big Hollow is a wind eroded deflation basin located to the west of Laramie, Wyoming in the United States. It is the second largest wind eroded depression in the world. (The Qattara Depression near Cairo, Egypt is the largest. ) The Big Hollow is the largest deflation basin in North America. The Big Hollow is an undrained basin and is 11 miles (18 km) long, 4 miles (6.4 km) wide, and up to 200 feet (61 m) deep.

The Big Hollow is younger than the alluvial valley floors which now form its boundaries and is therefore of Late Pleistocene age (less than 250,000 years). During most of the Pleistocene the Big Hollow was actually a hill composed of soft sedimentary bedrock. The material making up this former hill was much more easily eroded than the alluvial valley floors which bounded it to both the north and south. Eventually, the hill was washed and blown away and then the wind continued to erode a deflation basin into the soft bedrock. Eventually the former hill became lower than the river channels which once flowed around it. The geologists call this "topographic reversal". Oil was discovered in 1917 and the basin has been productive since. The basin is listed on the National Natural Landmark list.

== See also ==
- List of National Natural Landmarks in Wyoming
