= Round Head Period =

Earliest rock paintings of the Central Sahara

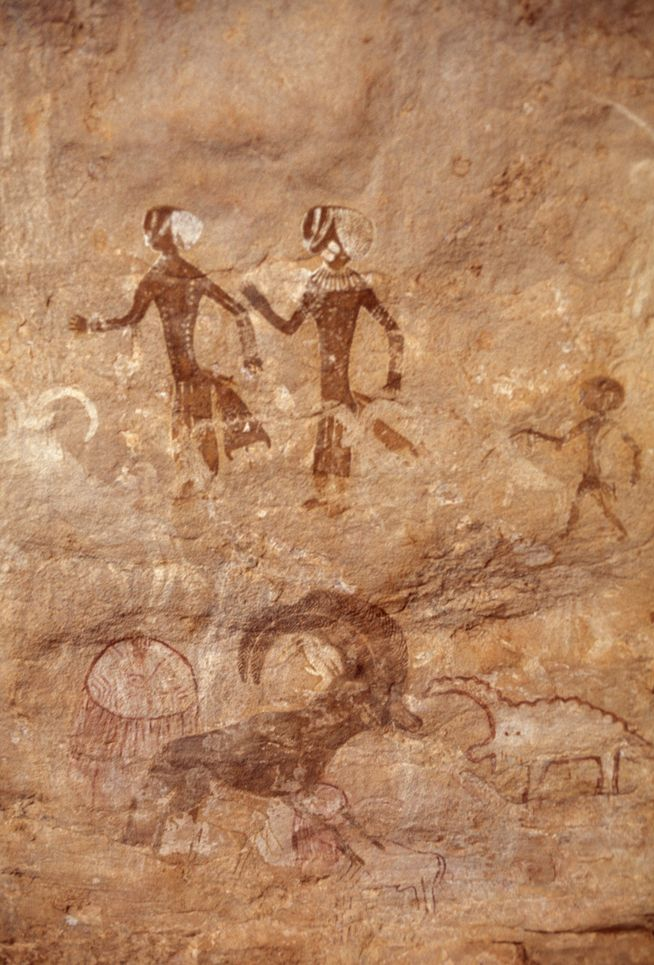
Round Head figures and zoomorphic figures, including a Barbary sheep

Round Head rock art is the earliest painted, monumental form of Central Saharan rock art, which was largely created from 9500 BP to 7500 BP and ceased being created by 3000 BP. The Round Head Period is preceded by the Kel Essuf Period and followed by the Pastoral Period. Round Head rock art number up to several thousand depictions in the Central Sahara. Human and undomesticated animal (e.g., Barbary sheep, antelope) artforms are usually portrayed, with a variety of details (e.g., dancing, ceremonies, masks, spiritual animal forms), in painted Round Head rock art. Painted Round Head rock art and engraved Kel Essuf rock art usually share the same region and occasionally the same rockshelters. The Round Head rock art of Tassili and the surrounding mountainous areas bear considerable similarity with traditional Sub-Saharan African cultures.

At the start of 10th millennium BP, amid the Epipaleolithic, the walls of rockshelters (e.g., Tin Torha, Tin Hanakaten) were used as a foundation for proto-village huts that families resided in, that were built against the rockshelters, as well as hearths, which may have been suitable for the mobile lifestyle of semi-sedentary Epipaleolithic hunter-gatherers. Epipaleolithic hunter-gatherers built a simple stone wall, dated to 10,508 ± 429 cal BP/9260 ± 290 BP, which may have been used for the purpose of serving as a windbreak. In 10,000 BP, Epipaleolithic hunter-gatherers, to some extent, engaged in processing of flora, and were specialists in the use of Barbary sheep (Ammotragus lervia). Though uncommon, ceramics and lithic complexes were also utilized. Hunters of the Epipaleolithic especially hunted Barbary sheep, among other animals, as well as utilized ceramics and basic lithic constructs between 10,000 BP to 8800 BP. Hunters of the Epipaleolithic, who possessed a sophisticated social organization, as well as exceptional stone tools and ceramics, created the Round Head rock art. Amid an early period of the Holocene, semi-settled Epipaleolithic and Mesolithic hunters, who created a refined material culture (e.g., stone tools, decorated pottery) as early as 10,000 BP, also created the engraved Kel Essuf and painted Round Head rock art styles located in the region (e.g., some in the Acacus, some in the Tadrart) of Libya, in the region (e.g., some in the Tadrart, most abundant in Tassili n'Ajjer) of Algeria, in the region (e.g., Djado) of Nigeria, and the region (e.g., Djado) of Niger.

Amid the early Sahara, Round Head rock artists, who had a sophisticated culture and engaged in the activity of hunting and gathering, also developed pottery, used vegetation, and managed animals. The cultural importance of shepherded Barbary sheep (Ammotragus lervia) is shown via their presence in Round Head rock art throughout the Central Sahara (e.g., Libyan region of Tadrart Acacus, Algerian region of Tassili n’Ajjer). Barbary sheep were corralled in stone enclosures near Uan Afuda cave. From up to 9500 BP, this continued until the beginning of the Pastoral Neolithic in the Sahara. Between 7500 BCE and 3500 BCE, amid the Green Sahara, undomesticated central Saharan flora were farmed, stored, and cooked, and domesticated animals (e.g., Barbary sheep) were milked and managed, by hunter-gatherers near the Takarkori rockshelter, which is representative of the broader Sahara; this continued until the beginning of the Pastoral Neolithic in the Sahara.

Between 8800 BP and 7400 BP, Mesolithic hunter-gatherers hunted different kinds of animals and used numerous grinding and flaking stone technologies and ceramics for the purpose of improving the overall number of undomesticated vegetation gathered. Among hunter-gatherers of the Mesolithic, there was use of ceramics, due to the increased settling and acquiring of undomesticated vegetation, and considerable use of lithic grinding tools, between 8800 BP and 7400 BP. At Uan Afuda, Mesolithic hunter-gatherer settlements had remnants of baskets with undomesticated vegetation within them and cords, which date between 8700 BP and 8300 BP.

== Classifications ==
Rock art is categorized into different groups (e.g., Bubaline, Kel Essuf, Round Heads, Pastoral, Caballine, Cameline), based on a variety of factors (e.g., art method, organisms, motifs, superimposed).

In 5000 BP, buffalo (Bubalus antiquus) in Africa underwent mass extinction; consequently, the engraved stone portrayals of these macroscopic, undomesticated buffalos in unenclosed rock art zones resulted in them being identified as Bubaline. In contrast, located in enclosed rock art zones, there are engraved Kel Essuf ("spirit of dead" in the Tuareg language) art, which portray short-armed, little human artforms with legs and penile appendages.

Human and undomesticated animal (e.g., Barbary sheep, antelope) artforms are usually portrayed, with a variety of details (e.g., dancing, ceremonies, masks, spiritual animal forms), in painted Round Head rock art. Painted Round Head rock art and engraved Kel Essuf rock art usually share the same region and occasionally the same rockshelters in contrast to engraved Bubaline rock art, which rarely appear in rock art zones where painted Round Head rock art is portrayed predominantly.

Compared to painted Round Head rock art, in addition to its art production method, depictions of domesticated cattle are what makes engraved/painted Pastoral rock art distinct; these distinct depictions in the Central Sahara serve as evidence for different populations entering the region. The decreased appearance of large undomesticated organisms and increased appearance of one-humped camels and horses depicted in latter rock art (e.g., Pastoral, Camelline, Cabelline) throughout the Sahara serves as evidence for the Green Sahara undergoing increased desiccation.

== Chronology ==
For the rock art of the Sahara, the most contentious among academic debates has remained the topic of chronology. Round Head, Kel Essuf, and Bubaline rock art, as the oldest chronological types, have been regarded as less certain compared to the younger chronological types (e.g., rock art depicting Saharan animals, which could be chronologically approximated to a specific timespan). Consequently, two types of chronologies (i.e., high chronology, low chronology) were developed.

The date for Bubaline rock art was approximated to the late period of the Pleistocene or early period of the Holocene using remnants of clay, manganese, and iron oxide in the dark hued patina. Rock walls were estimated to have developed between 9200 BP and 5500 BP using substances of organic origin found within the depths of the rock walls. The Qurta petroglyphs of prehistoric Egypt, which portray undomesticated animals, has been estimated to a minimum of 15,000 BP; this has been used as an additional consideration for Bubaline rock art dating well before 10,000 BP.

While the Kel Essuf rock art and Bubaline rock art have not been found layered above one another, in addition to the Kel Essuf rock art being found within a dark hued patina, it has been found layered beneath Round Head rock art. Due to the layering and the artistic commonalities between the Kel Essuf rock art and Round Head rock art of the Central Sahara, the engraved Kel Essuf rock art is regarded to be the artistic precursor to the painted Round Head rock art.

Credence to the high chronology is given via decoratively detailed Saharan ceramics dated to 10,726 BP. A spatula and lithic grinding tools with ocher remnants on them, which serves as evidence of painting, were found in an Acacus rockshelter with Round Head rock art. Paint from Round Head rock art in the region (e.g., Acacus) of Libya was also tested and dated to 6379 BP. Altogether, these show continuation of the Round Head rock art tradition well into the Pastoral Period.

Based on 13 sediment samples from the floor directly at or near the walls of Round Head rock art in Sefar and Ti-n-Tazarift, and determined via the optically stimulated luminescence dating method, the Round Head rock art may have been created amid the Holocene and may have a terminus ante quem date of 9000 BP to 10,000 BP. Most scholars are of the view that, from 9500 BP to 7500 BP, Round Head rock artists created Round Head rock art.

== Climate ==
From 60,000 BP or 40,000 BP to 20,000 BP, the Aterian culture existed. Between 16th to 15th millennium BP, the environment was humid. From 20,000 BP to 13,000 BP, there was a varied climate system. The high elevated regions with mountains were considerably more wet than low elevated regions without mountains, which led to the variation in climate. Regions of high elevation had occurrences of considerable rainfall, to the extent that lakes developed, whereas, regions of low elevation had occurrences of considerable dryness. Amid the late period of the Pleistocene, with its varied climate system, the mountainous environment remained sufficiently humid, which allowed for animal, plant, and human life to be sustained.

== Origins of the Round Head Rock Art ==
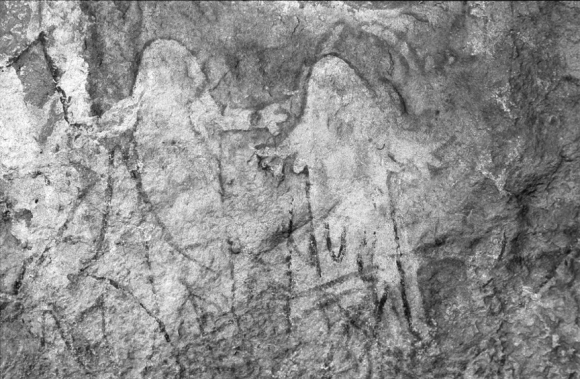
Djado Plateau: example of painting from the Round Heads depicting an anthropomorph very close to the Kel Essuf model

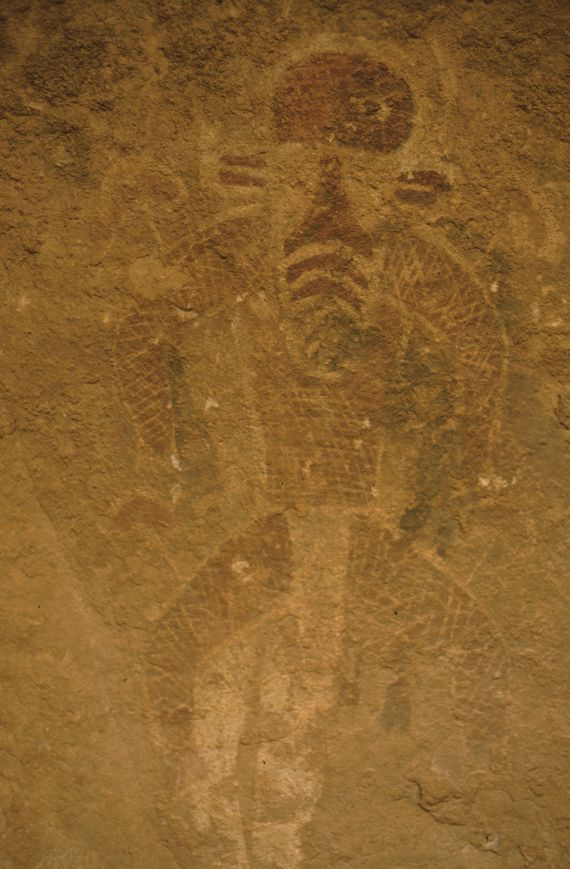
Round Head figure wearing a Barbary sheep-styled mask

Mori (1967) first hypothesized that Round Head rock art evolved from Kel Essuf rock art in the Acacus region; this hypothesized evolution of one rock art type into another receives support due to Round Head rock art having been superimposed upon Kel Essuf rock art in the Tadrart of Algeria. The superimposed state of Round Head rock art upon Kel Essuf rock art is viewed as showing that Kel Essuf rock art chronologically precedes Round Head rock art and is also perceived as a pattern of development, from simpler detailed Kel Essuf engravings to more complexly detailed (e.g., fingers) Round Head paintings. Mori (1967) has found continued support by Hallier & Hallier (1999) and Streidter et al. (2002 – 2003).

The striking likenesses between the Kel Essuf and Round Head rock artforms, along with likeness in shape, include the following notable traits: forms shaped like a “half-moon” connected to the shoulder(s), engraved forms shaped like a “half-moon” near “figures”, forms bearing bows and sticks, and horns atop the heads of the Kel Essuf forms that are like the Round Head forms in configuration (e.g., shape, position). Due to the absence of these likenesses in Pastoral rock artforms, these likenesses may be concluded as cultural particularities unique to the hunter-gatherers who created the Kel Essuf and Round Head rock artforms.

A cultural particularity unique to the Kel Essuf rock art, in contrast to the Round Head rock art, are penile forms; these penile forms, or additional appendages, may be indicative of maleness, and may be absent from the Round Head rock art due to taboo. Aside this absence, both the Kel Essuf and Round Head rock art are largely composed of male artforms.

Comparative analysis of the rock art from Tassili n’Ajjer and Djado resulted in the conclusion that the Round Head rock art of Djado was the precursor to the Round Head rock art of Tassili n’Ajjer. With the enneris of the mountainous area of Djado as its origin, the creators of the Round Head rock art of Djado migrated, from Djado to Tassili, and, as continuation of the Djado artistic tradition, produced the Round Head rock art of Tassili n’Ajjer.

The "pecked Djado-Roundheads", or Kel Essuf rock art, in the Djado mountains of northern Niger are viewed as having great likeness with the Round Head rock art in the region (e.g., Tadrart, Tassili) of Algeria and to some rock art in the region (e.g., Acacus) of Libya; hence, this is viewed as showing that the hunting societies who created these rock art were of the same cultural unit and cultural ideology, though having cultural varieties unique to each area.

While the Round Head rock art is found in less abundance in the mountainous regions (e.g., Tadrart, Acacus) of Algeria and Libya, it is found in greatest abundance in the plateau area of Tassili. The precursors for Round Head rock art may have originated in the mountainous northern area (e.g., Adrar Bous, Air) of Niger. These areas are viewed as archaeologically similar (e.g., pottery). Undomesticated flora and animals were used in Epipaleolithic and Mesolithic hunter-gatherer cultures between 10,000 BP and 8000 BP as well as 8800 BP and 7400 BP. Based on the dates acquired for the ceramics in the northern Sahara (8th millennium BP), Tibesti (8949 BP), Libya (8950 BP), and Tin Hanakaten (9420 BP), the core area for the most ancient ceramics of the Sahara may have likely been in the shared region (e.g., Tassili, Air, Adrar Bous) of Niger and Algeria. The Round Head rock artists may have originated in this core area, and may have had a cultural practice of association, via long distance, among other Round Head rock artists. The emergence and expansion of ceramics in the Sahara may be linked with the origin of both the Round Head and Kel Essuf rock art, which occupy rockshelters in the same regions (e.g., Djado, Acacus, Tadrart) as well as have common resemblances (e.g., traits, shapes) with one another.

== Round Head Rock Art and Hunter-Gatherers ==
=== Round Head Rock Art ===
Round Head rock art is the earliest painted rock art in the Central Sahara. Round Head rock art number up to several thousand depictions in the Central Sahara. In the region (e.g., Tassili, Tadrart) of Algeria and region (e.g., Acacus) of Libya, there are at least 149 painted body images, 85 stick holder images, 77 horned images, and 34 bow bearer images that have been recognized. In the Tassili region, there are at least 55 arm band wearing images, 43 images with traits similar to form to a "T", 22 connected and 20 disconnected forms shaped like a "half-moon", and 7 "Great God" images. The Round Head rock art of Tassili n’Ajjer are located in urban-like lithic complexes (e.g., rock shelters, rock arches, rock canyons). The final period of the Round Head rock art portrayals have been characterized as Negroid (e.g., dominant mandible, big lips, rounded nose). A distinct portrayal of a single, domesticated cow created in the Round Head rock art style may serve as evidence for some of the hunter-gatherers, who created the Round Head rock art, adopting the culture of cattle pastoralism from incoming cattle pastoralists.

The Round Head rock art tradition is a continuation of the Kel Essuf rock art tradition. While Bubaline rock art does not give prominence to humans, Round Head rock art does give prominence to humans; the difference in human prominence depicted by Bubaline rock artists and Round Head rock artists, as indicative of increasing awareness of the importance and agency of humans, may be viewed as a representational transition in Central Saharan rock art from the Paleolithic period toward the Neolithic period. Buffalo, cattle, crocodiles, and fish are portrayed in Round Head rock art. Round Head rock art also features depictions related to agriculture and animal domestication; for example, there is Round Head rock art at Tassili N’Ajjer that features a muzzled antelope.

During the early period of the Holocene, Round Head rock art was created at Tassili N'Ajjer, in Algeria, and at Tadrart Acacus, in Libya, 70% of which is composed of anthropomorphic art forms; male and female art forms feature scarification marks that differ; linear design patterns are exclusive to male art forms, whereas, crescent-shaped and concentric circular design patterns are exclusive to female art forms. Between the 5th millennium BCE and the 4th millennium BCE, the Central Saharan rock art depiction of a horned running woman, who may have been a goddess or a dancer with body scarification markings (e.g., breasts, belly, thighs, shoulders, calves), was created by Africans, during the Round Head Period of Tassili N’Ajjer, in Tanzoumaitak, Algeria.

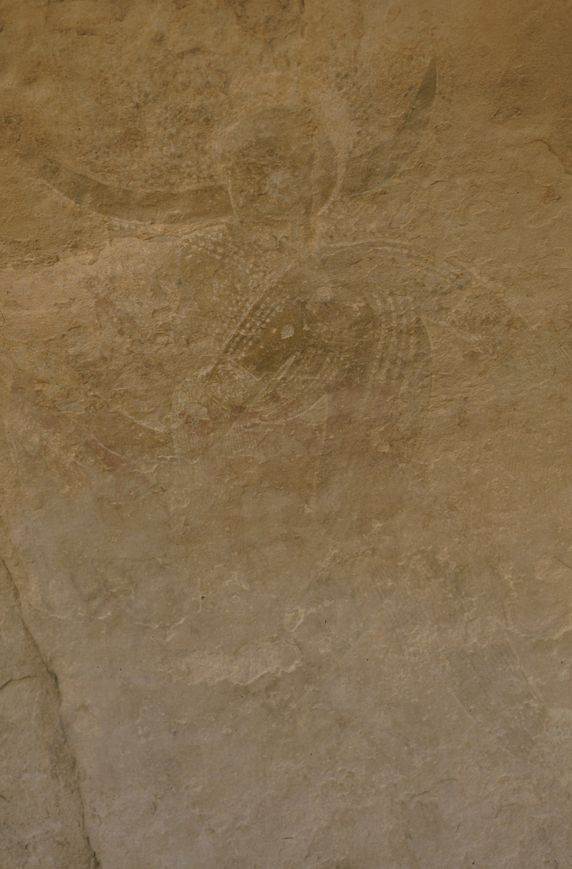
Round Head depiction of a horned running woman with body scarification markings, who may have been a goddess or a dancer

=== Hunter-Gatherers ===
Central Saharan hunter-gatherers, such as those of the Acacus region, had a sense of monumentality. While architectural monuments used for the purpose of dwelling or ritual are absent from the Central Sahara amid the early period of the Holocene, Round Head rock art may be viewed as monumental Central Saharan rock art amid the early period of the Holocene. The possibility of there being some hunter-gatherers who did not create any rock art in the Central Sahara has also been previously raised.

The creators of the Round Head rock art possessed dark skin. The dark-skinned ethnic groups, who created the Round Head rock art, differed from Tuareg Berbers. Long-dwelling Tuareg from the same area also recognized the Round Head rock art as a creation of black people who resided in the Tassili region long ago. The dark skin complexion of the hunters who created the Round Head rock art was verified via the testing of skin samples taken from human remains located in the Acacus region of Libya and the Tassili region of Algeria.

In the Acacus region, at the Uan Muhuggiag rockshelter, there was a child mummy (5405 ± 180 BP) and an adult (7823 ± 95 BP/7550 ± 120 BP). In the Tassili n'Ajjer region, at Tin Hanakaten rockshelter, there was a child (7900 ± 120 BP/8771 ± 168 cal BP), with cranial deformations due to disease or artificial cranial deformation that bears a resemblance with ones performed among Neolithic-era Nigerians, as well as another child and three adults (9420 ± 200 BP/10,726 ± 300 cal BP). Based on examination of the Uan Muhuggiag child mummy and Tin Hanakaten child, the results verified that these Central Saharan peoples from the Epipaleolithic, Mesolithic, and Pastoral periods possessed dark skin complexions. Soukopova (2013) thus concludes: “The osteological study showed that the skeletons could be divided into two types, the first Melano-African type with some Mediterranean affinities, the other a robust Negroid type. Black people of different appearance were therefore living in the Tassili and most probably in the whole Central Sahara as early as the 10th millennium BP."

==== Cultural history ====
At the start of 10th millennium BP, amid the Epipaleolithic, the walls of rockshelters (e.g., Tin Torha, Tin Hanakaten) were used as a foundation for proto-village huts that families resided in, as well as hearths, which may have been suitable for the mobile lifestyle of semi-sedentary Epipaleolithic hunter-gatherers. Epipaleolithic hunter-gatherers built a simple stone wall, dated to 10,508 ± 429 cal BP/9260 ± 290 BP, which may have been used for the purpose of serving as a windbreak. In 10,000 BP, Epipaleolithic hunter-gatherers, to some extent, engaged in processing of flora, and were specialists in the use of Barbary sheep (Ammotragus lervia). Though uncommon, ceramics and lithic complexes were also used. Hunters of the Epipaleolithic especially hunted Barbary sheep, among other animals, as well as used ceramics and basic lithic constructs between 10,000 BP to 8800 BP. Hunters of the Epipaleolithic, who possessed a sophisticated social organization, as well as exceptional stone tools and ceramics, created the Round Head rock art. Amid an early period of the Holocene, semi-settled Epipaleolithic and Mesolithic hunters, who created a refined material culture (e.g., stone tools, decorated pottery) as early as 10,000 BP, also created the engraved Kel Essuf and painted Round Head rock art styles located in the region (e.g., some in the Acacus, some in the Tadrart) of Libya, in the region (e.g., some in the Tadrart, most abundant in Tassili n'Ajjer) of Algeria, in the region (e.g., Djado) of Nigeria, and the region (e.g., Djado) of Niger.

In the Tadrart Acacus region of Libya, hunter-gatherers may have begun to dwell starting between 10,721 cal BP and 10,400 cal BP. Hunter-gatherers dwelled in various locations at Tin Torha (e.g., Torha East, Torha North, Two Caves). At Torha East, hunter-gatherers used bones, lustrous lithic items, ostrich eggshells, and pottery. Flora (e.g., Brachiaria, Echinochloa, Panicoideae, Panicum, Pennisetum, Sorghum/Andropogoneae) also was increasingly used in concert with lithic tools purposed for grinding and pottery purposed for boiling. The earliest bone tool at Torha Two Caves dates between 9774 cal BP and 9534 cal BP and the earliest bone tool at Torha East Rinf dates between 9679 cal BP and 9536 cal BP.

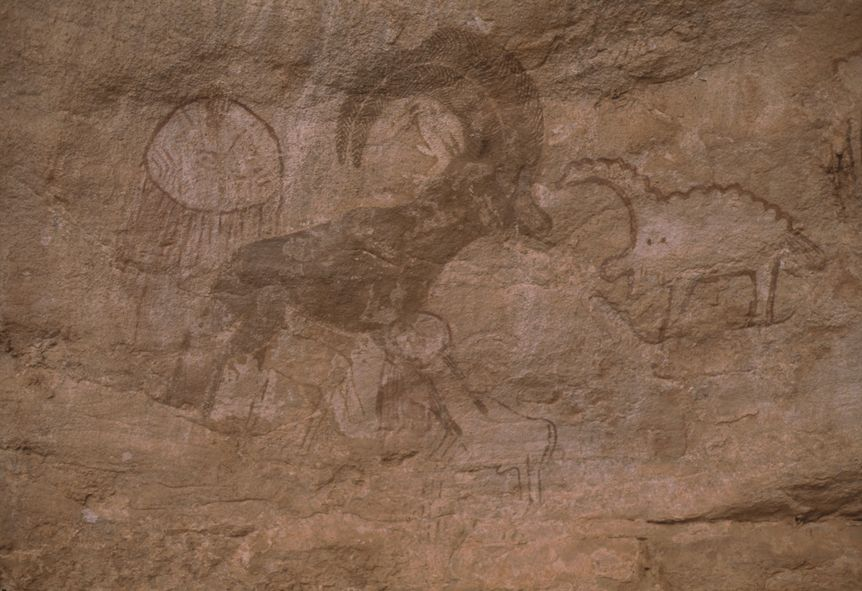
Zoomorphic figures, including a Barbary sheep

Most bone tools were found in Torha East. Bone tools derive from various kinds of fauna (e.g., Ammotragus lervia, Bird, Canis aureus, Gazella dorcas, Large Bovid, Phacochoerus aethiopicus, Vulpes rueppelli). A bone tool, with decorations, may have been used as a handle for a leadership emblem. A human bone, which may show evidence of human intervention, is also present. Various debitage methods (e.g., fracturing, sawing) were employed on selected bones, using various kinds of lithic implements (e.g., blades, bladelets, flakes), along with methods (e.g., abrasion, scraping) to form the bone tools. The process occurred locally and the type of lithic implements used in the process of forming the bone tools may have also been used to grind ochre and process flora. Bone tool decorations may reflect a style and design that derive from basket weaving (e.g., basketware, cords), which may be similar to basket weaving (e.g., basketry, rope) and pottery design found in the Acacus region.

The distinct designs of the various bone objects (e.g., item with an hourglass shape, spatula-knife made from a warthog tooth, two pendants, leadership emblem), which were expertly created, designed, and used by the Tin Torha hunter-gatherers, may have served as collective identity markers and those created bone objects may have served a vital purpose in trade with other groups.

Amid the early Sahara, Round Head rock artists, who had a sophisticated culture and engaged in the activity of hunting and gathering, also developed pottery, used vegetation, and managed animals. The cultural importance of shepherded Barbary sheep (Ammotragus lervia) is shown via their presence in Round Head rock art throughout the Central Sahara (e.g., Libyan region of Tadrart Acacus, Algerian region of Tassili n’Ajjer). Barbary sheep were corralled in stone enclosures near Uan Afuda cave. From up to 9500 BP, this continued until the beginning of the Pastoral Neolithic in the Sahara. Between 7500 BCE and 3500 BCE, amid the Green Sahara, undomesticated central Saharan flora were farmed, stored, and cooked, and domesticated animals (e.g., Barbary sheep) were milked and managed, by hunter-gatherers near the Takarkori rockshelter, which is representative of the broader Sahara; this continued until the beginning of the Pastoral Neolithic in the Sahara.

Between 8800 BP and 7400 BP, Mesolithic hunter-gatherers hunted different kinds of animals and used numerous grinding and flaking stone technologies and ceramics for the purpose of improving the overall number of undomesticated vegetation gathered. Among hunter-gatherers of the Mesolithic, there was use of ceramics, due to the increased settling and acquiring of undomesticated vegetation, and considerable use of lithic grinding tools, between 8800 BP and 7400 BP. At Uan Afuda, Mesolithic hunter-gatherer settlements had remnants of baskets with undomesticated vegetation within them and cords, which date between 8700 BP and 8300 BP.

Before the migration of cattle herders into Jebel Uweinat between 4400 BCE and 3300 BCE, African hunter-gatherers may have created the painted Round Head rock art at Jebel Uweinat.

With the Green Sahara undergoing desertification, the formal finish of Round Head paintings occurred by 3000 BP.

== Ethnography ==
The Round Head rock art of Tassili and the surrounding mountainous areas bear considerable similarity with traditional Sub-Saharan African cultures. As one of the primary aspects of Sub-Saharan African cultures are their conservative values, despite change in the material economy, mainstay values remain (e.g., women's role to bear and rear children, men's participation in ceremony to facilitate the positive passing of time). The creators of the Round Head rock art possessed dark skin. The dark-skinned ethnic groups, who created the Round Head rock art, differed from Tuareg Berbers.

Traditional Sub-Saharan African cultures bear notable likeness with Round Head rock art. For example, men predominantly partake in the primary ceremonies of traditional Sub-Saharan African cultures, while women may neither obtain in-depth sacred understanding (e.g., creation myths) nor partake in many of the ceremonies. Sub-Saharan African ceremonies being predominantly acted out by men and spiritual knowledge being reserved for men who have been ritually initiated culturally corresponds with 95% of Round Head rock art depictions being men.

Masks are a regular theme in both Round Head rock art and modern African cultures. A limited group of men (e.g., male relatives of the dead and their ancestors, male ritual initiates) are permitted to make physical contact with secret masks. The repeated painting over of Round Head rock art in Tassili is similar to the repeated painting over that occurs for young male initiates in Mali rockshelters (where masks are kept), among the Dogon people.

A vital aspect for young male and female initiates of Sub-Saharan African ceremonies to partake in is body painting. Body painting symbolisms are regularly used for the purpose of petitioning spirits for improved reproductive capability and security. Young male initiates receive the spiritual emblem of the stick to denote peace and wisdom; afterward, men who have been initiated receive the reserved hunting emblem of the bow. Traditional Sub-Saharan African cultures regularly use horn emblems in reference to their focus on improved reproductive capability and development. Comparatively, Round Head rock art may have been created, in specially chosen rockshelters, by initiating individuals who were undergoing ceremonial rites. As with the Nigerien Songhai, who wore large middle finger rings to provide security against forces that can harm and malevolent spirits, the bands, worn by 90% of male Round Head rock artforms, may have been worn to provide a similar kind of spiritual security.

There are considerable affinities between Sub-Saharan Africans and Round Head rock art in the performative roles of women. For example, in many traditional Sub-Saharan African cultures, men are usually the primary ceremonial leaders and women are usually performing secondary, but, nevertheless, essential functions, within ceremonies. Men usually are the primary actors in central ceremonies of varying purpose (e.g., healing, fire, rainmaking) and women are secondary actors who contribute musically, vocally, and rhythmically. While men become psychologically entranced, via dance, women provide aid to men (e.g., Southern African San women musically encircling San men as they dance around a fire). First menstrual cycle rites are an example of ceremonies where women are the primary actors. Comparatively, ceremonial depictions in Round Head rock art (e.g., at Tan Zoumaitak) portray female human artforms bearing sticks and rounded forms connected to their arms.

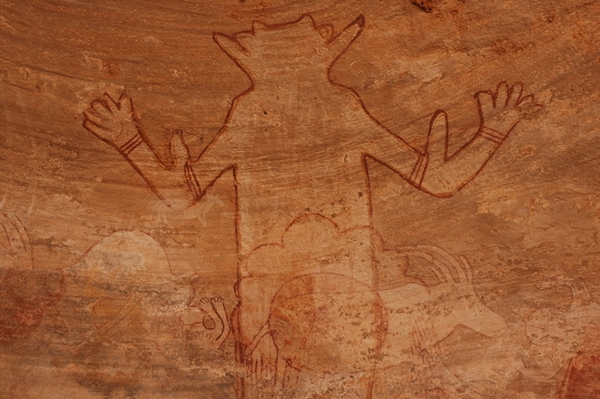
Great God figure

Common traits between Round Head rock art and Sub-Saharan African cultures include concepts of down-headed animals and mighty deities. Down-headed animals, which appear in South African rock art, and portray shamanic animal sacrifice as a rainfall ritual, also appear in Round Head rock art. In the Round Head rock art of Tassili, mighty deities are portrayed centrally on rockshelter walls. Comparatively, throughout Sub-Saharan African cultures, rocks and caves are regularly viewed as being inhabited by spirits and awe-inspiring mountains of high elevation regularly viewed as being habitations of the divine.

The considerable commonalities, absent in modern North African cultures, are present and able to be found between Round Head paintings and modern Sub-Saharan African cultures. Saharan ceramics are viewed as having clear likeness with the oldest ceramics found in Djenne-Djenno, which have been dated to 250 BCE. The egalitarian civilization of Djenne-Djenno was likely established by the Mande progenitors of the Bozo people, which spanned from 3rd century BCE to 13th century CE. The masks found in Round Head paintings bear close resemblance with masks found in modern Sub-Saharan African cultures. Among other parts of Sub-Saharan Africa, but especially in Mali, Niger, and Chad, the conservativeness of traditional Sub-Saharan African cultures shown; symbolisms found in Round Head paintings are also found in these cultures, which may be indication of cultural continuity.

With the exception of the depicted artform of a giraffe, depicted artforms of undomesticated animals, animals that were favored for hunting, and hunting situations, are absent from the Round Head rock art at Jebel Uweinat. Rather, Round Head rock art at Jebel Uweinat is primarily composed of human artforms, with archers that wield bows (e.g., long bows) and arrows composing 9% of the overall rock art. Some parts (e.g., arms) of the polychrome-colored human artforms, which may have had body embellishments, were red-colored and other parts (e.g., loincloths, accessories, some hairstyles, bows and arrows, large armbands) were white-colored. Though likely more, at least 43% of Round Head rock art at Jebel Uweinat portrays traditional African dance.

As found in traditional African cultures (e.g., tattoos, scarification), some human artforms may have had body modifications (e.g., facial tattoos) and hairstyles (e.g., chignons). 2% of the overall human artforms (i.e., six) have hands and fingers, and some may have had closed fists. The human artforms were generally portrayed as figures with thickly muscled arms and legs. Human artforms consisted of both men and women, though women numbered up to nine in total (4% of overall human artforms). Some aspects of the rock art, though increasingly rare, may have portrayed a mother and her children. There may have also been portrayal of two supernatural individuals.

Out of the 146 various ways that human artforms were portrayed, 35% were symmetric-armed and standing, 16% were asymmetric-armed and standing, 16% were bent-on-knees, 11% had one leg free, 11% were running and walking, 10% were kneeling and sitting, and 1% were jumping or tiptoeing.

Among symmetric-armed human artforms, there are individuals portrayed in combat-ready poses. There are also individuals depicted in an "A-pose" – the most common of depicted posted in the Round Head rock art at Uweinat, which, in West African art, bears the meaning of a person who is alive in contrast to a person is dead, and in African dance, is usually the starting stance that bears the meaning of unlimited expressive possibility. Among asymmetric-armed human artforms, one man is depicted with an extended arm and clenched fist, and another arm drawn back for a subsequent strike. There is also the depicted situation of what may be an adult protecting two children (or two human artforms depicted smaller for unclear an unclear purpose).

Among bent-on-knees human artforms, there are semi-squatted individuals. These depicted individuals may portray, as is found throughout Sub-Saharan Africa and among the African diaspora (e.g., African Americans), a set of traditional African dance techniques known as "getting down." There is also a situation depicting African dance and likely involving a person of elite stature. The most notable of situations for bent-on-knees human artforms is one portraying two dancing individuals, with white-colored halos around their heads, which may denote the attainment of a particular psychological/spiritual state as a result of the energetic, rhythmic African dance.

Among one leg free human artforms, there are depictions of African dance involving squat-and-kick movements. Two women with chignon hairstyles engaging in what may have been choreographed African dance movements. Among human artforms (e.g., jumping or tiptoeing, running/walking), there are individuals with chignons. Among kneeling and sitting human artforms, there are more individuals portrayed sitting than kneeling.

== Legacy ==
There is an abundance of ancient rock art (e.g., paintings, petroglyphs) in the Algerian Tadrart and Tassili as well as the Libyan Acacus regions of the Sahara. The region was initially peopled by gatherers and hunters in 10,000 BP, and then, peopled by cattle herders in 7500 BP, which gave rise to pastoralism in the region. The cattle and sheep pastoralists, who once occupied higher elevated areas (e.g., mountainous refugia) in 7500 BP, due to increased desertification, likely migrated into lower elevated areas (e.g., near lakes) for part-time settlement prior to 5000 BP. Pastoralists after 5000 BP occupied higher and lower elevated areas on a seasonal basis and possessed often-used lithic grinding tools, ceramics (plain in detail), and, with heightened use, distantly located resources.

As cattle pastoralism had endured in the Sahara since 7500 BP, Central Saharan hunters and herders may have lived together in a common area for a long period of time. Desertification may have resulted in migrations from the Central Saharan region, where the Round Head paintings are located, toward Lake Chad and the Niger Delta. While some migrated south of the Sahara, other Central Saharan hunter-gatherers may have taken on the custom of pastoralism (e.g., herding domesticated cattle and goats). Given the opportunity to become socially distinguished, to develop food surplus, as well as to acquire and aggregate wealth, this led to the adoption of a domestic cattle pastoral economy by some Central Saharan hunter-gatherers. In exchange, cultural information regarding use of vegetation (e.g., Cenchrus, Digitaria) in the Central Sahara (e.g., Uan Tabu, Uan Muhuggiag) was shared by Central Saharan hunter-gatherers with incoming Early Pastoral peoples.

Migration of hunter-gatherers and cattle herders out of the Central Sahara occurred as the Green Sahara underwent desertification in 4000 BP. Seasonal waterways were the likely migratory route taken to the Niger River, Chad Basin, and Nile Valley. Dwelling in the Sahelian region began to occur as long inhabited settlement and funerary sites of the northern region of Niger stopped being used. Migration of Central Saharan peoples into the Sahelian region of Sub-Saharan Africa is verified via Saharan influenced pottery that appear in the Sahelian region.

As late as 2500 BP in the Central Sahara, groups from the Round Head period may have continued to persist as hunters. Central Saharan hunter-gatherers, amid the Horse period of the Central Sahara, were identified by Herodotus as "Aithiopian Troglodytes", who are indicated to have been pursued by Garamantes. Contrary to the popular academic myth of North Africans (e.g., Garamantes) engaging in the chariot-driven capture, enslavement, and trade of Sub-Saharan West Africans during classical antiquity, there were equitable transactions of materials (e.g., gold) made between Sub-Saharan West Africans and North Africans (e.g., Carthaginians).
