= Bubalus Period =

Earliest Period of Central Saharan rock art

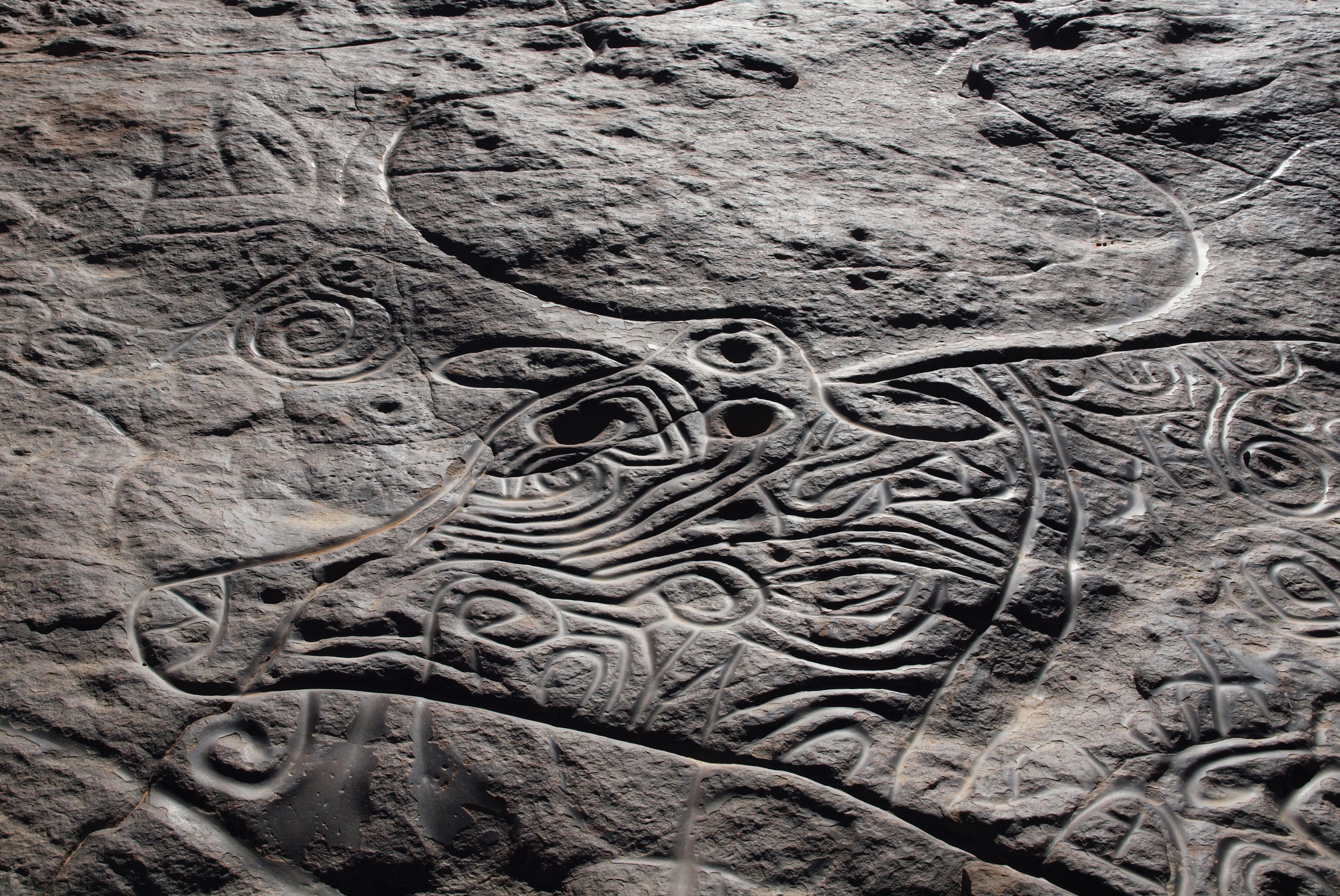
Rock carving of the eponymous bubalus

Bubalus, Bubaline, or Large Wild Fauna rock art is the earliest form of Central Saharan rock art, created in an engraved style, which have been dated between 12,000 BCE and 8000 BCE. The Bubaline Period is followed by the Kel Essuf Period. As the animal world is particularly emphasized in Bubaline rock art, animal depictions are usually shown in larger scale than human depictions. Bubaline rock art portrays a few geometric designs and naturalistic outlined depictions of animals, such as antelope, aurochs, buffalos (Bubalus antiquus/Syncerus complexus), donkeys, elephants, fish (e.g., catfish, Nile perch), giraffes, hippopotamuses, ostriches, and rhinoceroses.

== Classifications ==
Rock art is categorized into different groups (e.g., Bubaline, Kel Essuf, Round Heads, Pastoral, Caballine, Cameline), based on a variety of factors (e.g., art method, organisms, motifs, superimposed).

In 5000 BP, buffalo (Bubalus antiquus) in Africa underwent mass extinction; consequently, the engraved stone portrayals of these macroscopic, undomesticated buffalos in unenclosed rock art zones resulted in them being identified as Bubaline. In contrast, located in enclosed rock art zones, there are engraved Kel Essuf ("spirit of dead" in the Tuareg language) rock art, which portray short-armed, little human artforms with legs and penile appendages.

== Chronology ==
For the rock art of the Sahara, the most contentious among academic debates has remained the topic of chronology. Round Head, Kel Essuf, and Bubaline rock art, as the oldest chronological types, have been regarded as less certain compared to the younger chronological types (e.g., rock art depicting Saharan animals, which could be chronologically approximated to a specific timespan). Consequently, two types of chronologies (i.e., high chronology, low chronology) were developed.

The date for Bubaline rock art was approximated to the late period of the Pleistocene or early period of the Holocene using remnants of clay, manganese, and iron oxide in the dark hued patina. Rock walls were estimated to have developed between 9200 BP and 5500 BP using substances of organic origin found within the depths of the rock walls. The Qurta rock art of prehistoric Egypt, which portray undomesticated animals, has been estimated to a minimum of 15,000 BP; this has been used as an additional consideration for Bubaline rock art dating much earlier than 10,000 BP.

While the Kel Essuf rock art and Bubaline rock art have not been found layered above one another, in addition to the Kel Essuf rock art being found within a dark hued patina, it has been found layered beneath Round Head rock art. Due to the layering and the artistic commonalities between the Kel Essuf rock art and Round Head rock art of the Central Sahara, the engraved Kel Essuf rock art is regarded to be the artistic precursor to the painted Round Head rock art.

Credence to the high chronology is given via decoratively detailed Saharan ceramics dated to 10,726 BP. A spatula and lithic grinding tools with ocher remnants on them, which serves as evidence of painting, were found in an Acacus rockshelter with Round Head rock art. Paint from Round Head rock art in the region (e.g., Acacus) of Libya was also tested and dated to 6379 BP. Altogether, these show continuation of the Round Head rock art tradition well into the Pastoral Period.

== Climate ==
From 60,000 BP or 40,000 BP to 20,000 BP, the Aterian culture existed. Between 16th to 15th millennium BP, the environment was humid. From 20,000 BP to 13,000 BP, there was a varied climate system. The high elevated regions with mountains were considerably more wet than low elevated regions without mountains, which led to the variation in climate. Regions of high elevation had occurrences of considerable rainfall, to the extent that lakes developed, whereas, regions of low elevation had occurrences of considerable dryness. Amid the late period of the Pleistocene, with its varied climate system, the mountainous environment remained sufficiently humid, which allowed for animal, plant, and human life to be sustained.

== Origins of the Bubaline Rock Art ==
According to Lhote (1976), the origin of the Bubaline rock art may be found in the activities of the ethnic groups that "occupied, in the Neolithic, the pre-Saharan Atlas, the Constantinois, the Fezzan and the Tassili while these regions benefited from a very humid climate under which the great fauna, known as Ethiopian, could live without difficulty."

Most engraved Bubaline rock art appear in the northern region of Tassili, at Wadi Djerat. Levallois instruments in the area may indicate that Bubaline rock art was developed by Aterians. Due to the archaeological spread of the Aterian culture and unique linguistic spread of the Niger-Congo languages (e.g., languages of the Atlantic coast in Senegal, Kordofan in Sudan), Fleming et al. (2013) indicates that possibly the “Nilo-Saharan linguistic phylum is derived from the Aterian culture area.” Fleming et al. (2013) further states: “A genetic relationship between these two phyla has been proposed by a few linguists, e.g. Edgar Gregersen (1972). Murdock (1959) assembled evidence of the priority of “Negroids” in the Sahara before the advent of Berbers and Arabs there and associated them with the Niger-Congo and Nilo-Saharan linguistic phyla.”

== Bubaline Rock Art and Hunter-Gatherers ==
=== Bubaline Rock Art ===
Map of rock art in the Sahara

The majority of the rock engravings in the Large Wild Fauna style are located in what is known as the Maghreb region of the Sahara, encompassing a wide area spanning across Algeria, Morocco, and Tunisia – specifically, the Fezzan region of southwestern Libya. Engraved Large Wild Fauna rock art, which have been created in a naturalistic style, can be found in the northern region of Tassili N'Ajjer, at Oued Djerat. While engraved Kel Essuf rock art are mostly located in groups on the walls of rockshelters, engraved Bubaline rock art located in unenclosed areas, such as boulders, and broadly distributed throughout such areas. While engraved Kel Essuf rock art is commonly located in the same rockshelters as painted Round Head rock art, engraved Bubaline rock art is not.

The naturalistic depictions of animals were drawn at scale, isolated, and with a demonstrated deliberateness that indicates these large animals were of particular significance in the human world, or that these large animals were hunted by these socially organized hunter-gatherers. As the animal world is particularly emphasized in Bubaline rock art, animal depictions are usually shown in larger scale than human depictions. Bubaline rock art portrays a few geometric designs and naturalistic outlined depictions of animals, such as antelope, aurochs, buffalos (Bubalus antiquus), donkeys, elephants, fish (e.g., catfish, Nile perch), giraffes, hippopotamuses, ostriches, and rhinoceroses. The extinct Bubalus antiquus, which has been renamed Syncerus complexus, may have continued to persist in some regions of the Central Sahara until 5000 BP. While antelope and Barbary sheep characterize and may have had cultural significance for the artists of the painted Round Head rock art, buffalos, elephants, and giraffes characterize and may have had cultural significance for the artists of the engraved Bubaline rock art.

While Bubaline rock art does not give prominence to humans, Round Head rock art does give prominence to humans; the difference in human prominence depicted by Bubaline rock artists and Round Head rock artists, as indicative of increasing awareness of the importance and agency of humans, may be viewed as a representational transition in Central Saharan rock art from the Paleolithic period toward the Neolithic period.

=== Hunter-Gatherers ===
Bubaline rock art portrays Paleolithic lifeways. Hunter-gatherers may have created the engraved Large Wild Fauna rock art. Some rock art portrays half-animal and half-human figures or human figures with animal masks. Some rock art also portrays depictions of a sexual nature between men and women. At Oued Djerat, in Algeria, engraved rock art feature masked bowmen with male circumcision and may be a scene involving ritual. In comparison to Pastoral rock art, Round Head rock art and Bubaline rock art portray more women; while Barich (1998) views this as the loss of social status among women, Miller (2008) indicates that, while possibly valid, Pastoral rock art may also portray women differently, and that distinction between depicted genders are not always as clearly shown.

== Legacy ==
After the Green Sahara underwent desertification by 1000 BCE, most of its ancient inhabitants migrated to other areas in Africa, taking along their culture with them; many artistic styles throughout African history may have been influenced by earlier Saharan rock art. The cultural practice of circumcision may have also spread from the Central Sahara, toward the south in Sub-Saharan Africa and toward the east in the region of the Nile.
