= Kel Essuf Period =

Earliest Engraved Anthropomorphic Central Saharan rock art

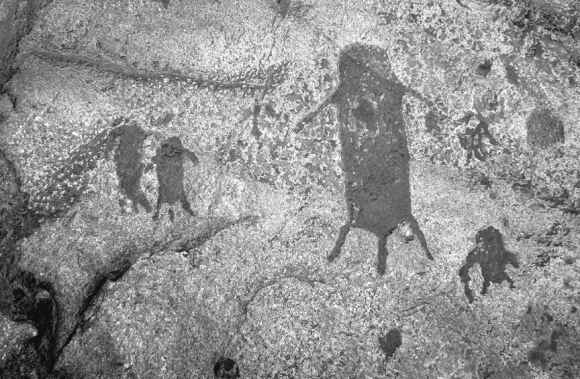
Some Kel Essuf engravings at Iberdjen Wan Tabarakat

Kel Essuf rock art is the earliest form of engraved anthropomorphic Central Saharan rock art, which was produced prior to 9800 BP, at least as early as 12,000 BP amid the late period of the Pleistocene. The Kel Essuf Period is preceded by the Bubaline Period and followed by the Round Head Period. Kel Essuf rock art usually depicts oval-shaped artforms, which possess four short appendages – two upper appendages, or arms, that may have between three and four finger-like digits, and two lower appendages, or legs – as well as an additional appendage, or penile appendage, without finger-like digits, which may be indicative of maleness. Concealed remnants of dismantled furnished flooring are found in 75% of the Central Saharan rockshelters where Kel Essuf rock artforms are found. The furnished flooring in these rockshelters were likely created for the purpose of collecting water and were subsequently dismantled after the earliest Round Head rock art began to be created. The Kel Essuf rock art tradition of engraving may have developed into the monumental Round Head rock art tradition of painting. Round Head rock art bears considerable similarity with traditional Sub-Saharan African cultures.

== Classifications ==
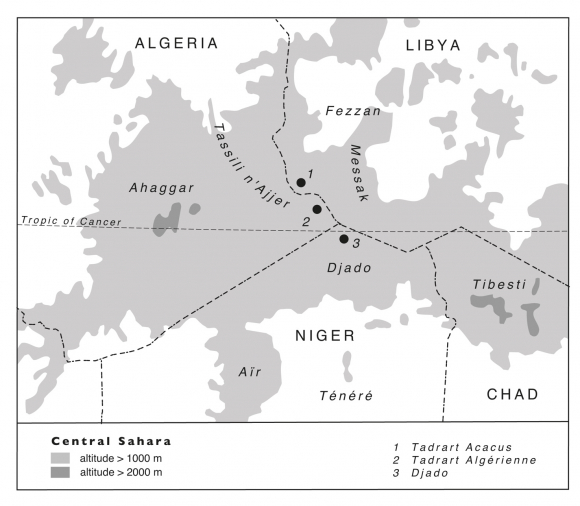
Distribution map of Kel Essuf type engravings in the central Sahara

Rock art is categorized into different groups (e.g., Bubaline, Kel Essuf, Round Heads, Pastoral, Caballine, Cameline), based on a variety of factors (e.g., art method, organisms, motifs, superimposed).

In 5000 BP, buffalo (Bubalus antiquus) in Africa underwent mass extinction; consequently, the engraved stone portrayals of these macroscopic, undomesticated buffalos in unenclosed rock art zones resulted in them being identified as Bubaline. In contrast, located in enclosed rock art zones, there are engraved Kel Essuf ("spirit of dead" in the Tuareg language) art, which portray short-armed, little human artforms with legs and penile appendages.

Human and undomesticated animal (e.g., Barbary sheep, antelope) artforms are usually portrayed, with a variety of details (e.g., dancing, ceremonies, masks, spiritual animal forms), in painted Round Head rock art. Painted Round Head rock art and engraved Kel Essuf rock art usually share the same region and occasionally the same rockshelters in contrast to engraved Bubaline rock art, which rarely appear in rock art zones where painted Round Head rock art is portrayed predominantly.

== Chronology ==
For the rock art of the Sahara, the most contentious among academic debates has remained the topic of chronology. Round Head, Kel Essuf, and Bubaline rock art, as the oldest chronological types, have been regarded as less certain compared to the younger chronological types (e.g., rock art depicting Saharan animals, which could be chronologically approximated to a specific timespan). Consequently, two types of chronologies (i.e., high chronology, low chronology) were developed.

The date for Bubaline rock art was approximated to the late period of the Pleistocene or early period of the Holocene using remnants of clay, manganese, and iron oxide in the dark hued patina. Rock walls were estimated to have developed between 9200 BP and 5500 BP using substances of organic origin found within the depths of the rock walls. The Qurta rock art of prehistoric Egypt, which portray undomesticated animals, has been estimated to a minimum of 15,000 BP; this has been used as an additional consideration for Bubaline rock art dating well before 10,000 BP.

While the Kel Essuf rock art and Bubaline rock art have not been found layered above one another, in addition to the Kel Essuf rock art being found within a dark hued patina, it has been found layered beneath Round Head rock art. Due to the layering and the artistic commonalities between the Kel Essuf rock art and Round Head rock art of the Central Sahara, the engraved Kel Essuf rock art is regarded to be the artistic precursor to the painted Round Head rock art.

Credence to the high chronology is given via decoratively detailed Saharan ceramics dated to 10,726 BP. A spatula and lithic grinding tools with ocher remnants on them, which serves as evidence of painting, were found in an Acacus rockshelter with Round Head rock art. Paint from Round Head rock art in the region (e.g., Acacus) of Libya was also tested and dated to 6379 BP. Altogether, these show continuation of the Round Head rock art tradition well into the Pastoral Period.

Based on the furnished floors purposed for the collection of spring water, the Kel Essuf rock art, which are cultural facies, may date at least as early as 12,000 BP amid the late period of the Pleistocene.

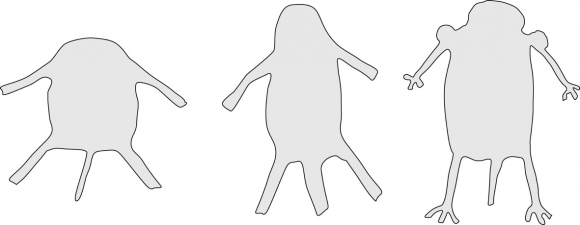
Iberdjen Wan Tabarakat: three examples of Kel Essuf engravings in the same rock shelter

== Climate ==
From 60,000 BP or 40,000 BP to 20,000 BP, the Aterian culture existed. Between 16th to 15th millennium BP, the environment was humid. From 20,000 BP to 13,000 BP, there was a varied climate system. The high elevated regions with mountains were considerably more wet than low elevated regions without mountains, which led to the variation in climate. Regions of high elevation had occurrences of considerable rainfall, to the extent that lakes developed, whereas, regions of low elevation had occurrences of considerable dryness. Amid the late period of the Pleistocene, with its varied climate system, the mountainous environment remained sufficiently humid, which allowed for animal, plant, and human life to be sustained. Amid the Kel Essuf Period, there may have been increasing regional isolation due to adverse climate within the region.

== Origins of the Kel Essuf Rock Art ==
Mori (1967) first hypothesized that Round Head rock art evolved from Kel Essuf rock art in the Acacus region; this hypothesized evolution of one rock art type into another receives support due to Round Head rock art having been superimposed upon Kel Essuf rock art in the Tadrart of Algeria. The superimposed state of Round Head rock art upon Kel Essuf rock art is viewed as showing that Kel Essuf rock art chronologically precedes Round Head rock art and is also perceived as a pattern of development, from simpler detailed Kel Essuf engravings to more complexly detailed (e.g., fingers) Round Head paintings. Mori (1967) has found continued support by Hallier & Hallier (1999) and Streidter et al. (2002–2003).

The striking likenesses between the Kel Essuf and Round Head rock artforms, along with likeness in shape, include the following notable traits: forms shaped like a “half-moon” connected to the shoulder(s), engraved forms shaped like a “half-moon” near “figures”, forms bearing bows and sticks, and horns atop the heads of the Kel Essuf forms that are like the Round Head forms in configuration (e.g., shape, position). Due to the absence of these likenesses in Pastoral rock artforms, these likenesses may be concluded as cultural particularities unique to the hunter-gatherers who created the Kel Essuf and Round Head rock artforms. A cultural particularity unique to the Kel Essuf rock art, in contrast to the Round Head rock art, are penile forms; these penile forms, or additional appendages, may be indicative of maleness, and may be absent from the Round Head rock art due to taboo. Aside this absence, both the Kel Essuf and Round Head rock art are largely composed of male artforms.

Comparative analysis of the rock art from Tassili n’Ajjer and Djado resulted in the conclusion that the Round Head rock art of Djado was the precursor to the Round Head rock art of Tassili n’Ajjer. With the enneris of the mountainous area of Djado as its origin, the creators of the Round Head rock art of Djado migrated, from Djado to Tassili, and, as continuation of the Djado artistic tradition, produced the Round Head rock art of Tassili n’Ajjer.

The "pecked Djado-Roundheads", or Kel Essuf rock art, in the Djado mountains of northern Niger are viewed as having great likeness with the Round Head rock art in the region (e.g., Tadrart, Tassili) of Algeria and to some art in the region (e.g., Acacus) of Libya; hence, this is viewed as showing that the hunting societies who created these rock art were of the same cultural unit and cultural ideology, though having cultural varieties unique to each area.

While the Round Head rock art is found in less abundance in the mountainous regions (e.g., Tadrart, Acacus) of Algeria and Libya, it is found in greatest abundance in the plateau area of Tassili. The precursors for Round Head rock art may have originated in the mountainous northern area (e.g., Adrar Bous, Air) of Niger. These areas are viewed as archaeologically similar (e.g., pottery). Undomesticated flora and animals were used in Epipaleolithic and Mesolithic hunter-gatherer cultures between 10,000 BP and 8000 BP as well as 8800 BP and 7400 BP. Based on the dates acquired for the ceramics in the northern Sahara (8th millennium BP), Tibesti (8949 BP), Libya (8950 BP), and Tin Hanakaten (9420 BP), the core area for the most ancient ceramics of the Sahara may have likely been in the shared region (e.g., Tassili, Air, Adrar Bous) of Niger and Algeria. The Round Head rock artists may have originated in this core area, and may have had a cultural practice of association, via long distance, among other Round Head rock artists. The emergence and expansion of ceramics in the Sahara may be linked with the origin of both the Round Head and Kel Essuf rock art, which occupy rockshelters in the same regions (e.g., Djado, Acacus, Tadrart) as well as have common resemblances (e.g., traits, shapes) with one another.

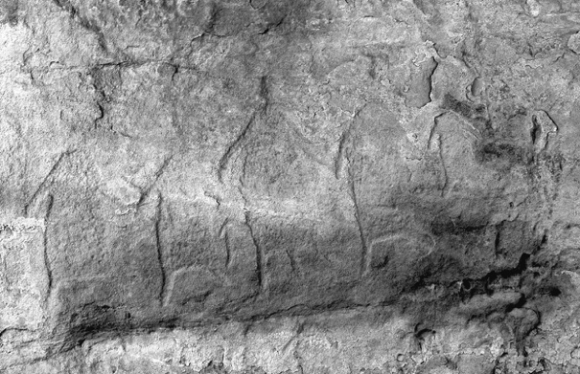
Kel Essuf etchings possibly depicting a family

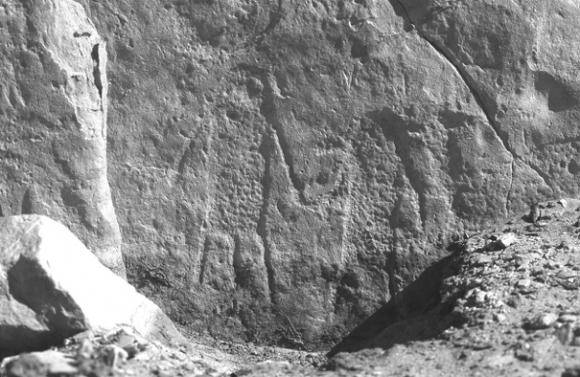
Kel Essuf engravings representing a couple, perhaps the oldest known couple figuration

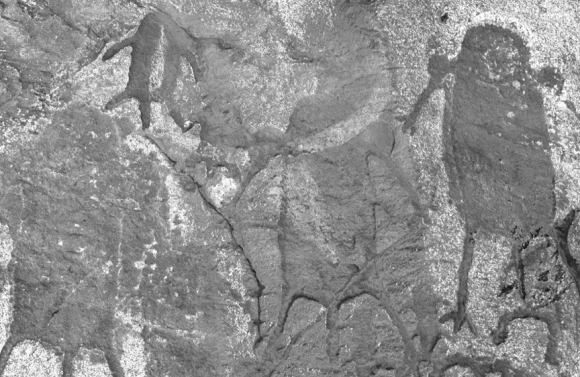
Iberdjen Wan Tabarakat: engravings by Kel Essuf obliterated by paintings by the Round Heads

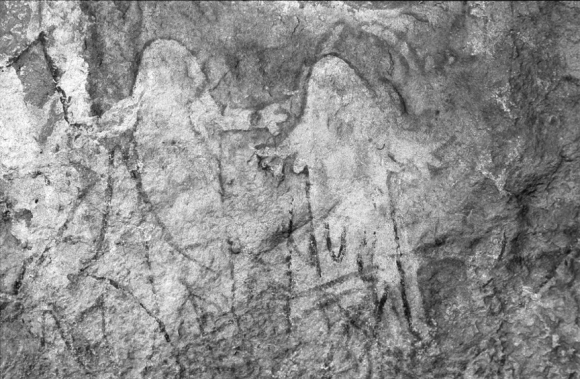
Djado Plateau: example of painting from the Round Heads depicting an anthropomorph very close to the Kel Essuf model

== Kel Essuf Rock Art and Hunter-Gatherers ==
=== Kel Essuf Rock Art ===
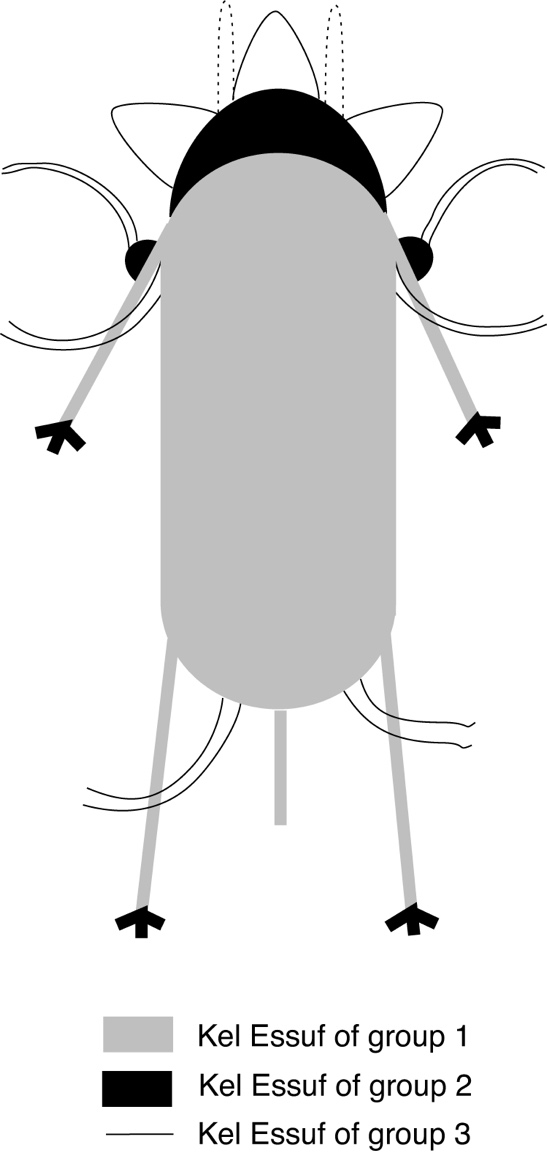
Evolutionary diagram of Kel Essuf engravings

Kel Essuf rock art is the earliest form of engraved anthropomorphic Central Saharan rock art, which was produced prior to 9800 BP. There are twenty archaeological sites depicting more than 300 Kel Essuf rock artforms in the Tadrart of Algeria and a few archaeological sites in the Tadrart of Libya depicting at least twenty Kel Essuf rock artforms. Kel Essuf rock art usually depicts oval-shaped artforms, which possess four short appendages – two upper appendages, or arms, that may have between three and four finger-like digits, and two lower appendages, or legs – as well as an additional appendage, or penile appendage, without finger-like digits, which may be indicative of maleness. More than 90% of Kel Essuf rock artforms bear an additional appendage, which does not possess finger-like digits. The Kel Essuf rock artforms can be divided into three sub-categories. With category one serving as a standardized reference model, the Kel Essuf rock artforms of category two possess appendages on their sides, with semi-disc-shaped aspects that may be interpreted as being shoulders, and three finger-like digits extending from the ends of the two appendages. The Kel Essuf rock artforms of category three possess two appendages on their sides that are curvilinear (two parallel lines that do not close at their ends), an additional appendage without finger-like digits, and a narrowing which is indicative of it being a neck; additionally, this category of artforms may sometimes possess more than two appendages at the region of their “head”, bear decorative curvilinear attributes near their “shoulder” regions, and even bear trace evidence of having previously been painted.

The Kel Essuf rock art tradition of engraving may have developed into the monumental Round Head rock art tradition of painting. The painted Round Head rock art of Aman Sammedni, located in the high rock shelters of the Tadrart region of Algeria, bear close resemblance to the standard engraved Kel Essuf rock art. Painted Round Head rock art and engraved Kel Essuf rock art usually share the same region and occasionally the same rockshelters. Round Head rock art bears considerable similarity with traditional Sub-Saharan African cultures.

=== Hunter-Gatherers ===
Amid an early period of the Holocene, semi-settled Epipaleolithic and Mesolithic hunters, who created a refined material culture (e.g., stone tools, decorated pottery) as early as 10,000 BP, also created the engraved Kel Essuf and painted Round Head rock art styles located in the region (e.g., some in the Acacus, some in the Tadrart) of Libya, in the region (e.g., some in the Tadrart, most abundant in Tassili n'Ajjer) of Algeria, in the region (e.g., Djado) of Nigeria, and the region (e.g., Djado) of Niger.

Concealed remnants of dismantled furnished flooring are found in 75% of the Central Saharan rockshelters where Kel Essuf rock artforms are found. The furnished flooring in these rockshelters were likely created for the purpose of collecting water and were subsequently dismantled after the earliest Round Head rock art began to be created. Based on these furnished floors purposed for the collection of spring water, the Kel Essuf rock art, which are cultural facies, may date at least as early as 12,000 BP amid the late period of the Pleistocene. Given the occurrences of furnished flooring for collecting water and production of engraved Kel Essuf rock art, these rockshelters may have been inhabited during periods of decreased availability of local water sources. Consequently, there may have been increasing regional isolation due to adverse climate within the region.
