= Circumcision in Africa =

Cultural practice in Africa

Circumcision in Africa, and the rites of initiation in Africa, as well as "the frequent resemblance between details of ceremonial procedure in areas thousands of kilometres apart, indicate that the circumcision ritual has an old tradition behind it and in its present form is the result of a long process of development."

== Cultural background ==
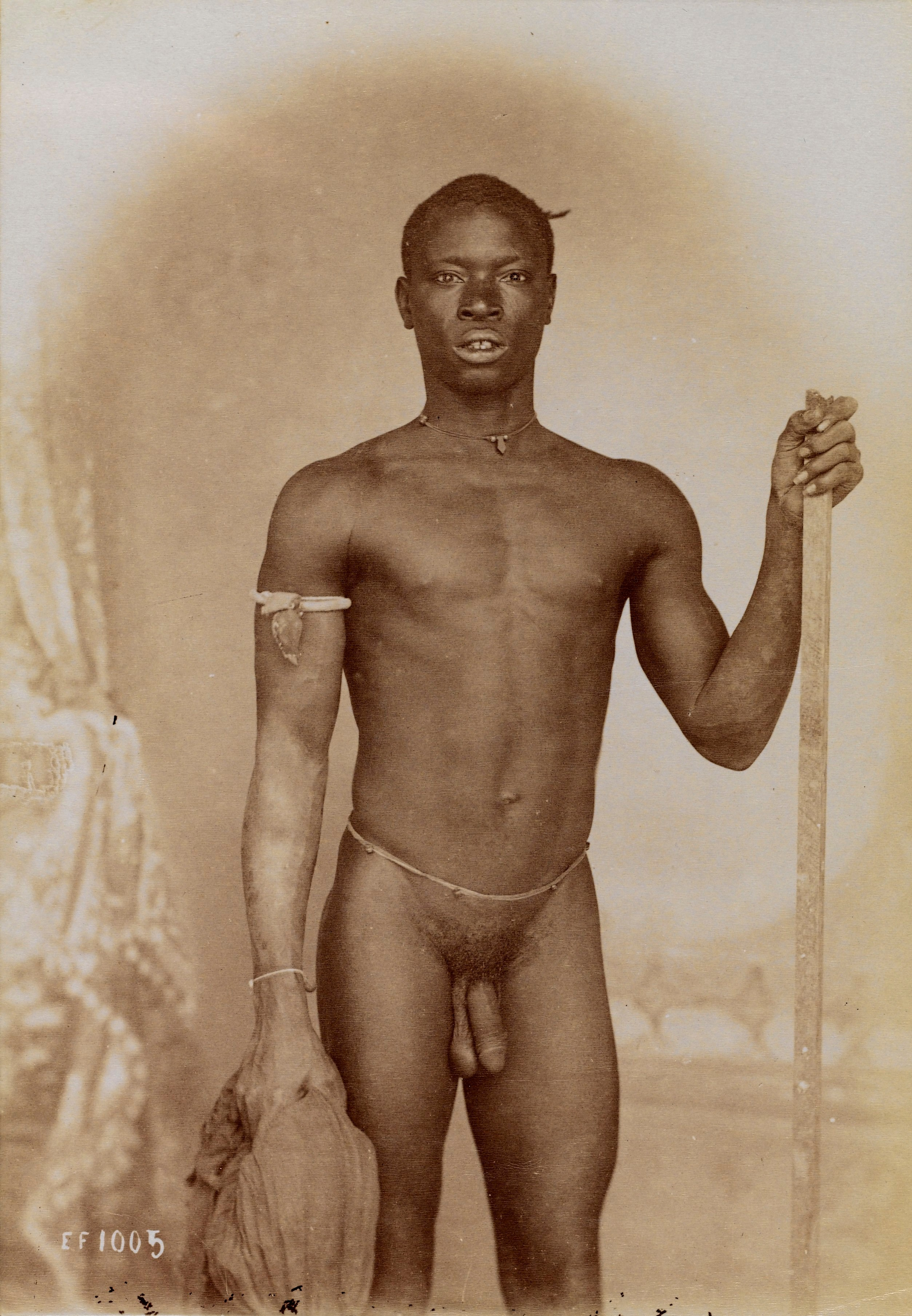
A young African man who was circumcised, c. 1900

Certain African cultural groups, such as the Yoruba and the Igbo of Nigeria, customarily circumcise their infant sons. Amongst the Serer ethnoreligious group of the Senegambia region, the Ndut initiation rite holds Serer religious, cultural, and educational significance. The procedure is also practiced by some cultural groups or individual family lines in Sudan, Democratic Republic of the Congo, Uganda and in southern Africa. For some of these groups, circumcision appears to be purely cultural, done with no particular religious significance or intention to distinguish members of a group. For others, circumcision might be done for purification, or it may be interpreted as a mark of subjugation. Among these groups, even when circumcision is done for reasons of tradition, it is often done in hospitals.

The Xhosa community practice circumcision as a sacrifice. In doing so, young boys will announce to their family members when they are ready for circumcision by singing. The sacrifice is the blood spilt during the initiation procedure. Young boys will be considered an "outsiders" unless they undergo circumcision. It is not clear how many deaths and injuries result from non-clinical circumcisions.

== History ==
=== North Africa ===
==== Algeria ====
At Oued Djerat, in Algeria, engraved rock art with masked bowmen, which feature male circumcision and may be a scene involving ritual, have been dated to earlier than 6000 BP amid the Bubaline Period; more specifically, while possibly dating much earlier than 10,000 BP, rock art walls from the Bubaline Period have been dated between 9200 BP and 5500 BP. The cultural practice of circumcision may have spread from the Central Sahara, toward the south in Sub-Saharan Africa and toward the east in the region of the Nile.

==== Egypt ====
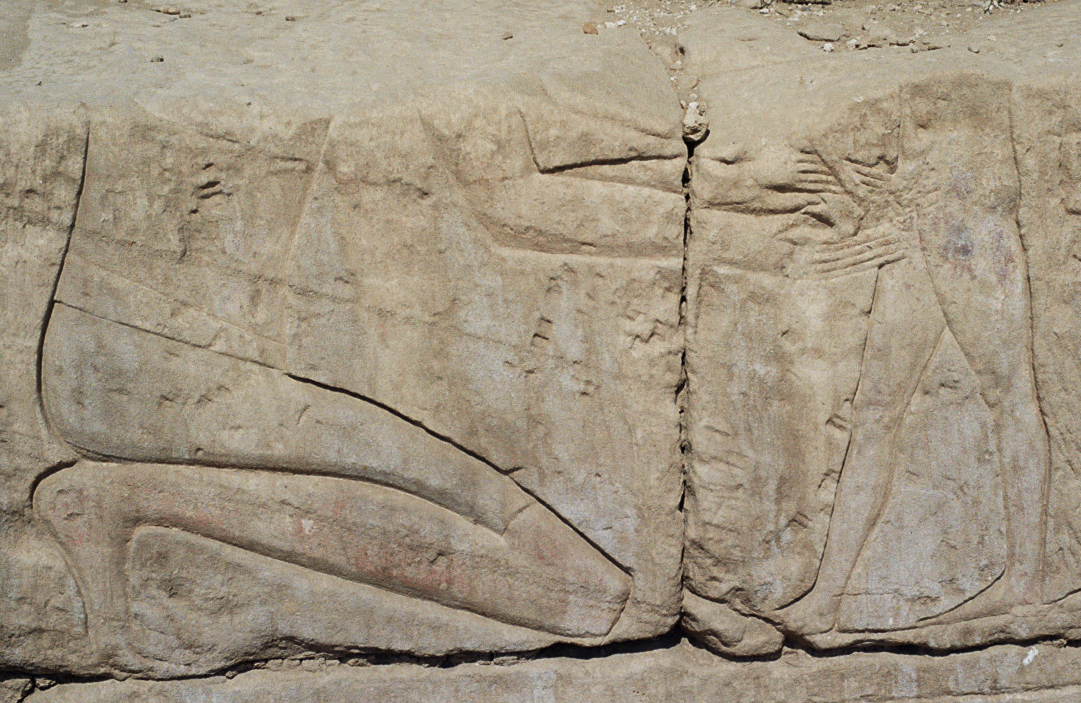
Ancient Egyptian carved scene of circumcision, from the inner northern wall of the Temple of Khonspekhrod at the Precinct of Mut, Luxor, Egypt. Eighteenth dynasty, Amenhotep III, c. 1360 BCE.

Based on engraved evidence found on walls and evidence from mummies, circumcision has been dated to at least as early as 6000 BCE in ancient Egypt.

Ancient Egyptian mummies, which have been dated as early as 4000 BCE, show evidence of having undergone circumcision.

At the mastaba of Ankhmahor in Saqqara, an engraved wall provides an account of Uha, dated to the 23rd century BCE, which indicates that he and others underwent male circumcision.

Herodotus (5th century BCE) indicated that the ancient Egyptians, at-large, practiced circumcision; he also indicated that ancient Ethiopians practiced circumcision.

Xanthus of Lydia (5th century BCE) indicated that female circumcision was practiced among the ancient Egyptians.

Agatharchides of Cnidus (2nd century BCE) indicated that "troglodyte" ethnic groups practiced circumcision; these groups may have resided along the African coast of the Red Sea in southern Egypt or near the Gulf of Zula in present-day Eritrea; while most of these groups practiced a form of circumcision that involved partial excision, the ethnic group, identified by Agatharchides as the "Colobi" ("the mutilated"), were indicated to have practiced a form of circumcision that involved total excision.

A papyrus, which was part of the Serapeum's Ptolemaios archive at Memphis and has been dated to 163 BCE, indicated that an ancient Egyptian girl, Tathemis, was scheduled to undergo female circumcision.

Philo of Alexandria (1st century BCE) indicated that the ancient Egyptians practiced circumcision.

Between 60 BCE and 56 BCE, Diodorus Siculus indicated that female circumcision was a common custom in ancient Egypt.

Between 29 BCE and 26 BCE, Strabo indicated that the ancient Egyptians practiced circumcision.

Galen of Pergamum (2nd century CE) indicated that female circumcision was practiced among the ancient Egyptians.

Soranus of Ephesus (2nd century CE) indicated that female circumcision was practiced among the ancient Egyptians.

Aëtius of Amida (5th century CE) indicated that female circumcision was practiced among the ancient Egyptians.

Leo Africanus (16th century CE) indicated female circumcision was practiced among Egyptians.

=== West Africa ===
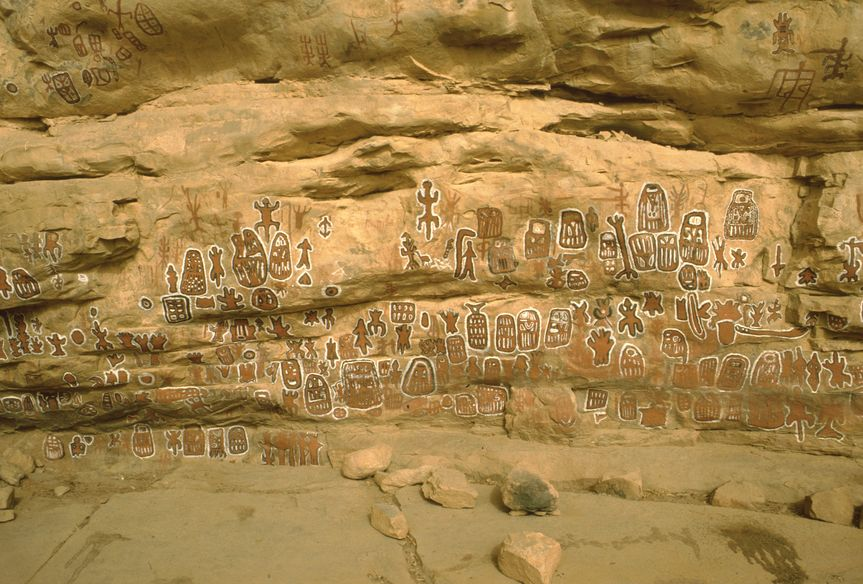
Rock paintings at the "Rock of Circumcision" (Rocca della circoncisione), Sangò, Mali, dating from the 13th century or earlier.

==== Senegambia region ====
Amongst the Serer ethnoreligious group of Senegal, Gambia, Mauritania, and Guinea-Bissau, the Ndut holds Serer religious, cultural, and educational significance. It is in classical Ndut teachings that many aspects of Serer ancient history, Serer cosmogony - including the history and mysteries of the universe are taught.

==== Sierra Leone ====
The Nomoli figurines, which were created by the Mende people in Sierra Leone and depict male circumcised genitalia, have been dated between the 7th century CE and the 8th century CE.

=== Central Africa ===
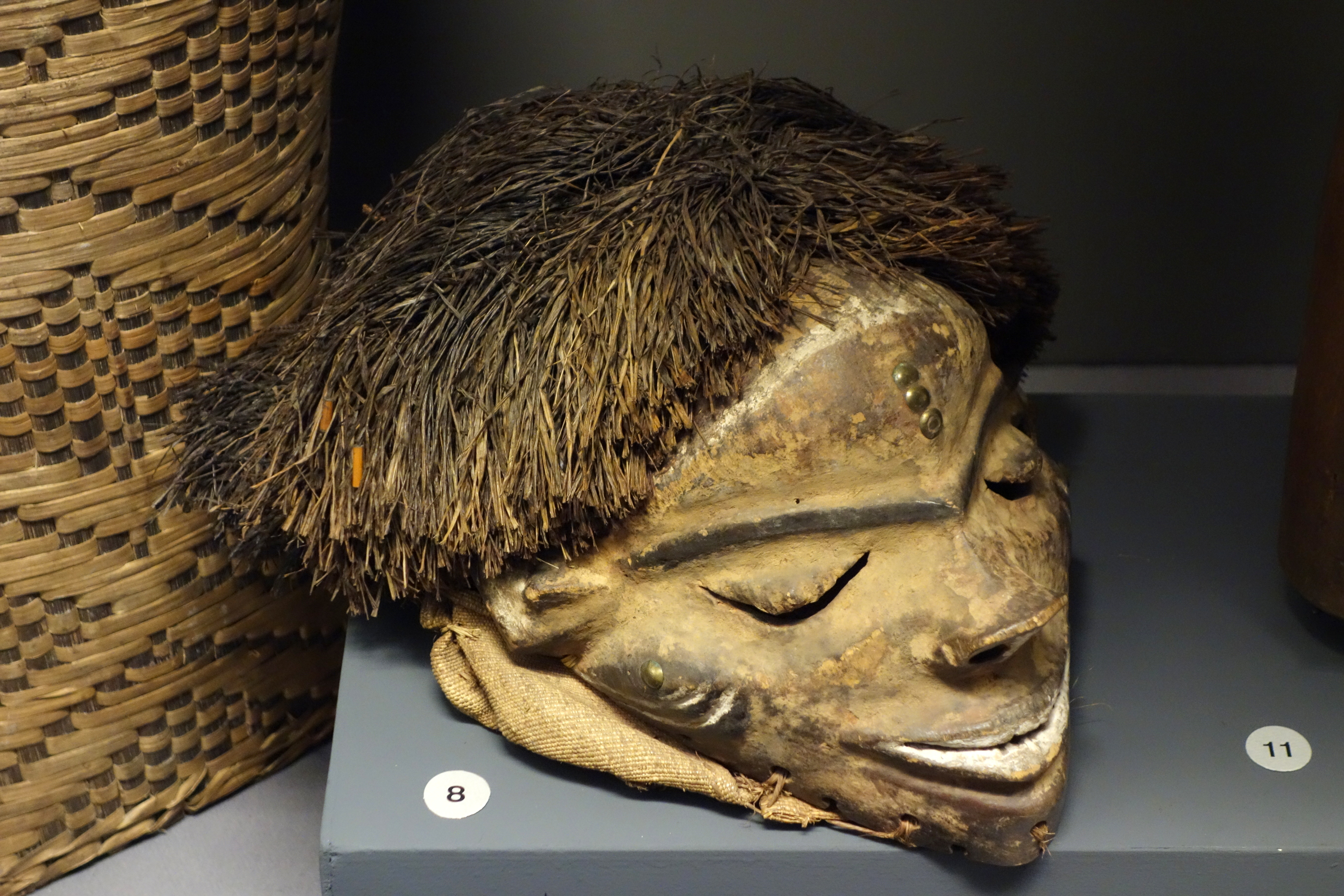
Mbuya mask associated with circumcision initiation rites, Pende people, Democratic Republic of Congo. Royal Museum for Central Africa, Tervuren, Belgium. Public domain.

Prior to 300 CE, male circumcision, which is a cultural practice that is part of male initiations, is estimated to have existed in Africa for more than 9000 years. By 300 CE, male initiation and male circumcision had ceased among some matrilineal Bantu-speaking peoples in East Africa and Central Africa.

=== East Africa ===
Prior to 300 CE, male circumcision, which is a cultural practice that is part of male initiations, is estimated to have existed in Africa for more than 9000 years. By 300 CE, male initiation and male circumcision had ceased among some matrilineal Bantu-speaking peoples in East Africa and Central Africa.

==== Eritrea ====
Agatharchides of Cnidus (2nd century BCE) indicated that "troglodyte" ethnic groups practiced circumcision; these groups may have resided along the African coast of the Red Sea in southern Egypt or near the Gulf of Zula in present-day Eritrea; while most of these groups practiced a form of circumcision that involved partial excision, the ethnic group, identified by Agatharchides as the "Colobi" ("the mutilated"), were indicated to have practiced a form of circumcision that involved total excision.

=== Southern Africa ===
==== South Africa ====
Among the Zulu people of South Africa, male circumcision was historically seen as a rite of passage to manhood. However, beginning in the 19th century CE, Shaka, a Zulu king, prohibited male circumcision due to concerns that young circumcised men might be less interested in joining as warriors in the military force he was amassing and uniting in the region of southern Africa and might be more interested in seeking opportunities for having sex. In 2010, the Zulu King Goodwill Zwelithini re-established a circumcision program to combat HIV/AIDS.

== Percentage of circumcision per country ==
Circumcision is prevalent among 92% of men in North Africa and around 62% in Sub-Saharan Africa. In western and northern parts of Africa it is mainly performed for religious reasons, whereas in southern parts of Africa it rarely performed in neonates, instead being a rite of passage into manhood.

Studies evaluating the complications due to traditional male circumcision have found rates varying from 35% (Kenya) to 48% (South Africa). Infection, delayed wound healing, glans amputation and injury, bleeding, loss of penile sensitivity, excessive removal of foreskin, and death are the major complications reported.

In some African and Eastern Christian denominations male circumcision is an integral or established practice, and require that their male members undergo circumcision. Circumcision is near-universal among Coptic Christians, Ethiopian Orthodox and Eritrean Orthodox, and they practice circumcision as a rite of passage.

=== North Africa ===
==== Algeria ====
The male child circumcision rate in Algeria is around 97.9%.

==== Egypt ====
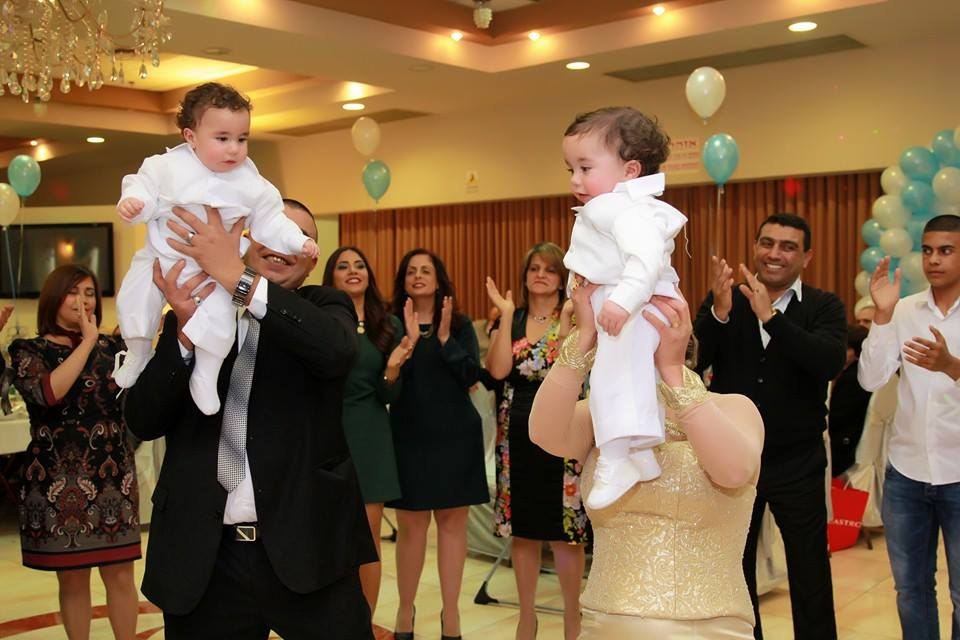
Coptic Children wearing traditional circumcision costumes

The male child circumcision rate in Egypt is around 94%.

Circumcision is near-universal among Coptic Christians, and they practice circumcision as a rite of passage.

==== Libya ====
The male circumcision rate in Libya is estimated to be 96.6%.

==== Morocco ====
The male circumcision rate in Morocco is estimated to be 99.9%.

Historically, circumcision in Morocco was performed by barbers, but is now done by medical surgeons. The circumcision of Prince Moulay Hassan, almost two years old at the time, prompted thousands of other young boys to be circumcised. The procedure is considered "purification" (t'hara) by Muslims.

==== Tunisia ====
The male child circumcision rate in Tunisia is around 99.8%.

==== Western Sahara ====
The male circumcision rate in Western Sahara is estimated to be 99.6%.

=== West Africa ===
==== Benin ====
The male circumcision rate in Benin is estimated to be 92.9%.

==== Burkina Faso ====
The male circumcision rate in Burkina Faso is estimated to be 88.3%.

==== Gambia ====
The male circumcision rate in The Gambia is estimated to be 94.5%.

==== Ghana ====
The male child circumcision rate in Ghana is around 95%, with operations performed in hospitals and clinics. However, there are some variations in the country. For example, circumcision is less common in Ghana's Upper West Region, at 68%.

==== Guinea ====
The male circumcision rate in Guinea is estimated to be 84.2%.

==== Guinea-Bissau ====
The male circumcision rate in Guinea-Bissau is estimated to be 93.3%.

==== Ivory Coast ====
The male circumcision rate in Ivory Coast is around 95%, with operations conducted in hospitals and health clinics.

==== Liberia ====
Almost all men (98 percent) in Liberia are circumcised, with operations carried out in hospitals and health clinics.

==== Mali ====
The male circumcision rate in Mali is estimated to be 86%.

==== Mauritania ====
The male circumcision rate in Mauritania is estimated to be 99.2%.

==== Niger ====
The male circumcision rate in Niger is estimated to be 95.5%.

==== Nigeria ====
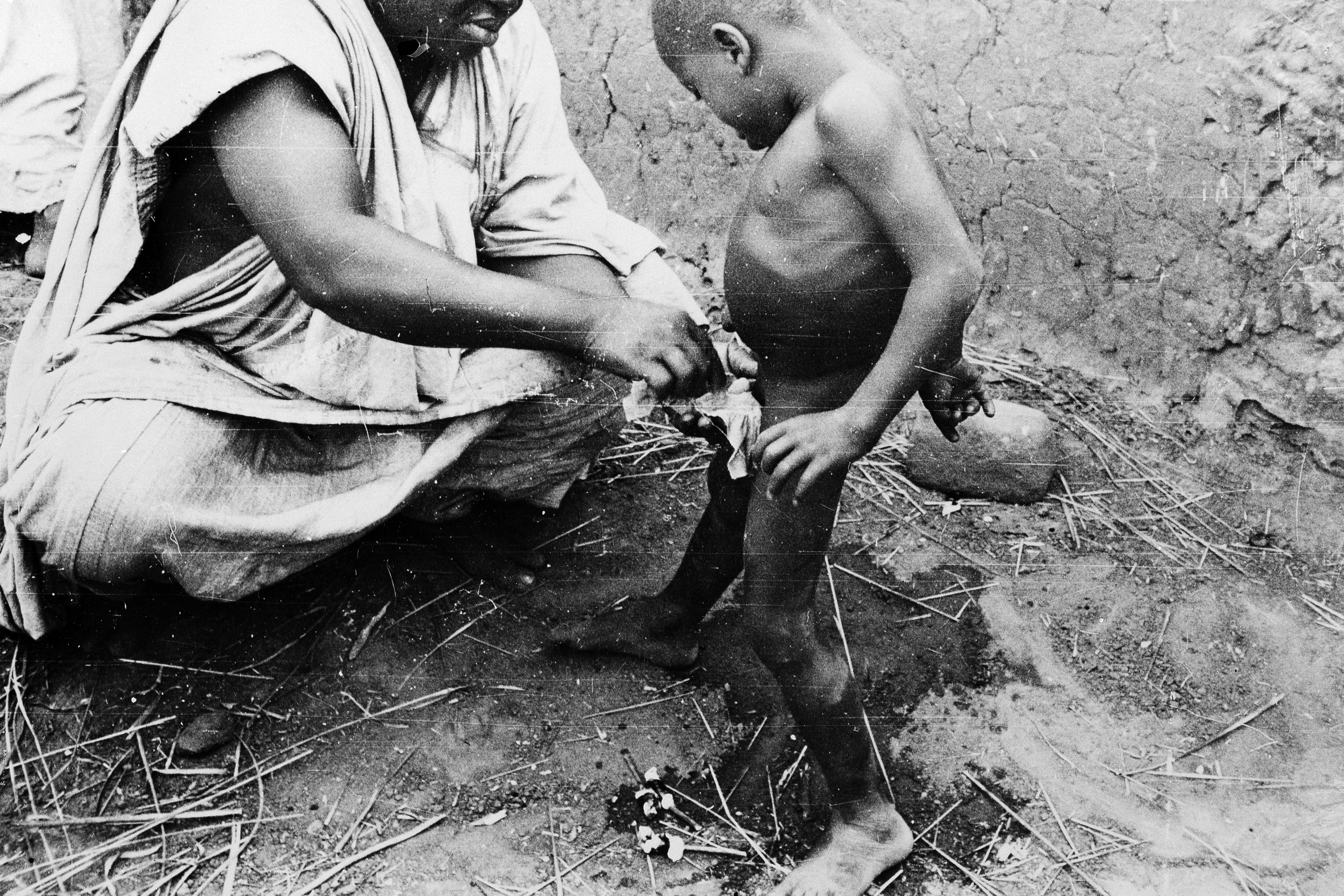
A circumcision operation among the Nupe people

The male circumcision rate in Nigeria is estimated to be 98.9%.

Nigerian culture favours circumcising baby boys when they are aged between eight and forty days. Neonatal (child) circumcision is performed on more than 85% of boys in Nigeria, Western Africa, and the majority of procedures are done by nurses (56%) and doctors (35%), with a small proportion (9%) performed by traditional practitioners (2). The reasons are cultural and religious.

==== Senegal ====
The male circumcision rate in Senegal is estimated to be 93.5%.

==== Sierra Leone ====
The male circumcision rate in Sierra Leone, estimated in 2016, is around 96.1%, with operations carried out in hospitals and health clinics.

==== Togo ====
The male circumcision rate in Togo is estimated to be 95.2%.

=== Central Africa ===
==== Cameroon ====
The male child circumcision rate in Cameroon is around 90%, in common with other countries of West and North Africa, with operations performed in hospitals and clinics.

==== Central African Republic ====
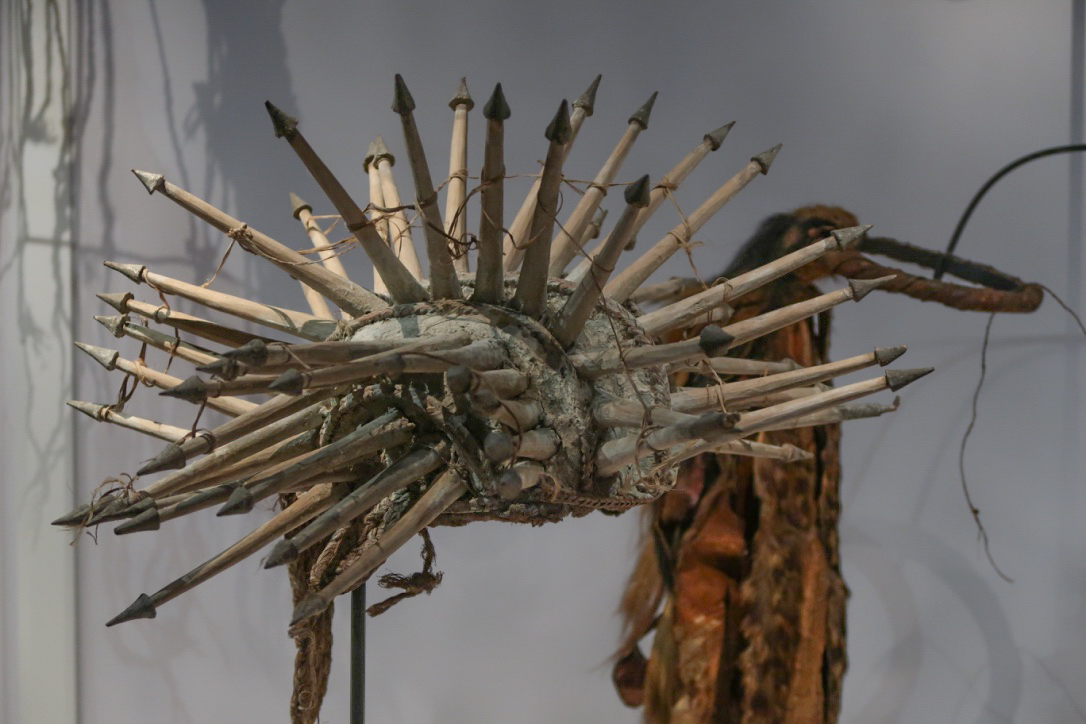
Banda-Dakpa Circumcision Headdress (Ganza), Central African Republic, 20th century

The male circumcision rate in the Central African Republic is estimated to be 63%.

==== Chad ====
The male circumcision rate in Chad is estimated to be 73.5%.

==== Democratic Republic of Congo ====
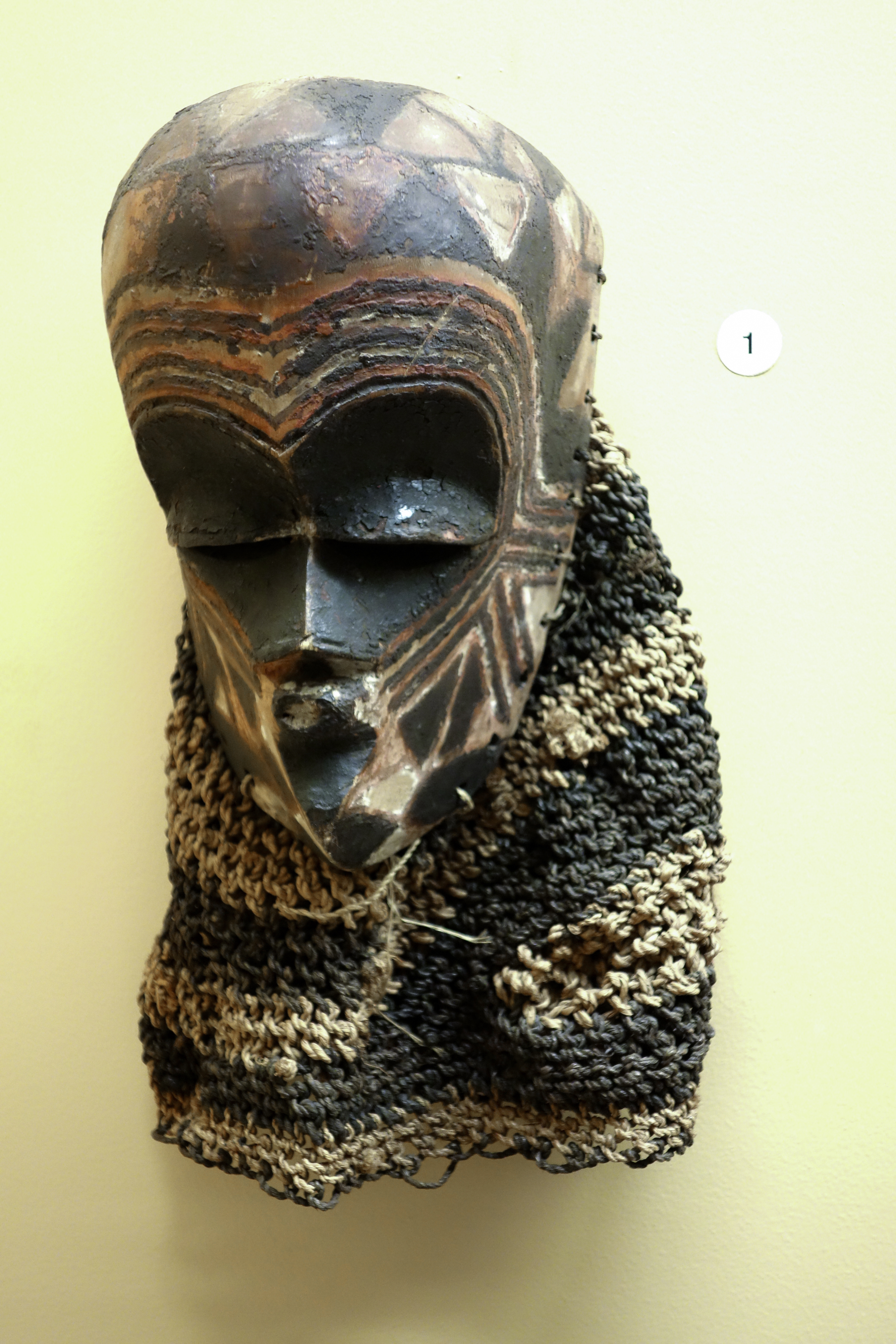
Mask (Nkota) used in Mukanda circumcision ritual of the Lulua people

The male circumcision rate in the Democratic Republic of the Congo is estimated to be 97.2%.

==== Equatorial Guinea ====
The male circumcision rate in Equatorial Guinea is estimated to be 87%.

==== Gabon ====
The male circumcision rate in Gabon is estimated to be 99.9%.

==== Rwanda ====
The male circumcision rate in Rwanda is estimated to be 13.3%.

Rwanda previously had a lower rate of circumcision, similar to that of South Africa. In both nations, a "safe" PrePex device has been introduced, which claims to involve no pain or bleeding. The Government of Rwanda aims to combat HIV. However, complications have arisen after some circumcisions, including fatalities. The Rwandan Ministry of Health denies that these deaths resulted from the circumcision procedures.

==== Republic of Congo ====
The male circumcision rate in the Republic of the Congo is estimated to be 70%.

==== South Sudan ====
The male circumcision rate in the newly established nation state of South Sudan is estimated to be 23.6%.

Agar Dinka do not circumcise.

=== East Africa ===
Bantu circumcisions have been declining.

The Luo do not circumcise.

==== Burundi ====
The male circumcision rate in Burundi is estimated to be 61.7%.

==== Djibouti ====
The male circumcision rate in Djibouti is estimated to be 96.5%.

==== Ethiopia ====
The male circumcision rate in Ethiopia is estimated to be 92.2%.

The Ethiopian Orthodox Church calls for circumcision, with near-universal prevalence among Orthodox men in Ethiopia.

==== Eritrea ====
The male circumcision rate in Eritrea is estimated to be 97.2%.

Eritrean Orthodox practice circumcision as a rite of passage, and they circumcise their sons "anywhere from the first week of life to the first few years".

==== Kenya ====
The male circumcision rate in Kenya is around 84%, with operations performed in hospitals and clinics.

In traditional circumcisions the same knife is often used for many initiates. This is thought to contribute to the spread of HIV, the main reason parents from communities such as the Kikuyu do the actual procedure in hospitals, though other communities still retain the same cultural elements.

In addition to traditional circumcision, the men of Africa enjoyed "benefits" such as young men became members of the warrior class, and were free to date and marry. The graduates became a fraternity which served together, and continued to have mutual obligation to each other for life.

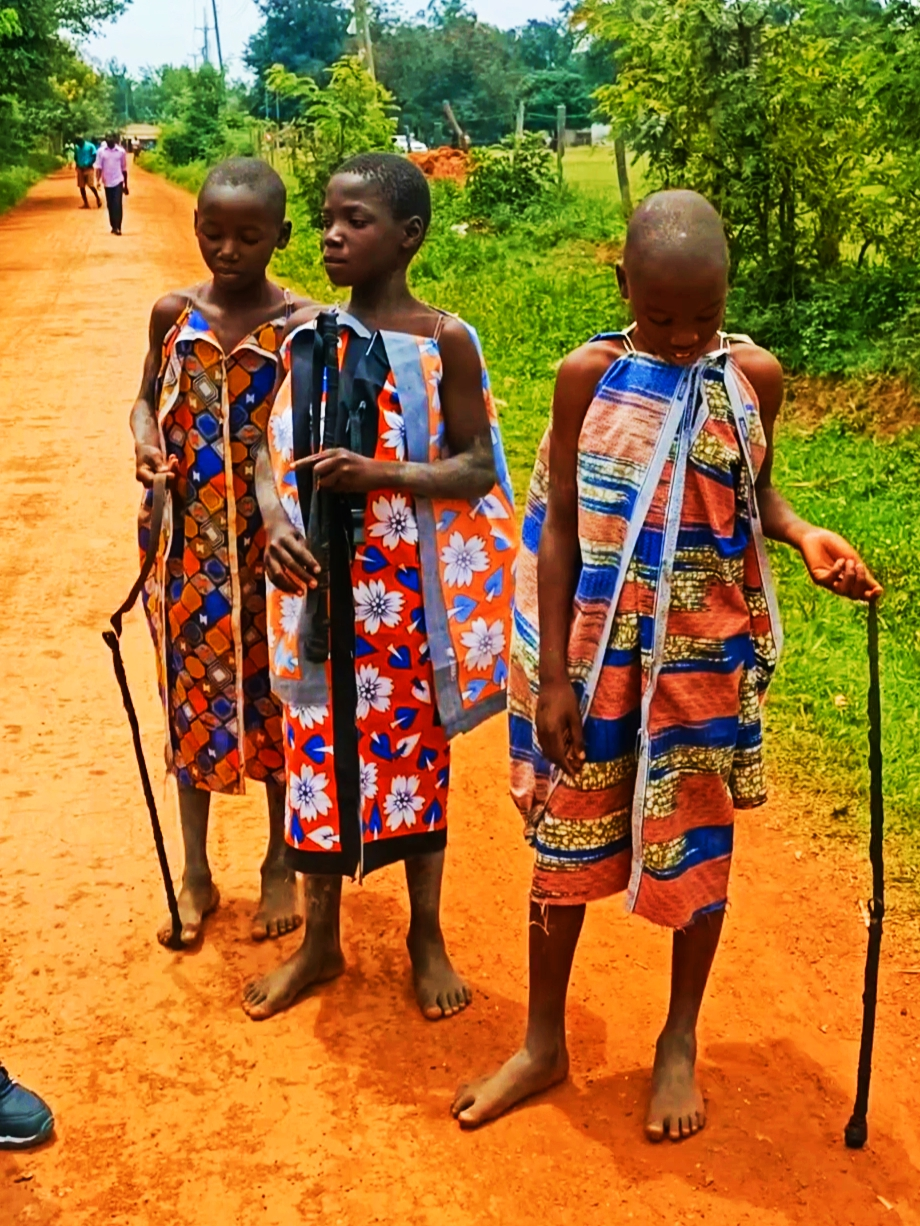
Newly initiated boys into Bukusu circumcision age group in Kenya

In the modern context in East Africa, the physical element of male circumcision remains (in the societies that have historically practiced it) but without most of the other accompanying rites, context, and programs. For many, the operation is now performed in private on one individual, in a hospital or doctor's office. Anesthesia is often used in such settings. There are tribes, however, that do not accept this modernized practice. They insist on circumcision in a group ceremony, and a test of courage at the banks of a river. This more traditional approach is common amongst the Meru and the Kisii tribes of Kenya. One boy in Meru County, Kenya was assaulted by other boys because they wanted him to be circumcised in a traditional ceremony as opposed to in a hospital. Amongst the Gikuyu (Kikuyu) people of Kenya, Embu people of Kenya and the Maasai people of Kenya and Tanzania, male circumcision has historically been the graduation element of an educational program which taught tribal beliefs, practices, culture, religion and history to youth who were on the verge of becoming full-fledged members of society. The circumcision ceremony was very public, and required a display of courage under the knife in order to maintain the honor and prestige of the young man and his family. The only form of anesthesia was a bath in the cold morning waters of a river, which tended to numb the senses to a minor degree. The youths being circumcised were required to maintain a stoic expression and not to flinch from the pain.

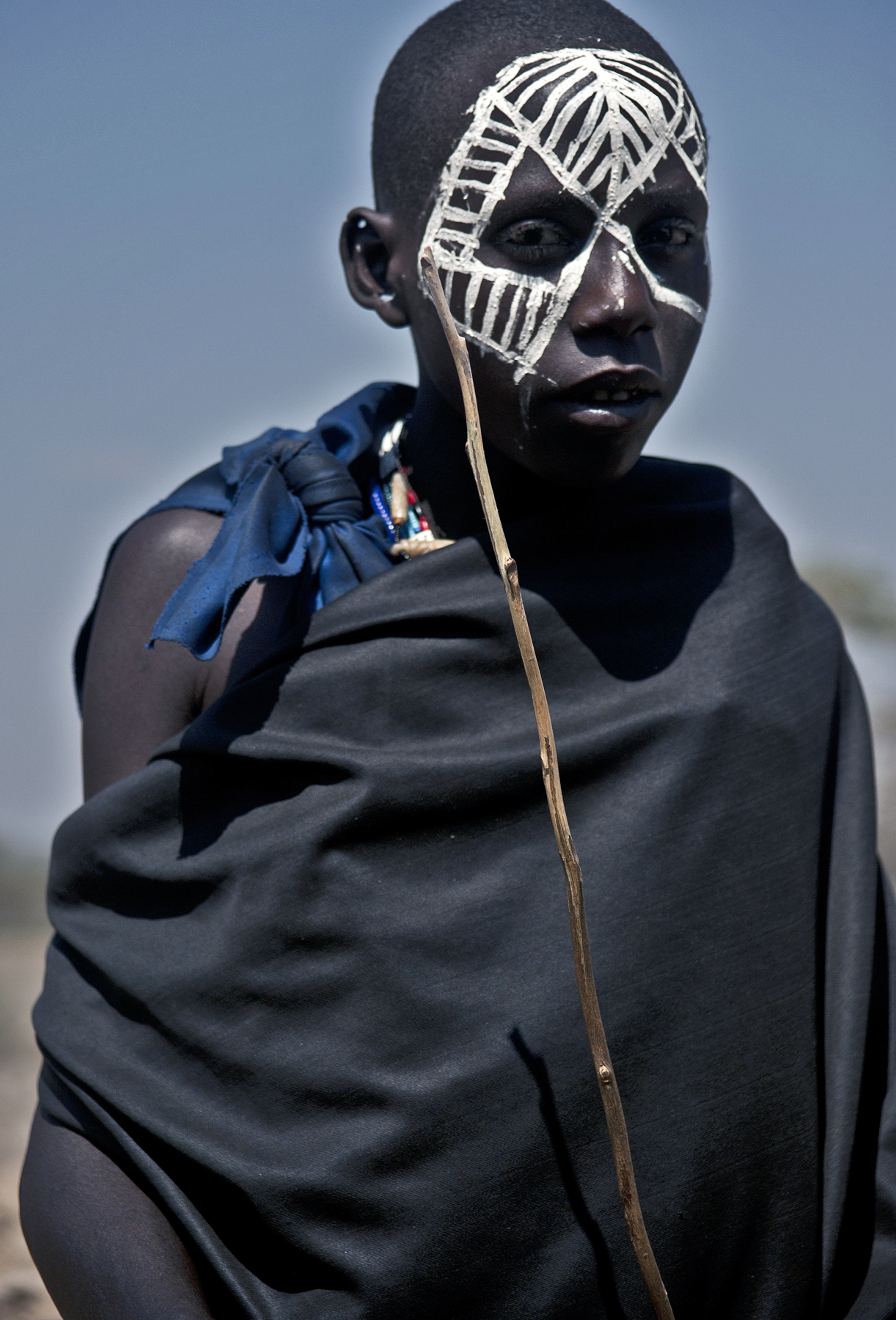
Young Maasai men in the post-circumcision initiation period, wearing the black cloaks and facial paint traditional to the healing phase, Kenya or Tanzania.

Despite the loss of the rites and ceremonies that accompanied male circumcision in the past, the physical operation remains crucial to personal identity and pride, and acceptance in society. Uncircumcised men in these communities risk being "outed", and subjected to ridicule as "boys". There have been many cases of forced circumcision of men from such communities who are discovered to have escaped the ritual. Those who do not want to be circumcised seek refuge in Kenya's police stations.

Traditional circumcision is practiced among the Bukusu people of Kenya. Ceremonies usually take place in August. They involve the use of mud. This is used to prevent excessive bleeding after the cut, to prevent wincing, and to commemorate a traditional legend.

The Turkana tribe do not perform ritual circumcision.

==== Madagascar ====
The male circumcision rate in the island nation of Madagascar is estimated to be 94.7%.

==== Mauritius ====
The male circumcision rate in the island nation of Mauritius is estimated to be 16.6%.

==== Somalia ====
The male circumcision rate in Somalia is estimated to be 93.5%.

==== Tanzania ====
The male circumcision rate in Tanzania is estimated to be 72%.

In 2015, the Johns Hopkins Program for International Education in Gynecology and Obstetrics, a non profit health association affiliated with Johns Hopkins University, completed a voluntary circumcision project, covering three traditionally non-circumcising Tanzanian regions, Iringa, Njombe and Tabora, which circumcised 400,000 men. It was done in collaboration with the National AIDS Control Programme. They offered the services in 500 health facilities across the three regions.

Mobile health clinics have been launched, funded by USAID, to offer circumcision and sexual health advice to adult men.

Efforts are being made to scale up circumcision where there is low prevalence of circumcision; the areas cited are: Iringa, Tabora, Mbeya, Songwe, Rukwa, Katavi, Shinyanga, Simiyu, Mwanza, Geita, Kagera and Musoma. Following this, Singida, Kigoma, Mara and Morogoro will also see efforts to scale up circumcision

==== Uganda ====
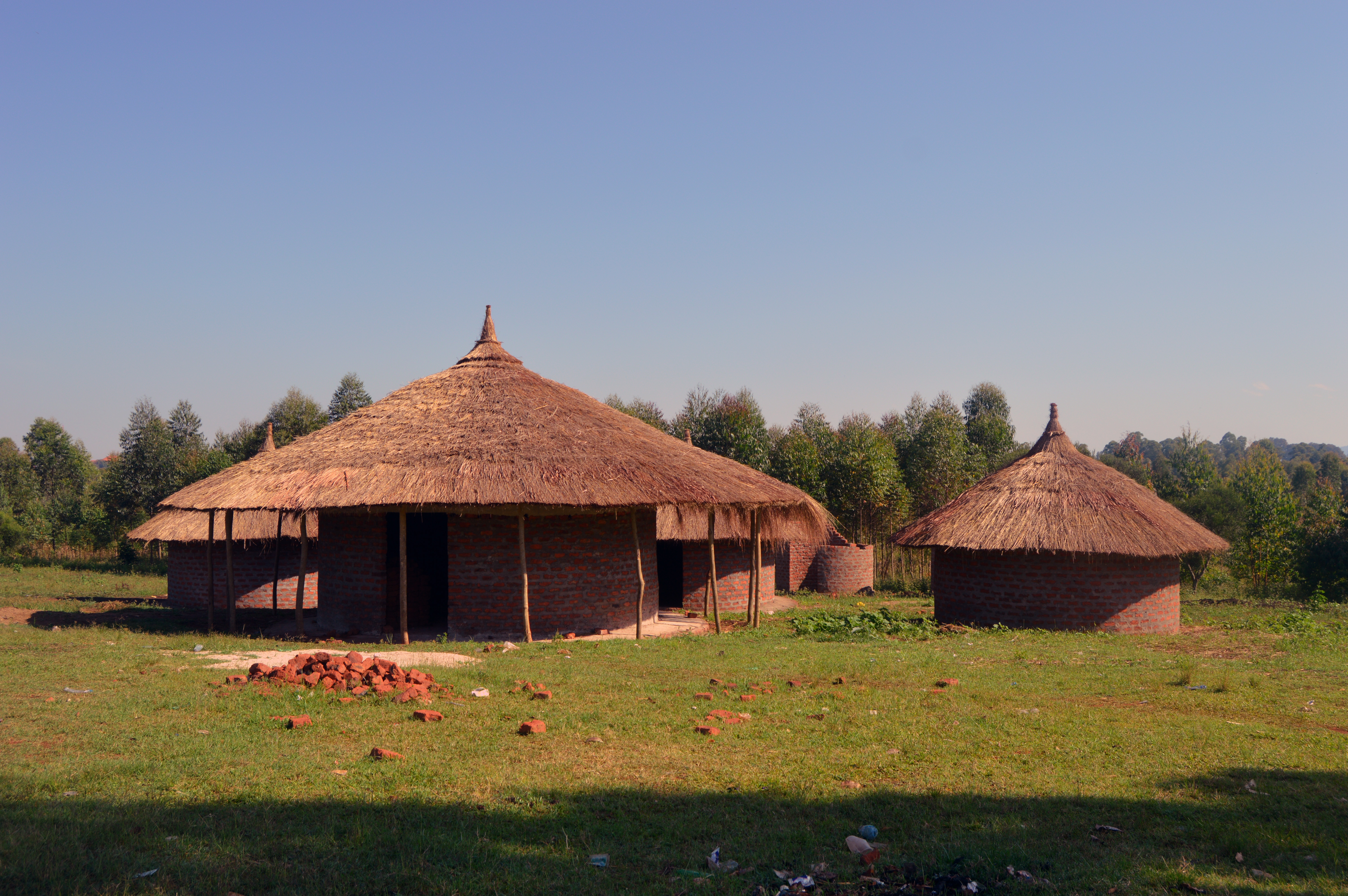
Located in Bunghoko Mbale in Uganda, the official site for the opening ceremonies for circumcision.

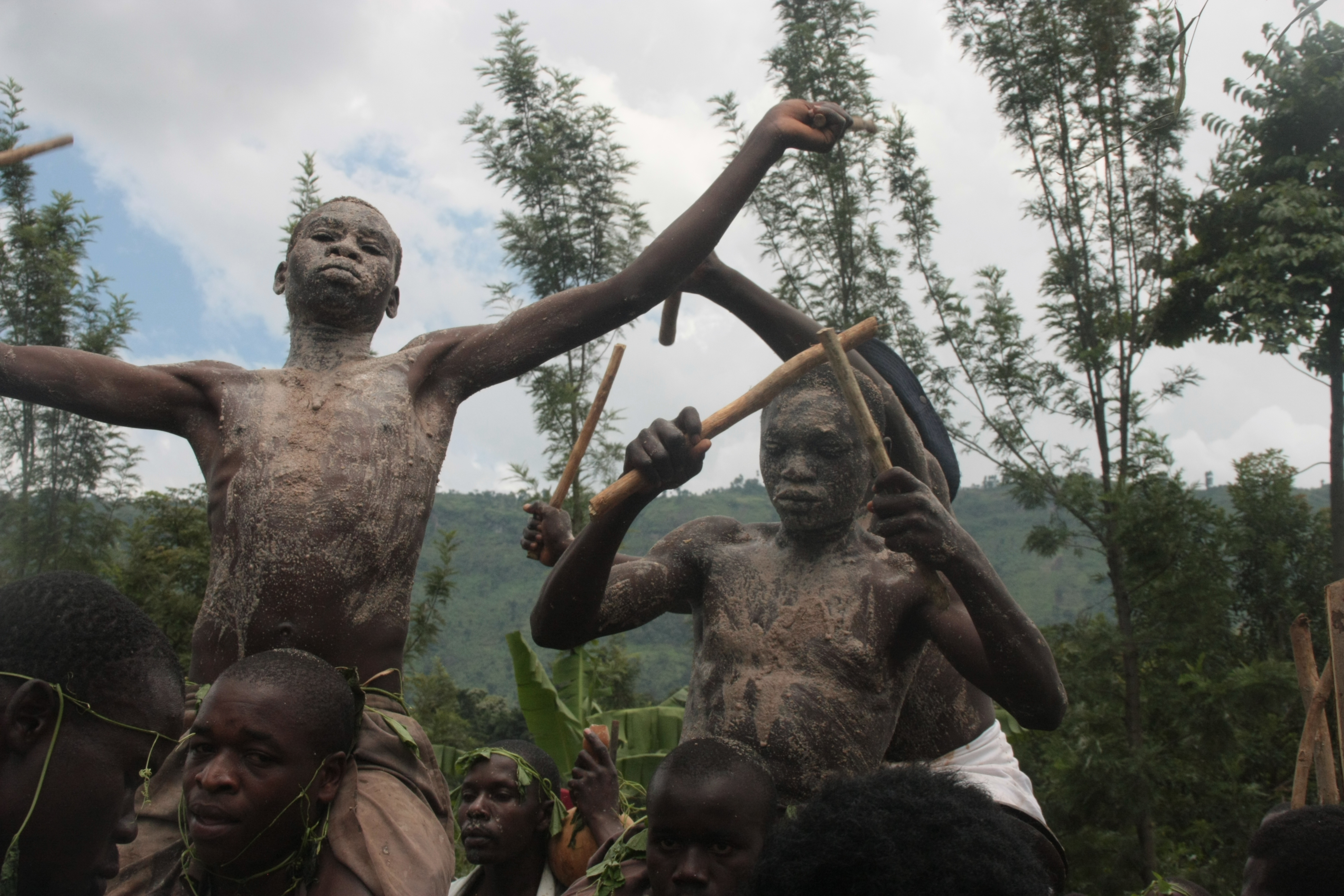
Boys prepared for circumcision initiation, their bodies and faces coated with a ceremonial fermented drink, Buganda region, Uganda.

The male circumcision rate in Uganda is estimated to be 26.7%.

In Uganda, circumcision is performed for religious, cultural, and medical reasons. Medical related circumcision is mainly to reduce the transmission of human immunodeficiency virus and sexually transmitted illnesses. It is performed by non-physicians, including for infants and neonates.

In Uganda, Sebei, Bagisu, Baamba, and Bakonzo ethnic groups practice TMC. As of 2012, 70% of Ugandan men are not circumcised. Around 10% of Ugandan men belong to groups which practice traditional male circumcision. The age range for eastern Ugandan candidates is relatively older (14–18 years) than that of western Uganda (2–15 years). The cost of TMC varies from UGX 5,000 to 40,000, or approximately US$2.00 to 16.00 (Uganda GDP per capita is US$1,300.00). The candidate's parents are responsible for the payment, although the price is negotiable and depends on the family's financial ability. Those who undertake a hospital circumcision rather than a traditional circumcision are said to be shunned by their community.

The Gisu people of Uganda are closely related to the Bukusu and also practice circumcision. In Uganda, a circumcision ceremony is called Imbalu.

=== Southern Africa ===
Bantu circumcisions have been declining.

==== Angola ====
The male circumcision rate in Angola is estimated to be 57.5%.

==== Botswana ====
The male circumcision rate in Botswana is estimated to be 15.1%.

==== Comoros ====
The male circumcision rate in the island nation of The Comoros is estimated to be 99.4%.

==== Eswatini ====
The male circumcision rate in Eswatini is estimated to be 8.2%.

==== Lesotho ====
The male circumcision rate in Lesotho is estimated to be 52%.

==== Malawi ====
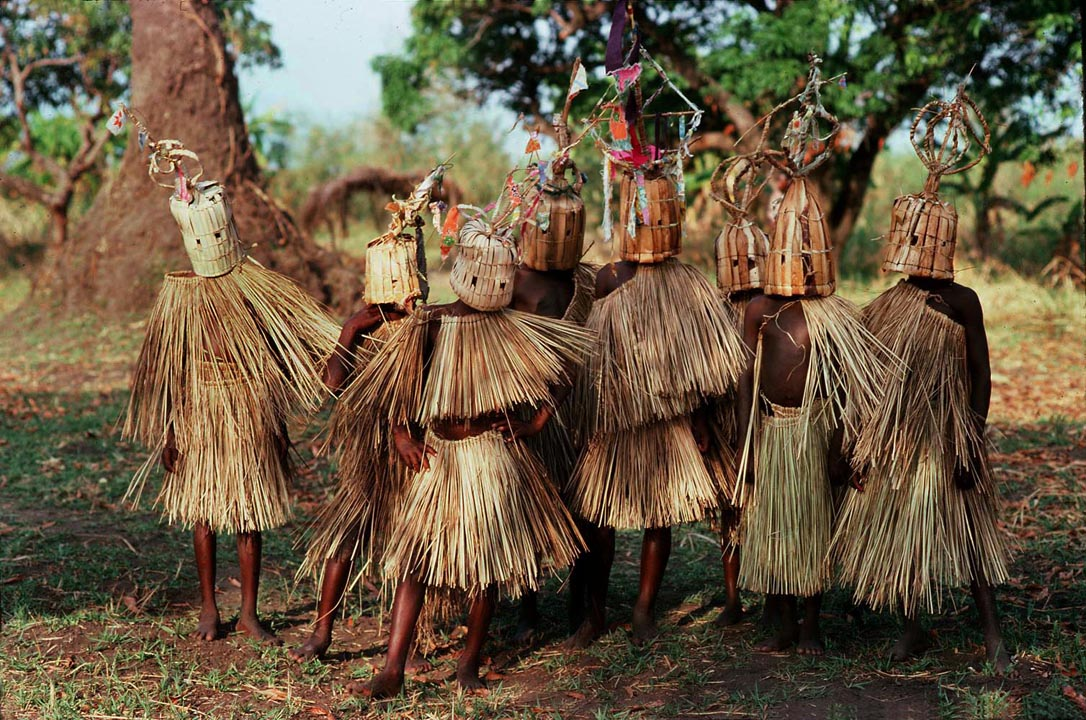
9–10-year-old boys of the Yao tribe in Malawi participating in circumcision and initiation rites

The male circumcision rate in Malawi is estimated to be 21.6%.

In the South of Malawi, the Yao and Lomwe tribes practice tribal circumcision. There are fears that there is a heightened risk of spreading human immunodeficiency virus as the surgeons use the same blade and encourage boys to have sex with women after the ceremony.

==== Mozambique ====
The male circumcision rate in Mozambique is estimated to be 47.4%.

==== Namibia ====
The male circumcision rate in Namibia is estimated to be 25.5%.

==== South Africa ====
The male circumcision rate in South Africa is estimated to be 44.7%. However, medical organisations in South Africa do not recommend it. Black South Africans are more likely to be circumcised than those who are Coloured, Indian or White, where the rate is under 25%. Circumcision is much more common among older men than younger men.

In some South African ethnic groups, circumcision has roots in several belief systems, and is performed most of the time on teenage boys:

The young men in the eastern Cape belong to the Xhosa ethnic group for whom circumcision is considered part of the passage into manhood. ... A law was recently introduced requiring initiation schools to be licensed and only allowing circumcisions to be performed on youths aged 18 and older. But Eastern Cape provincial Health Department spokesman Sizwe Kupelo told Reuters news agency that boys as young as 11 had died. Each year thousands of young men go into the bush alone, without water, to attend initiation schools. Many do not survive the ordeal.

According to one article, as of December 2015, 10 million men have undergone voluntary circumcision in East and Southern Africa since 2008.

In 2017, celebrities were recruited to launch the "man up" campaign to encourage more men to get circumcised.

South Africa refuses infant circumcisions, but with mixed reception. Additionally, they have boycotted "Do-It-Yourself" Circumcision devices, but only the ones made in Israel which was part of an already-existing boycott of Israel.

==== Zambia ====
The male circumcision rate in Zambia is estimated to be 12.8%.

In Zambia there is a circumcision programme underway because some believe it could reduce the transmission of human immunodeficiency virus.

==== Zimbabwe ====
The male circumcision rate in Zimbabwe is estimated to be 9.2%.

== Circumcision to prevent the spread of human immunodeficiency virus in Africa ==
WHO identified 14 countries with high rates of heterosexual human immunodeficiency virus transmission and historically low levels of male circumcision coverage (nationally or sub-nationally), and were priorities for scale-up. They are Botswana, Ethiopia, Kenya, Lesotho, Malawi, Mozambique, Namibia, Rwanda, South Africa, Eswatini, Uganda, Zambia, Zimbabwe and Tanzania. From 2008 to mid-2014, around 5.8 million men were circumcised as part of an effort to prevent HIV.

PEPFAR (the US President's Emergency Fund for AIDS Relief) supported over 15 million circumcisions in 14 countries in Southern and Eastern Africa from 2007 to 2017.

In 2020, the World Health Organization (WHO) reiterated that male circumcision is an efficacious intervention for HIV prevention if carried out by medical professionals under safe conditions.
