= Saharan rock art =

Area of archaeological study

Map of rock art in the Sahara

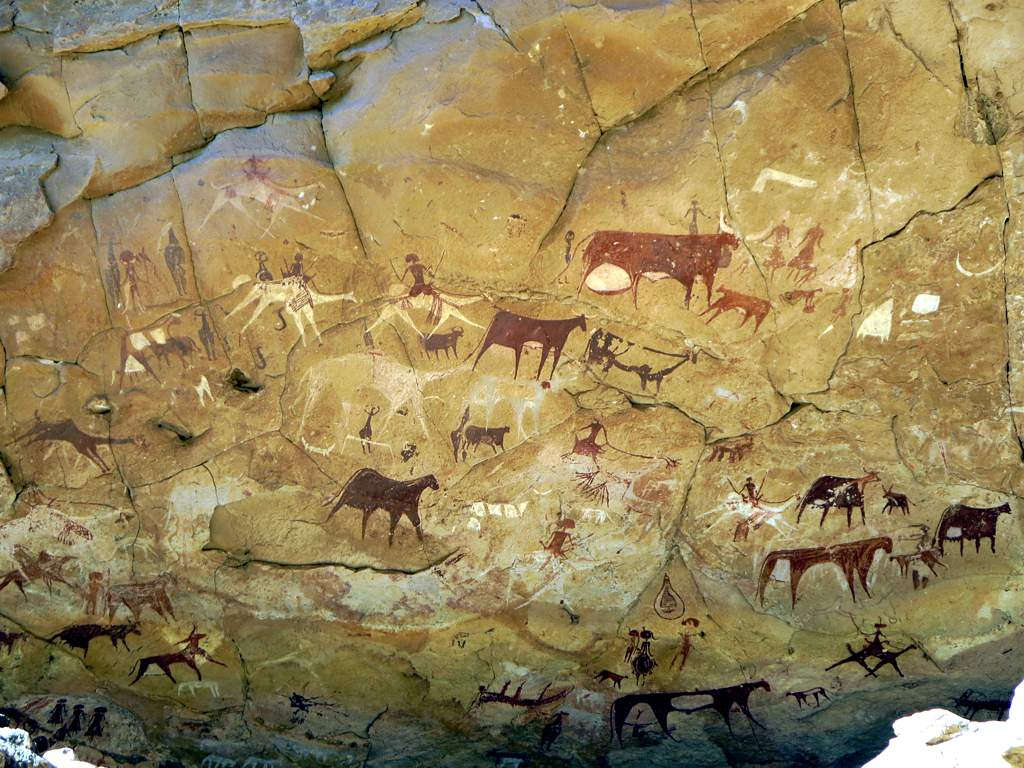
Manda Guéli Cave in the Ennedi Mountains, northeastern Chad

Saharan rock art is a significant area of archaeological study focusing on artwork carved or painted on the natural rocks of the central Sahara desert. The rock art dates from numerous periods starting c. 12,000 years ago.

The paintings and carvings of the Sahara are endangered and vulnerable; much of the rock art on uncovered rock has already disappeared. This is due to time and how the area has changed, as well as the improper exploration of this sites in the past. Organizations such as the Trust for African Rock Art are researching and recording as much information about Saharan rock art as possible, while raising awareness of threats to the art itself.

New discoveries and ongoing research of the Sahara's rock art include findings of ancient symbols, mysterious figures, and scenes depicting early African society's relationship with animals. However, progress is slow due to the need for proper archaeology and comparison. Many have tried to hypothesize what these carvings and paintings mean using iconography to compare similarities with other pieces of art.

== Archaeological sites ==
=== Egypt ===
The rock art found in this region is often referred to as the ‘Wadi Sura style’, as scholars have identified stylistic and iconographic symbols (headless beasts, swimmers, and hand impressions) that appear to date to a similar time period.

- Cave of Swimmers: Wadi Sura I is located in the Gilf Kebir. This section of caves was discovered in 1933. Its name is derived from the figures on the wall who appear to be lined up and floating as if swimming.
- Cave of Beasts: Wadi Sura II, commonly called the "cave of beasts," was discovered by accident in 2002. It is located on the Gilf Kebir plateau and contains figures of people and animals alike. The painting show a society of hunter-gatherers who lived between c. 6500 and 4400 BCE.

=== Chad ===
Rock art has been found in the Tibesti Mountains and Ennedi Plateau of Chad.

- Tibesti: The rock art that exists in these mountains was created before dramatic climate change in the Saharan Desert caused the inhabitants to move towards the Nile Valley. Large animal engravings and other rock art dates to between 12,000 and 4,000 years ago.
- Ennedi: Much of the rock art in this area is from the Horse Period, made in the last 2,000 years. Pastoral period art is also found here. The period reflects the changes in societal practices and adaption to the environment.

=== Algeria ===
- Tassili n'Ajjer, the cave paintings found at Tassili n'Ajjer north of Tamanrasset, Algeria and at other locations depict vivid scenes of everyday life in central North Africa between about 10,000 BP and 6,000 BP, in the Later Stone Age. There are over 15,000 individual pieces of artwork in Tassili n'Ajjer; this includes paintings and rock engravings that depict the culture of Africans up to 12,000 years ago. They were created by a hunting people in the Capsian period between 5,000 and 3,900 BP who lived in a savanna region teeming with giant buffalo, elephant, rhinoceros, and hippopotamus, animals that no longer exist in the now-desert area.
- The rock art low-relief "Crying Cows", also found in the Tassili n'Ajjer plateau, depicts teardrops rolling down the faces of horned cattle. They are thought to be dated around 7,000 to 8,000 years ago when the climate wasn’t nearly as dry. These depict the pastoral period in the Saharas and incorporate a local myth that describes a shepherd carving the piece after being unable to find drinking water for his herd.
- South Oran
- Djelfa
- Ahaggar

=== Libya ===
- Mesak Settafet: Abundant rock art is found in this location, near a mountain chain in Libya. Art is made from engraving techniques such as grinding, pecking, and scratching. Outlines of animals are found in blackened sandstone.

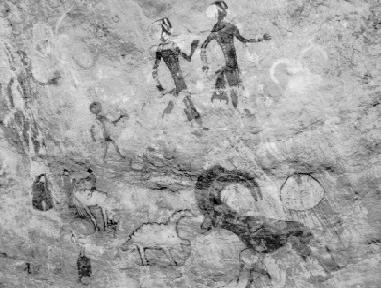
Neolithic cave paintings found in Tassili n'Ajjer (Plateau of the Chasms) region of the Sahara

- Tadrart Acacus: Near the sand dune of Murzuk, bordering Tassili n'Ajjer, exists 12,000 year old prehistoric rock art. It appears to reflect much of the same culture as the Tassili n'Ajjer rock art.

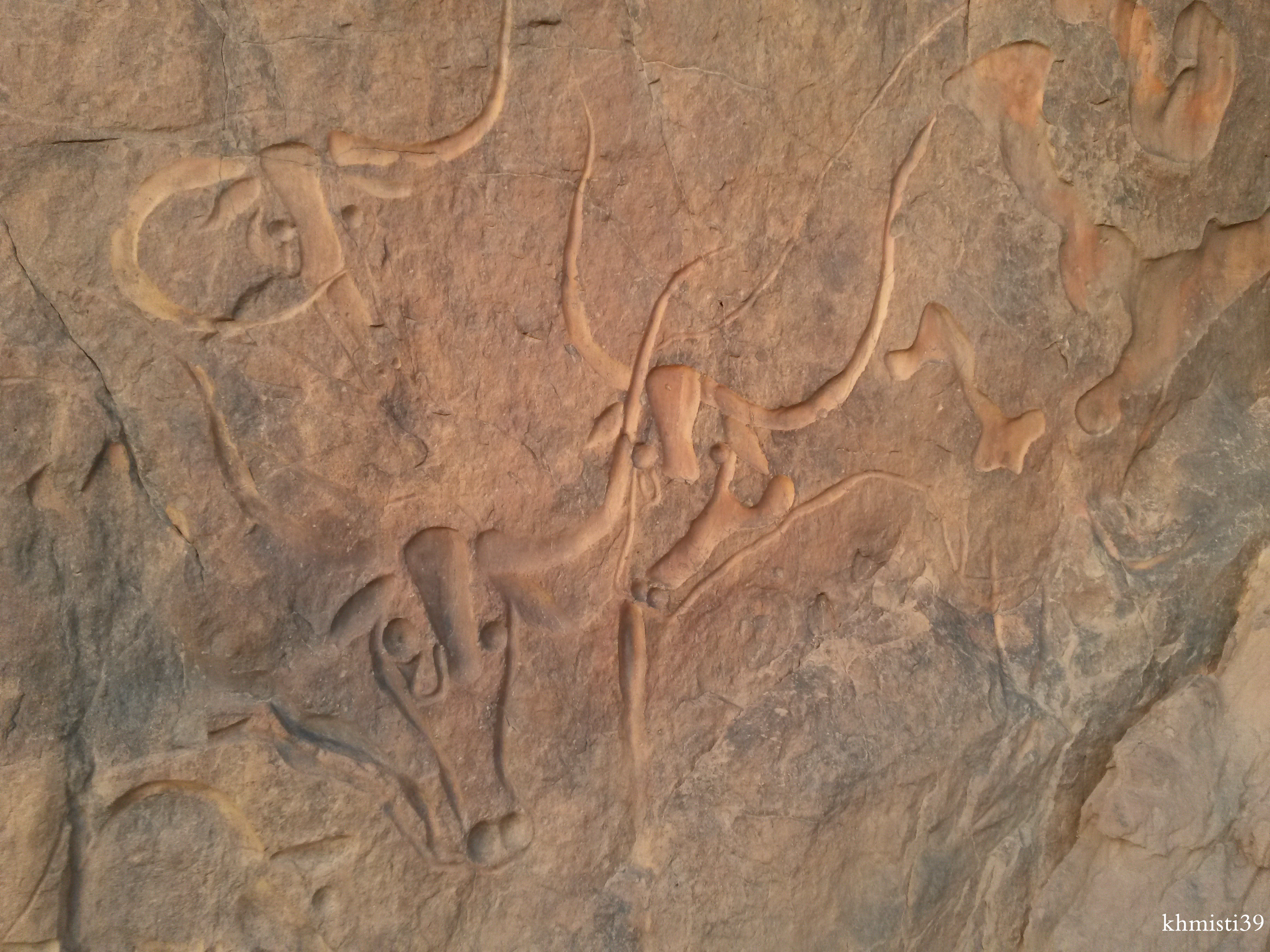
Crying Cows low-relief rock art found in Tassili n'Ajjer, Algeria. It depicts teardrops rolling down the faces of horned cattle.

=== Morocco ===
- Draa River
- Rock art of Figuig

=== Niger ===
- Aïr Mountains, Located in the northern part of Sudan, this region is home to over 1,500 rock drawings of animals, ranging from livestock to wild hippopotamuses. Here you can find the history of the Nubian peoples from the kingdom of Kush. The drawings are estimated to spand for a period of around 6000 years.

=== Sudan ===
- Sabu-Jaddi

== Research and interpretation ==
Archaeologists, anthropologists, and other researchers have been studying rock art to gain information about African cultures from the past. Many photographs are taken of the art so that it can be studied further. Dating the art of the Sahara is made possible through radiometric dating of organic material, including radiocarbon dating. Organic artifacts found at the sites can be dated, as can some residues on the rock art itself.

It is important to understand that these tools are only half of the equation, as they are used to determine when and how these artworks came to be. The other side is their interpretation, which not only considers the artwork in context to understand the meaning of each piece to the peoples who created them, but also serves to understand the past. When interpreting these works, it is imperative that the researchers keep personal biases outside of their thought processes and approach it from not only the perspective of an observer looking in, but also form the perspective of the individual who created them.

== Rock art time periods ==
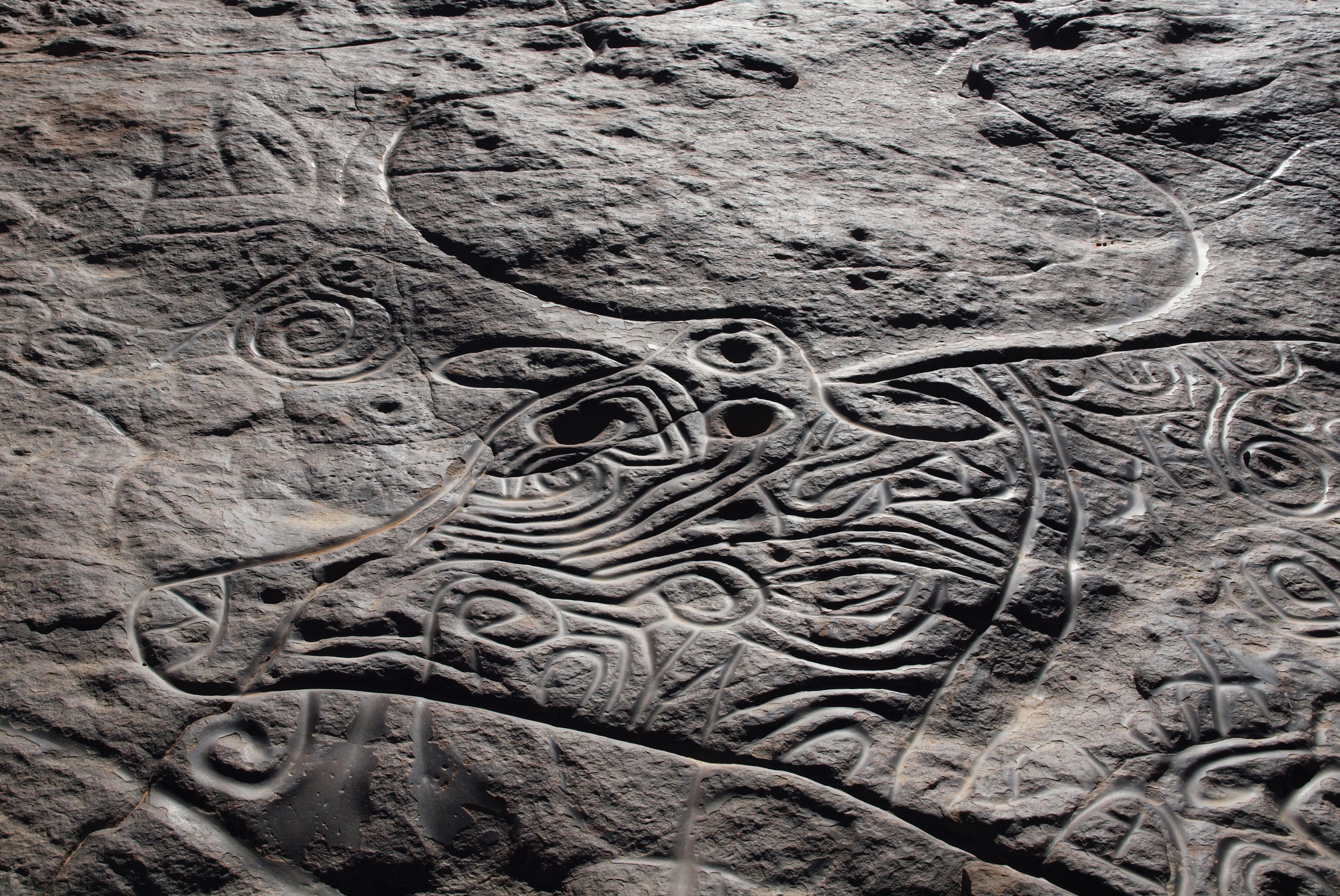
Rock art from the Bubalus time period in Tin Taghirt

- Large Wild Fauna Period (12,000 BP - 6000 BP): Saharan hunter-gatherer societies first made rock art. These images included animals that then lived in the area, including hippos, rhinos, elephants, giraffes, bubalus, aurochs, and large antelopes. Many of those animals no longer exist in the Sahara due to changes in climate that have caused the desiccation of the desert over the past several thousand years. Humans are shown hunting with spears and axes. The artwork portrays not only hunting, but the relationship between humans and animals. Most of the artwork can be found in Tassili n'Ajjer, Algeria.
- Kel Essuf Period (9800 BP): The Kel Essuf rock art tradition of engraving may have developed into the Round Head rock art tradition of painting.
- Round Head Period (9500 BP - 7000 BP): Hunter-gatherers on the Tassili Plateau painted distinctive human figures with round, featureless heads. Marking a shift in rock art, where human figure become more prominent, possibly reflecting changes in social and ritual practices. The art often portrays activities such as hunting, dancing, or ceremonial rituals.
- Pastoral Period (7200 BP - 3000 BP): One of the most prolific periods for rock art in the Sahara. During this period, humans were depicted with domesticated cattle, showing proof of a livelihood system known as pastoralism. Pictures show cultures herding animals and hunting as well, portrayed through men holding bows. Women and children are in camps where they lived. This style is shown around the Sahara with paintings and engravings. Herders eventually migrated to the west, east, and south as Saharan climates aridified.
- Horse Period (3200 BP - 1000 BP): Humans are shown with horses during this period. Paintings and few engravings have men on horses with weapons, as well as horse-drawn chariots. The people are also dressed in clothing instead of no clothing at all.
- Camel Period (3000 BP - 2000 BP): This is the final period of rock art in the Sahara, with images of camels appearing. Cattle and goats are frequently included in Camel Period art as well. Advanced weaponry is depicted, including pictures of men with spears, swords, and shields.

== See also ==
- Rock art of Iheren and Tahilahi (Pastoral Period)
- Rock art
- Prehistoric art
- List of Stone Age art
- Association des Amis de l'Art Rupestre Saharien
- African humid period
