= Qurta =

Village in Aswan Governorate, Egypt

- Location in Egypt
- Coordinates: 24°35′41″N 33°01′21″E
- Country: Egypt
- Governorate: Aswan Governorate
- Time zone: UTC+2 (EST)

Qurta is a village in Egypt, located on the east bank of the Nile River in the upper Nile valley. It is known for its petroglyphs dating back to the Upper Paleolithic period, from Egypt's prehistoric era, which can be found in Nubian Sandstone formations bordering the Nile. The Qurta petroglyphs are the first known and oldest example of Pleistocene-era artwork in North Africa.

== Petroglyphs ==
Qurta's petroglyphs, incised in Nubian Sandstone formations along the Nile, were discovered by modern archaeologists in 2005. Using luminescence dating via optically stimulated luminescence (OSL), researchers at Ghent University in Belgium determined the petroglyphs to be a minimum of 15,000 years old, and possibly between 17,000 and 19,000 years old. This dates the Qurta petroglyphs to the Upper Paleolithic era, from the prehistoric period of Egypt; they are the first known and earliest example of Pleistocene-era artwork in North Africa.

The Qurta petroglyphs depict aurochs, birds, hippopotamids, gazelle, hartebeest, fish, "some indeterminate creatures ('monsters' or hybrids)", and stylised human figures. A total of 185 individual figures have been identified.
