= Uan Muhuggiag =

Archaeological site in Libya

Coordinates: 24°54′N 10°22′E

Uan Muhuggiag is an archaeological site in Libya that was occupied by pastoralists between the early Holocene and mid-Holocene; the Tashwinat mummy, which was found at Uan Muhuggiag, was dated to 5600 BP and presently resides in the Assaraya Alhamra Museum in Tripoli.

== Climate and geography ==
Uan Muhuggiag is a rock shelter in southwestern Libya in what is now the Sahara Desert. It is located on the bank of the Wadi Teshuinat, sitting on a plateau in the Tadrart Acacus at almost 3000 feet above sea level. The site is approximately 1500 miles west of the Nile Valley.

Uan Muhuggiag was inhabited during the early- to mid-Holocene in what has been termed as the African Aqualithic culture complex, or "Green Sahara" period. Analysis of pollen found at the base levels of the site dating to between 7500 and 5000 BC indicates a wet savanna. Extensive samples from a number of sites indicate that tropical humid plants began to expand northward around 12,000 years ago after a lengthy dry period, eventually reaching deep into what is today the Sahara Desert.

NASA satellites have been able to detect a vast network of ancient river beds and paleolakes underneath the sand dunes around Uan Muhuggiag. Rock art findings depicting elephants, giraffes, and crocodiles were discovered at sites surrounding Uan Muhuggiag. Furthermore, fish bones, fish hooks, and harpoons were found at several sites in the Sahara region. It is speculated that the dry period that continues into the present day began around 5000 BP, which led to the abandonment of the site.

Uan Muhuggiag appears to have been inhabited from at least the sixth millennium BC to about 2700 BC, although not necessarily continuously. The stratigraphic sequence comprises seven distinct occupation levels. Layer 1 is the very top layer, followed by layer 1a. The middle level is labeled from 2a to 2d, with 2d being the oldest. Finally, below that, there is also a layer 3, which is further subdivided into section A, at the top, and section B, at the bottom. Layer 1 has been dated as beginning around 3800 BP, and consists of loose aeolian sand at the very top, slightly cemented sand and dung below that, and hearths at the bottom. Farther down, layer 2 has evidence of humified organic sand and lenses of fresh plant remains. These two layers represent the period of human occupation of the shelter. Layer 3 has even stronger humidified sand, as well as gypsum concretions. The stratigraphic sequence suggests that the shelter was inhabited during a much wetter period than today. The Tashwinat mummy was found on the eastern side of a 160 by 80 cm. excavation, under the lowest layer of coals, where the sandstone floor showed a deliberate round excavation of approximately 25 cm. in diameter and 3 cm. deep. The mummy lay just beneath a layer of vegetable fibers.

== Archaeology ==
Uan Muhuggiag was first excavated in 1950. The Tashwinat mummy was discovered by University of Rome Professor Fabrizio Mori in 1958. More recently, in 1982, the site was excavated again by Barbara Barich.

=== Tashwinat mummy ===
The most noteworthy find at Uan Muhuggiag is the well-preserved mummy of a young boy of approximately 2 1/2 years old. The child was embalmed, set in a fetal position and placed in a sack made of antelope skin insulated by a layer of leaves. The boy's organs were removed, as evidenced by incisions in his abdomen and thorax, and an organic preservative was inserted to stop the body from decomposing. An ostrich eggshell necklace was also found around his neck.

The mummy of the child has been radiocarbon dated, via the deepest coal layer where it was found, to 7438 ± 220 BP, and, via the animal hide it was wrapped in, to 5405 ± 180 BP, which has been calibrated to 6250 cal BP. This date precedes the earliest known Ancient Egyptian mummies by one thousand years.

Another date for the animal hide made from the skin of an antelope, which was accompanied by remnants of a grind stone and a necklace made from the eggshell of an ostrich, is 4225 ± 190 BCE.

In 1958–1959, an archaeological expedition led by Antonio Ascenzi conducted anthropological, radiological, histological, and chemical analyses on the Uan Muhuggiag mummy. Morphological, anthropometric, radiological, histological, and chemical examination was performed. By these means it was possible to deduce the child had negroid features. The body had been eviscerated and undergone natural desiccation. One other individual, an adult, was found at Uan Muhuggiag, buried in a crouched position. However, the body showed no evidence of evisceration or any other method of preservation.

Soukopova (2013) referenced a laboratory examination of the cutaneous features of the child buried at the site in which the results verified that remains of the child possessed a dark skin complexion.

=== Rock art ===
Among other significant finds at Uan Muhuggiag are elaborate rock paintings, mostly attributed to the later occupation period of around 5000 BP. There are more than 100 rock paintings on the walls and ceiling of the shelter. The most notable of these are identified as, the Round Head paintings. They were named as such because the heads depicted were quite large, out of proportion to the rest of the body, and also very round with a distinct lack of features. Additionally, there was one painting depicting these types of figures inside a boat, which may have had a ritual or religious significance. One particular figure inside the boat was upside-down and Mori interpreted that figure as representing someone who was dead.

Some of the rock art depicted cattle with herders and running hunters. There was also a painting of two oxen that was found on a rock that had detached from the wall above. The stratigraphic layer confirmed the painting to date from about 4700 BP. This provided conclusive evidence that the inhabitants of Uan Muhuggiag at that time were pastoralists.

=== Animal and plant remains ===
Animal remains found at the site include domestic cattle, sheep or goat, wild cat, wild donkey, warthog, gazelle, hare, baboon, and turtle. Domestic cattle bones were also found in the lowest layers and perhaps date from the eighth millennium BP, providing some of the earliest known evidence of pastoralism in the Sahara. Among the faunal remains in the middle layers, dated to be roughly between 5300 and 6000 BP, remains of sheep and goats appear more frequently. It has been surmised that this was probably the time period when the shelter was most actively occupied. Fruits and plant seeds were also found. There were more than 30 different species of plant seeds found during the 1982 excavations by Barich, including millet and wild melon. The seeds spanned a long period of time, with the most recent being three date seeds that were radiocarbon dated to 2130 BP, suggesting that the shelter continued to be inhabited intermittently, even after the period of main occupation and subsequent drought.

=== Other finds ===
The pottery at Uan Muhuggiag was found mainly in the top layers. It is of the dotted wavy-line decorated variety that was common in the region during that period. There is evidence that a two-toothed tool was used in order to create equal spacing between the dots, known as the "return" technique. Other finds at Uan Muhuggiag include two hemispherical hollows dug out of the rock, measuring approximately 30 to 40 centimeters, called "kettles". These were found completely covered by deposits and are estimated to be from at least 7500 BP. Several pieces of charcoal were also found, the oldest of which were determined to be 7800 years old. They were probably used in large fireplace pits. The lower levels also uncovered backed and microlithic tools, while lithics such as flakes and arrowheads were found in the upper layers. A total of 406 stone tool fragments were found in level 2a, and 77 in the earliest occupation level of 2d.

== Significance ==
Antonio Ascenzi, a pathologist, believes that Uan Muhuggiag and the surrounding area became inhabited around 10,000 BP by Negroid peoples, who followed the monsoon north. It has been suggested that some time later, around 7000 BP, people from Mesopotamia and the Middle East arrived, introducing pastoralism to the region. The idea of domestic cattle in Africa coming from the Fertile Crescent exclusively is now seen as having serious shortcomings. As no hard archaeological evidence supports this claim and subsequent archaeology has revealed a deep well of cattle integration and early association of cattle with religious and subsistence strategies in Holocene Africa. More modern scholarship has instead found that the origins of pastoralism, cattle worship and cattle domestication lie most likely in areas of the Sudanese Nile Valley (e.g., Affad). Several discoveries at Letti, in Sudan, suggest early burial and domestication of cattle, including early implements used to safely bleed cattle without harming them. The cultural practice of drinking cow blood on special occasions is still shared to this day by many Nilotic cattle herding groups in Africa, such as the Maasai and Dinka. One of the earliest burials of cattle can be found at the site of Nabta Playa, which had inhabitants that were of the same Nilo-Saharan traditions of Sudan and the broader Nile Valley. These people were responsible for sacrificial cattle burials in clay-lined and roofed chambers covered by rough stone tumuli. At one of the sites from the beginning of the Holocene (~10,000 BP), among the bones of wild fauna, remains of domesticated cattle with 'auroch-like' features were found. There is strong evidence that domestic livestock, principally cattle, played an important role in the lives of the inhabitants of Uan Muhuggiag, which is supported by the amount of cattle bones found at the site as well as evidence of a cattle cult and ritual sacrifice at a location in the Messak Plateau, approximately 60 miles in distance from the site.

The Tashwinat mummy found at Uan Muhuggiag was one thousand years older than the oldest known Egyptian mummy. Its sophisticated form of evisceration indicates a highly advanced society that established Territoriality. Along with Takarkori building Rock shelter and Megalith. While using Petroglyph, Iconograph And HieroglyphsThat are possible predecessor to the Libyco-Berber alphabet. which referred to as a possible Civilization around 5600 BC. Some scholars argue that the sub-Saharan African population living there could have had an influence on the process of mummification used in Ancient Egypt a thousand years later.

Considerable debate also exists about whether the rock art found at Uan Muhuggiag along with the two mummies, signify that the shelter was a burial place or otherwise sacred. Mori was a strong advocate of this theory and believed that the site was a place where a cult of the dead took place.
