= Takarkori =

Archaeological site in southwestern Libya

Tadrart Acacus Mountains
- Tadrart Acacus Mountains
- 24°53′N 10°20′E
- Type: Mountain Range
- Location: Ghat District, Libya
- Region: Northern Africa

Takarkori is an archaeological site and rock shelter located in the Tadrart Acacus Mountains of southwestern Libya. During the Holocene, humans occupied the site between 10,170 cal BP and 4650 cal BP. Takarkori rockshelter is one of two sites where the earliest evidence of plant processing in pottery has been found, is the first Saharan site where ancient DNA was able to be extracted, particularly from two interred individuals, and is also a site with artifacts which include bone tools, stone tools, wooden tools, pottery, fiber goods, and carved figurines.

== Geography ==
The Takarkori rockshelter is located in a valley within the Tadrart Acacus Mountains. To the west of the rockshelter lies the Erg Takarkori, a stretch of sand dunes. The valley that the rockshelter is situated in is called Wadi Takarkori, which separates the Algerian and Libyan Acacus Mountains and is also the central point between two basins. Takarkori rockshelter lies near Libya's border with Algeria, within the Fezzan region. This area is part of the Libyan Desert, an area of the Sahara. Today, the Acacus Mountains are hyperarid.

== Climate ==
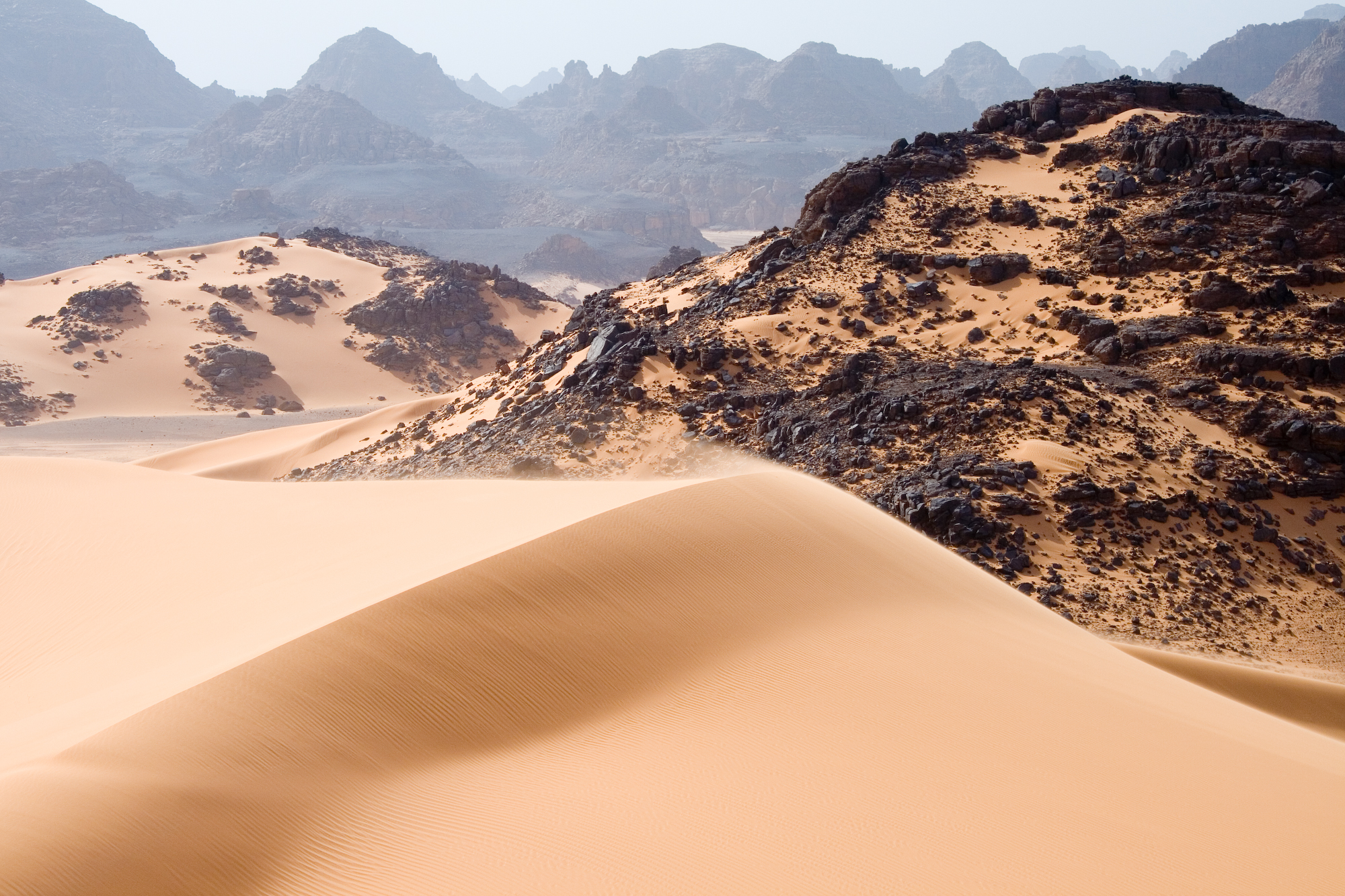
Arid (desert) climate of the Acacus Mountains

Wadi Takarkori most likely had flowing water from the Late Acacus period until the end of the Middle Pastoral period, with wetlands nearby. This was the wadi Tanezzuft, and two notable lakes that would have existed near Takarkori were Takarkori Lake and Garat Ouda. These lakes, along with a series of other small lakes in the nearby dunes, supported diverse populations of aquatic flora and fauna. A high density of fish remains at Takarkori associated with this period indicate that people were routinely fishing near the rock shelter. Additionally, the presence of residues from plants such as potamogeton on potsherds show that humans at Takarkori were processing aquatic flora as well.

In the Early Pastoral period, the small lakes may have suffered due to a climatic shift. However, Takarkori Lake and Garat Ouda persisted throughout the Middle Pastoral period and well into the Late Pastoral period. During the Late Pastoral period, the Sahara was becoming increasingly arid. This led to the total loss of both lakes by around 5000 BP. Archaeological evidence shows that the frequency of fish remains decreased as aridity increased. Scholars infer that the people living at Takarkori moved to pastoralism as fish became less available as a food source. Within pastoralism, food sources also changed; herders moved from cattle to smaller domesticates. Nevertheless, an analysis of pottery excavated from the rock shelter indicates water was generally present when people lived at Takarkori, even in times of aridity.

== Archaeology ==
There are many archaeological sites in the Wadi Takarkori area, including cairns, rock art, and rockshelters. The Acacus Mountains are famous for their rock art, which includes both petroglyphs and pictographs showing human and faunal figures. Rockshelters in this region have long been recognized for their stratigraphic sequences; archaeological sites within rockshelters are generally more protected from the harsh Saharan environment than open-air sites. Sites similar to Takarkori rockshelter have been excavated since the mid 20th century.

Takarkori rockshelter has been researched by multiple archaeological teams. Notably, Stefano Biagetti and Savino di Lernia excavated Takarkori for multiple field seasons in 2003, 2004, and 2006 as part of the Wadi Takarkori Project. More recent work by Julie Dunne and Stefania Vai and their teams led to new plant processing and ancient DNA discoveries respectively. Sediment deposits within the rockshelter contain evidence that humans occupied the Takarkori rockshelter for thousands of years, gradually changing their food pathways. During the Holocene in Northern Africa, humans generally began transitioning from hunting and gathering to pastoralism; Takarkori is one of few sites that has the detailed stratigraphy to preserve evidence for this transition in the archaeological record. The enclosed environment and aridity of the site has also preserved a high density of biological remains, including flora, fauna, and human remains. The four archaeological periods in which humans occupied Takarkori are the Late Acacus period, Early Pastoral period, Middle Pastoral period, and Late Pastoral period.

=== Baskets ===
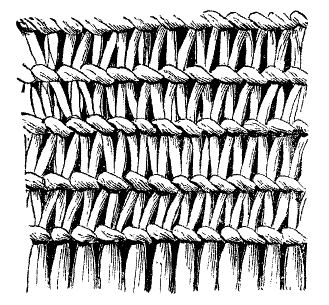
Twined weaving technique similar to techniques used at the Takarkori rockshelter

There have been a wide variety of artifacts found in the rockshelter including different types of tools, pottery, and baskets. Various artifacts were also found in and around the burial area in the back of the rockshelter. These artifacts included an animal figurine, an ostrich egg shell bead head cap, and a necklace.

The presence of baskets and woven goods at the site are unique, as fiber goods do not typically preserve well in the archaeological record. These remains show at least eight different weaving techniques, though all are twined. Twining is a process where strands are moved horizontally through fixed vertical strands. Most of the woven goods were constructed from plants stems and fibers, though some had animal fibers as well. The majority of the basket remains date to the Late Acacus period, and may have been used to gather wild plants.

=== Pottery ===
A diverse assemblage of pottery has been found at Takarkori. Pottery dating to the beginning of the Late Acacus is coeval with the introduction of pottery to the Libyan Desert. This indicates that the hunter-gatherers at Takarkori may have been among the first people in the region to use pottery. A pottery analysis was conducted using Caneva's methodology. Surface colors are different for each period of occupation, showing different heating and cooling processes. Five different fabrics are present from a scale of course to fine. Coarser fabrics and thicker walls are associated with earlier phases of occupation and finer fabrics and thinner walls are present through the later phases. There are two main types of pottery decoration: impressed and incised. It is likely that individual families manufactured their own pottery with raw materials procured from the surrounding area.

=== Pigments ===
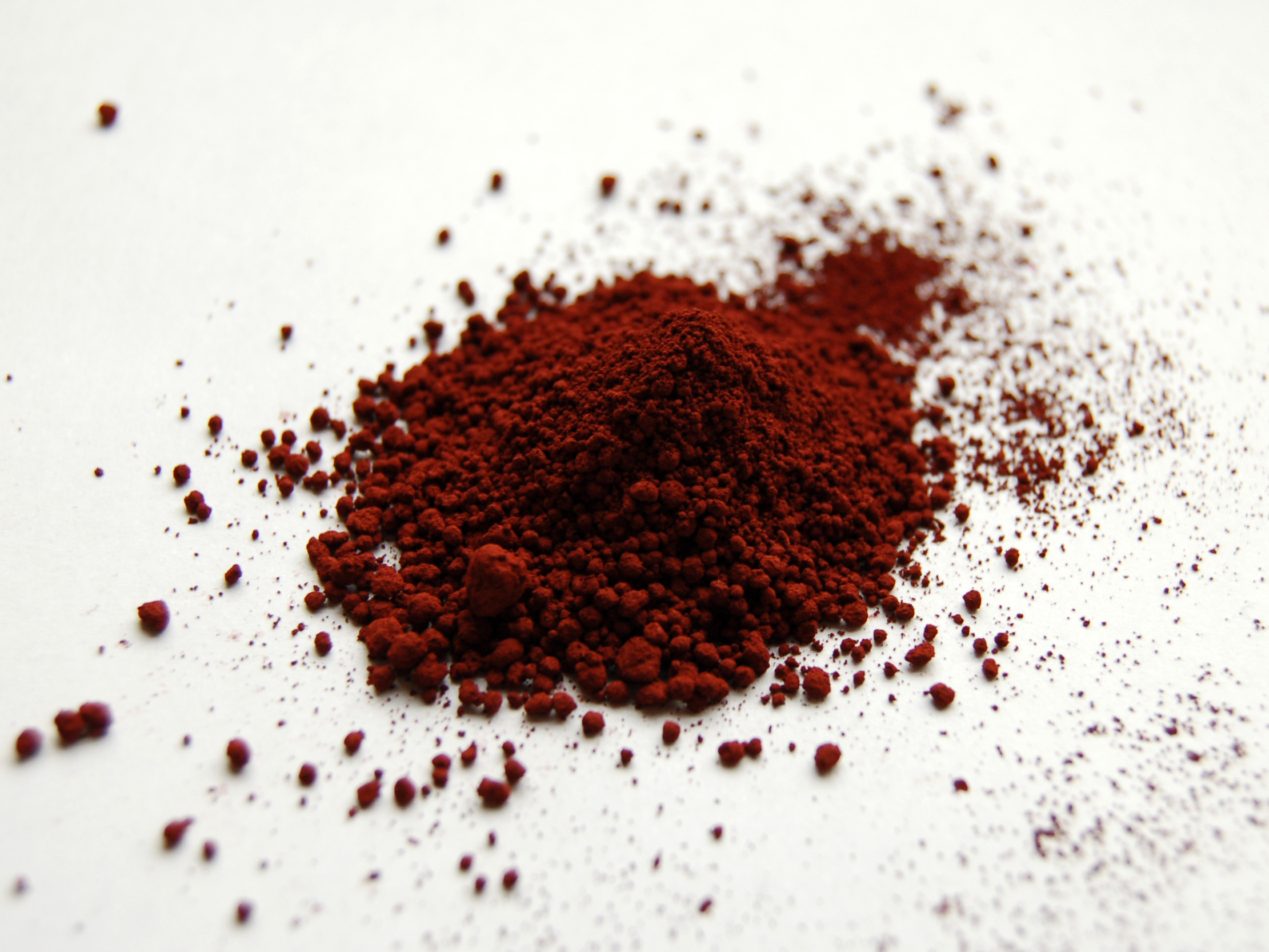
Hematite, one of the most common pigments found at Takarkori, which is composed of iron oxide.

Pigments are present at Takarkori. Pigment artifacts fall into three main categories: pigments, pigmented items, and painted items. Color pigments may have been processed at the rockshelter in order to produce pictographs in the Tadrart Acacus. Multiple lower and upper grinding stones from the rockshelter have different colored pigment stains including red and yellow. Most of these stones date to the first phases of occupation. Other types of artifacts with pigment found at Takarkori include flakes and stone tools, bone tools, pottery, and a wooden stick. One broken pebble showed signs of being painted, and poorly preserved zoomorphic pictographs may be present on rocks in the shelter. The pigments were likely sourced from within the Tadrart Acacus.

=== Plants ===
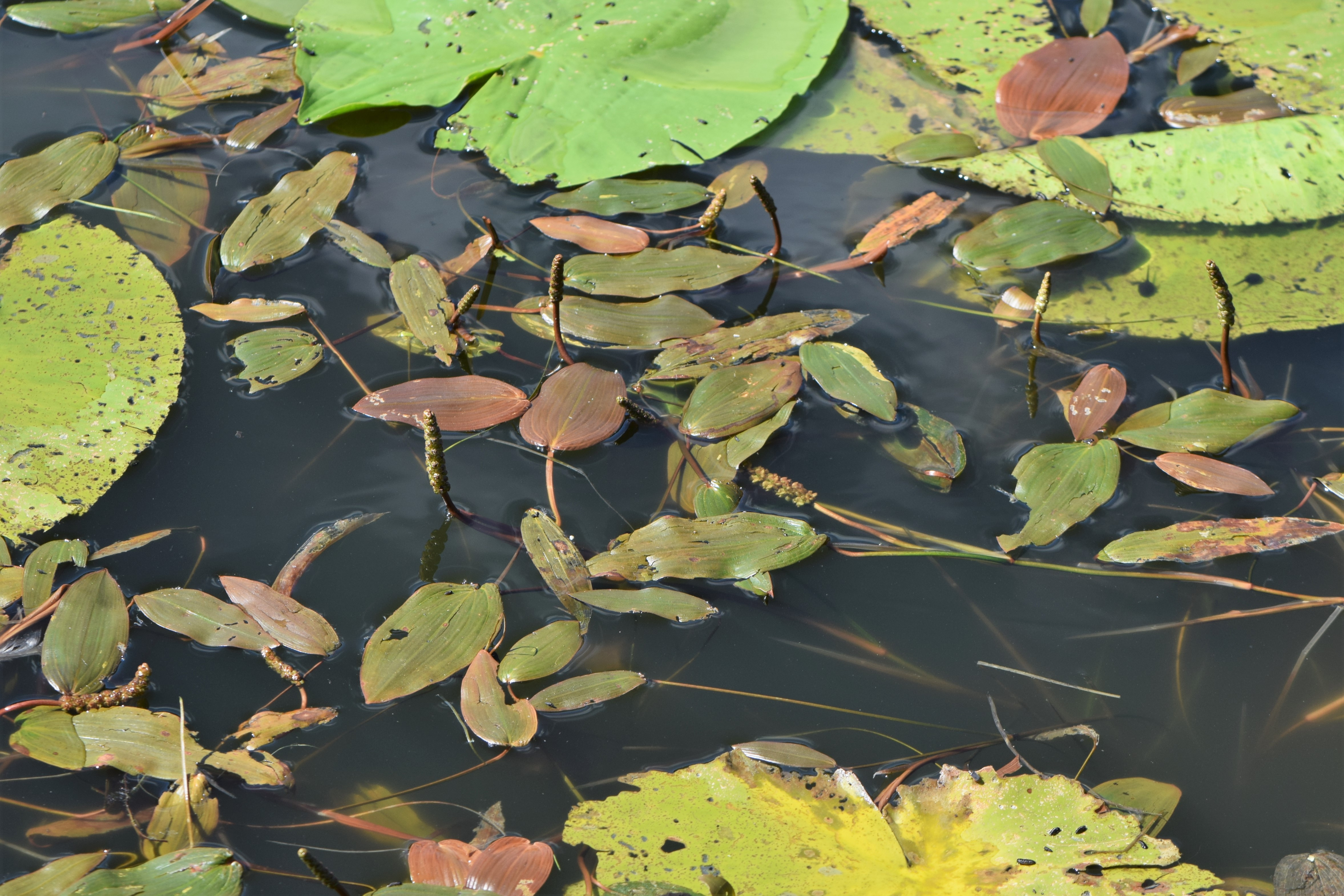
Potamogeton plant

Takarkori and Uan Afuda have yielded potsherds with the earliest evidence of processed plant remains in the world. The plant remains found within the pots are consistent with the flora that would have been present in the Sahara during the Holocene, and include both terrestrial and aquatic species. These remains date to 8200–6400 BC, and coincide with the period in which people were hunting and gathering at Takarkori.

However, there is also evidence that pastoral peoples at Takarkori continued to process wild plants in cooking vessels even after the introduction of domesticated animals. Potsherds with plant remains were found in stratigraphic layers coinciding with the Late Acacus period, Early Pastoral period, and Middle Pastoral period, with the majority uncovered from the Middle Pastoral period. Both animal and plant residues were extracted from the cooking vessels, but at Takarkori, over half of the potsherds contained plants remains. Some of the species of plants that were discovered include cattails and potamogeton, an aquatic plant. Plant remains unassociated with pottery have also been found in abundance at Takarkori.

== Periods of occupation ==
=== Late Acacus Period (10,200 cal BP - 8000 cal BP) ===
In the Late Acacus period, hunter and gatherers occupied Takarkori. These peoples stayed in and around the rockshelter for long periods of time and had a diverse diet. Plant residues on potsherds in the rockshelter indicate that these people processed wild plants. The presence of baskets containing plant remains from this period also support the idea that people were gathering and eating wild plants. The Late Acacus peoples also hunted Barbary sheep and fished. Fish bones are the most common faunal remain associated with this period, with birds and mammals making up only a small percentage of the assemblage. The Late Acacus period can be further split into three subsections: LA1, LA2, and LA3. In LA1, people started constructing structures with stone. Analysis of compacted floor sediments show that people may have settled down more during the LA2 phase. The amount of hearths increased from LA1 to LA3, and a stone windbreak feature and infant burial is also present from LA3.

=== Early Pastoral Period (8300 cal BP - 7300 cal BP) ===
During the Early Pastoral period, early pastoral animal herders began to reside at Takarkori. Their occupation at the rockshelter was relatively stable. This is the first period in which human remains were found. Several human burials were documented within the Early Pastoral phase, and all of these individuals were women or juveniles. This could be indicative of a matrilineal society. While these people had some domesticated animals, they continued to fish and hunt. Fish are most common faunal remain found from this period. These early herders also continued to prepare wild plants in pottery. The Early Pastoral can be split into two phases: Early Pastoral 1 and Early Pastoral 2. Burials are present in both phases.

=== Middle Pastoral Period (7100 cal BP - 5600 cal BP) ===
In the Middle Pastoral period, the peoples at Takarkori began to rely on domesticated animal products more heavily. This is the first period in which there is evidence that the people in this area were milking their cattle. These pastoralists returned to Takarkori seasonally with their herds. Like with the Early Pastoral herders, the Middle Pastoral peoples also fished and processed wild plants in pottery; the highest density of plant remains in pottery is from this period. More burials of young individuals and women are associated with the Middle Pastoral phase of Takarkori. These individuals are very well preserved, with some individuals showing partial mummification. This period can also be split into Middle Pastoral 1 and Middle Pastoral 2. The amount of hearths do not increase through these phases (as seen in the Late Acacus). The compaction and makeup of sediments from the Middle Pastoral 1 show that people were most likely living in the rockshelter during this time. However, strata of dung from the Middle Pastoral 2 could indicate that people no longer occupied Takarkori during this time, instead using it as a pen for domesticates.

=== Late Pastoral Period (5900 cal BP - 4300 cal BP) ===
During the Late Pastoral period, occupation was less sustained. Smaller, more mobile groups of pastoral herders used Takarkori as a temporary shelter, as indicated by strata of dung. Within the stratigraphic sequence, there is also a decrease in grinding stones, burials, and fish remains. There is currently no evidence that the people at Takarkori were processing plants in pottery during this period. The trend for interments during this period seems favor cairns rather than burials. However, one burial is present at Takarkori from the Late Pastoral period despite this. The Late Pastoral period coincides with the end of the African humid period, and researchers have speculated that desertification and climate change in the Sahara prompted pastoralists to eventually desert Takarkori.

== Ancient DNA ==
Takarkori is the site of "fifteen burials of women, juveniles and children" who all originated from the same area. Other interments were identified in the surrounding wadi. For the burials within Takarkori, the majority were located close together deep within the shelter. Most of the burials are associated with the Early Pastoral period, though the best preserved individuals date to the Middle Pastoral period.

Two individuals from this period had preserved tissue through mummification, which allowed archaeologists to analyze the first ancient DNA from the Sahara. Work on Saharan ancient DNA had been previously unsuccessful due to the lack of preservation. The results from the ancient DNA samples show that the two women have identical haplotypes from basal haplogroup N. This haplogroup was previously unseen in Saharan Africa. Researchers postulate that this genetic lineage could have come from the Near East, possibly along with pastoral herders and herding practices tens of thousands of years ago. The individuals at Takarkori were also analyzed using an isotopic analysis. Data obtained supports the idea that the people buried within the rockshelter are from the same geographic area.

A study in 2025 by researchers from the Max Planck Institute for Evolutionary Anthropology in Leipzig further sequenced the two individuals, and discovered that most of their ancestry was from an unknown ancestral North African lineage, related to the African admixture component found in Iberomaurusians. However, in contrast to the Iberomaurusian Taforalt remains who showed roughly half as many Neanderthal variants and ancestry as Eurasians (and are modeled as roughly half Western Eurasian in ancestry), Takarkori samples had much less admixture from Neanderthals, but more than contemporary Sub-Saharan Africans. The study concluded that the Takarkori people represented/mostly derive from an extinct population native to North Africa that diverged there before the Out-of-Africa migration that gave rise to Eurasians, but never left Africa and became mostly isolated (both from sub-Saharan African and Eurasian groups). The Tarkakori people were modeled as deriving 93% of their ancestry from this unknown African group and 7% from a Natufian-like population from the Middle East. The study also suggests "that the Taforalt ancestry is composed of a 60% contribution from a Natufian-like Levantine population, with the remaining 40% derived from a Takarkori-like ancestral North African population". According to the study, the Takarkori people were distinct, both from contemporary sub-Saharan Africans and from non-Africans/Eurasians although contributing ancestry to the Fulani people. They had "only a minor component of non-African ancestry" but did "not carry sub-Saharan African ancestry, suggesting that, contrary to previous interpretations, the Green Sahara was not a corridor connecting Northern and sub-Saharan Africa, though the paper noted "The results indicated that the FulaniA have an increased affinity to Takarkori-like ancestry, as do other Sahelian and West African groups. These findings are consistent with the archaeological evidence of the southward expansion of Pastoral Neolithic groups from Central Sahara." As per Johannes Krause of the Max Planck Institute, one of the authors of the study "The Takarkori lineage likely represents a remnant of the genetic diversity present in northern Africa between 50,000 and 20,000 years ago."
