= Acacus Mountains =

UNESCO World Heritage Site
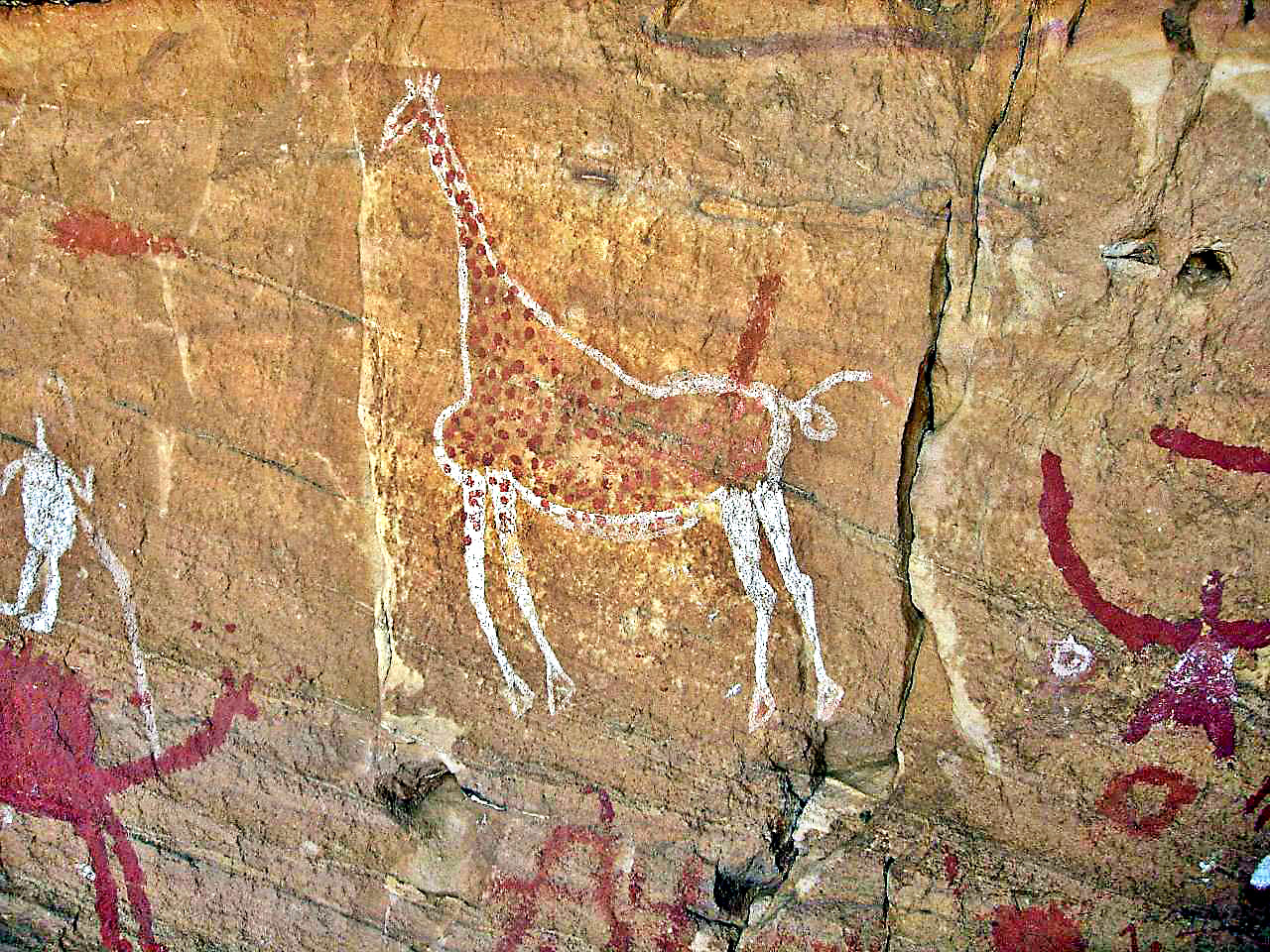

- Location within Libya
- Official name: Rock-Art Sites of Tadrart Acacus
- Location: Ghat District, Libya
- Criteria: Cultural: (iii)
- Reference: 287
- Inscription: 1985 (9th Session)
- Endangered: 2016–...
- Coordinates: 24°50′N 10°20′E

The Acacus Mountains or Tadrart Akakus (Arabic: تدرارت أكاكوس / ALA-LC: Tadrārt Akākūs) form a mountain range in the desert of the Ghat District in western Libya, part of the Sahara. They are situated east of the city of Ghat, Libya, and stretch north from the border with Algeria, about 100 kilometres (62 mi). The area has a particularly rich array of prehistoric rock art.

== History ==
=== Etymology ===
Tadrart is the feminine form of "mountain" in the Berber languages (masculine: adrar).

=== Archaeology ===
The Acacus Mountains were occupied by hunter-gatherers continuously in the Holocene despite fluctuating climate in the African Humid Period. These sites have been important in understanding food processing and mobility as people adapted to climate variation. Animal domestication as part of the African Neolithic was introduced in this region by around 7000 BP, and pastoralism and foraging were the primary subsistence strategies of people in this region, not agriculture.

Sites in this region have been split into three main occupation periods: the Early Acacus, Late Acacus, and Pastoral Neolithic. The Early Acacus was a humid period from c. 9810 – 8880 BP characterized by small groups of mobile people living in valleys and along lowland lakes. The Late Acacus (c. 8870 – 7400 BP) was a dry period characterized by more sedentary people in larger groups living in valleys. These people greatly intensified food processing and storage of wild grains and used grinding stones and pottery extensively. The Pastoral Neolithic was characterized by increased mobility in a more humid environment again, and the domestication of animals. These people showed reduced usage of grinding stones.

=== Rock art ===
Map of rock art in the Sahara

The area is known for its rock art and was inscribed as a UNESCO World Heritage Site in 1985 because of the importance of these paintings and carvings. The paintings date from 12,000 BCE to 100 CE and reflect cultural and natural changes in the area.

There are paintings and carvings of animals such as giraffes, elephants, ostriches and camels, but also of humans and horses. People are depicted in various daily life situations, for example while making music and dancing.

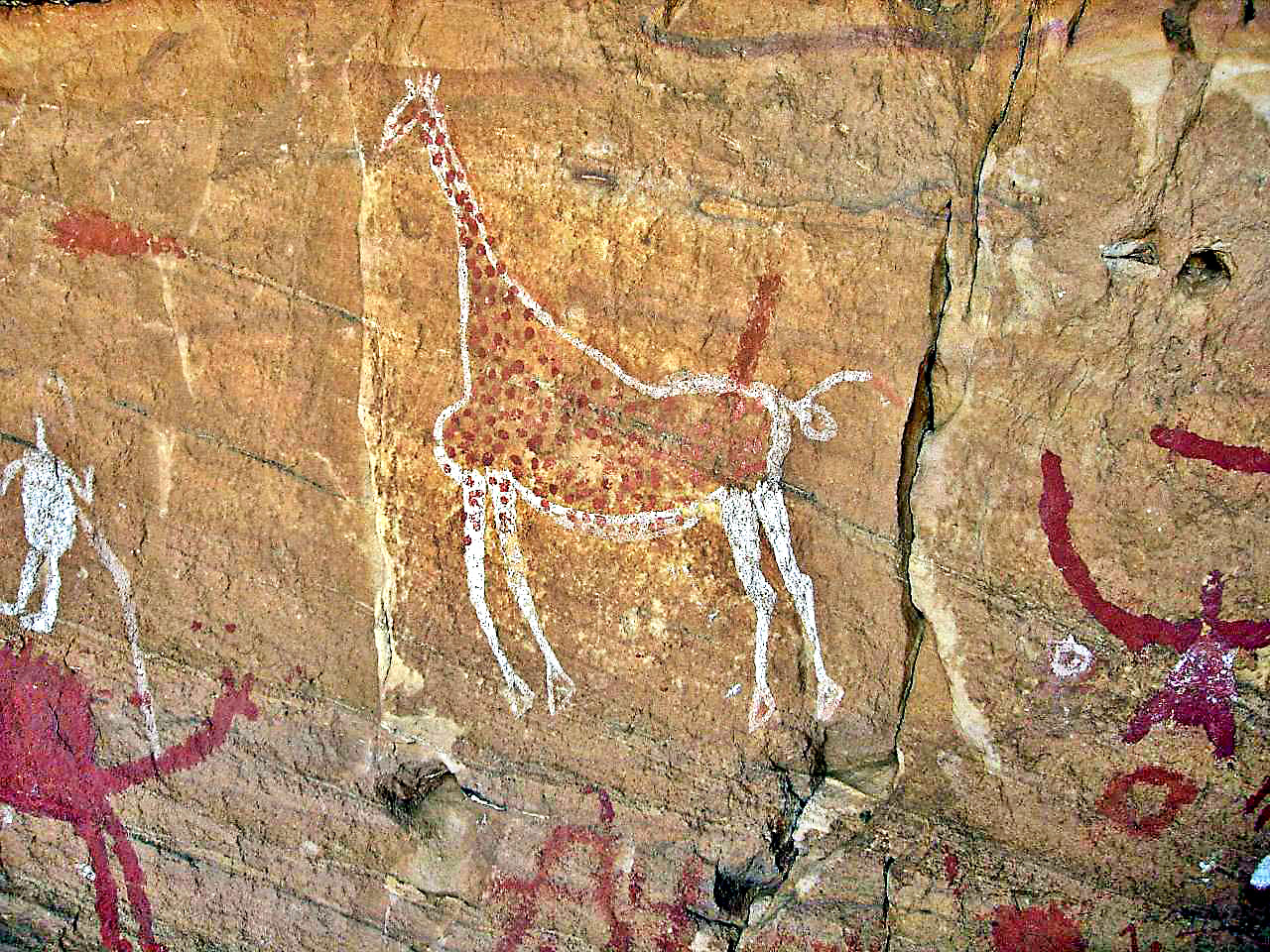
Giraffe

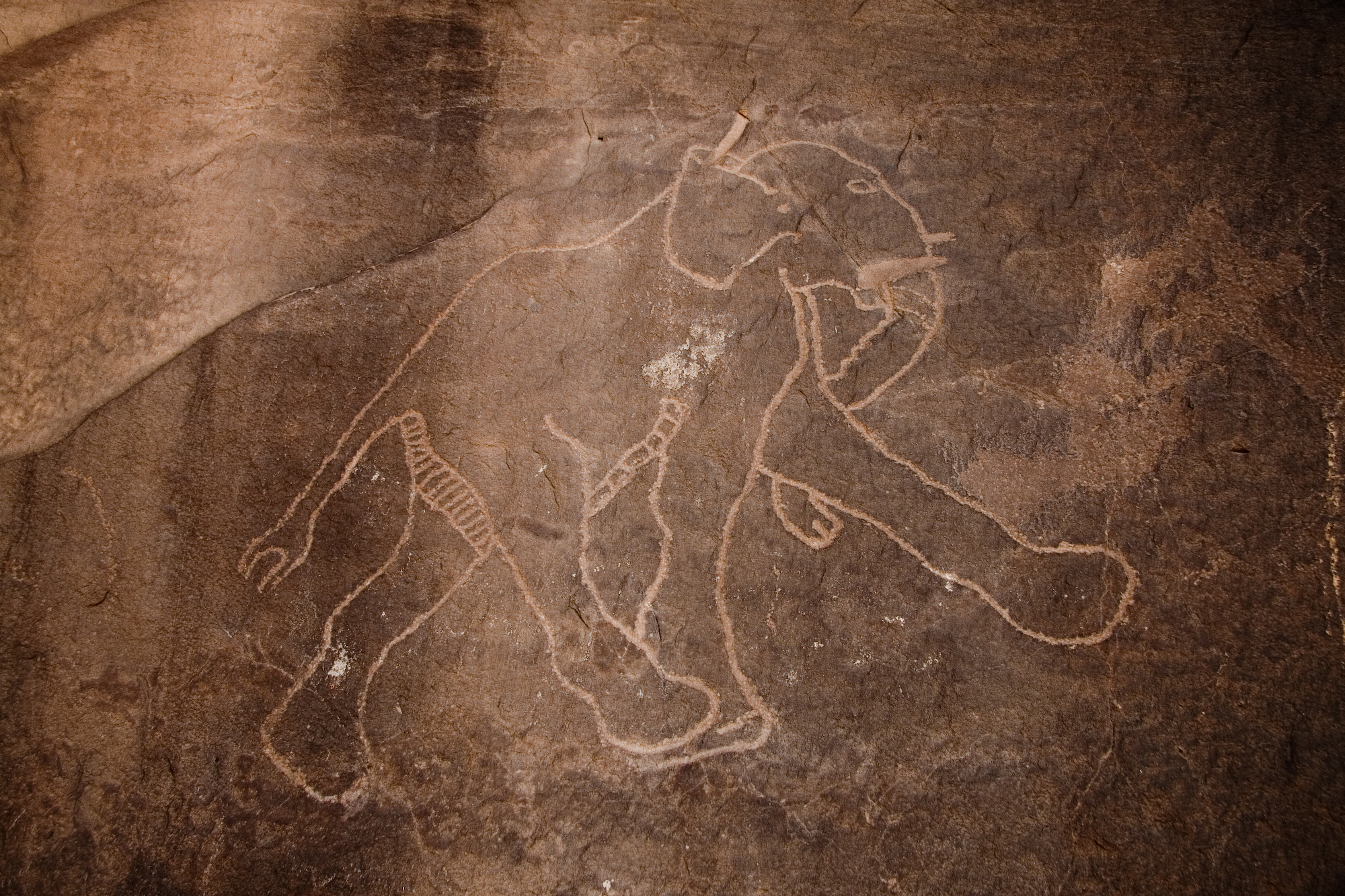
Elephant

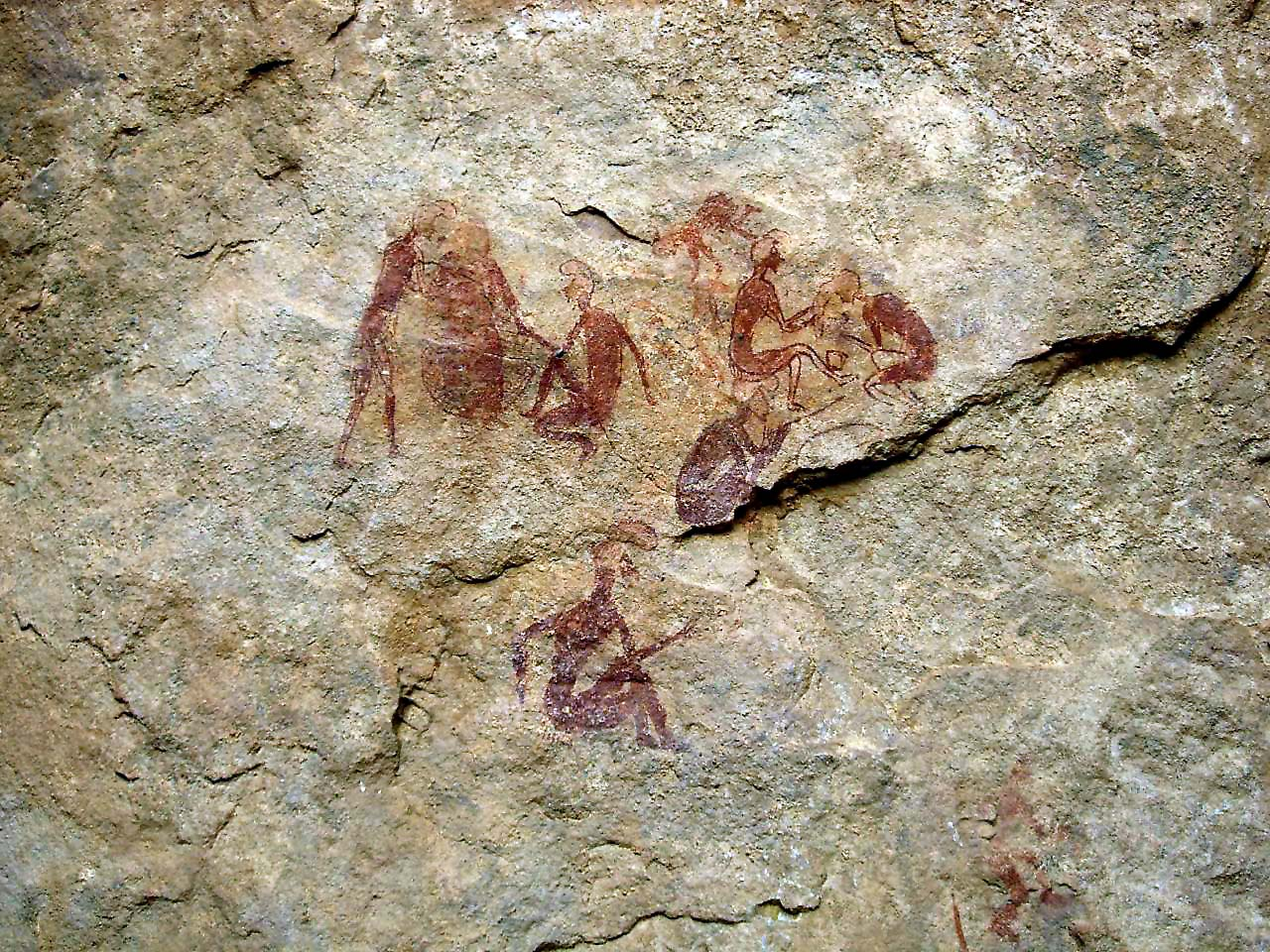
Human figures

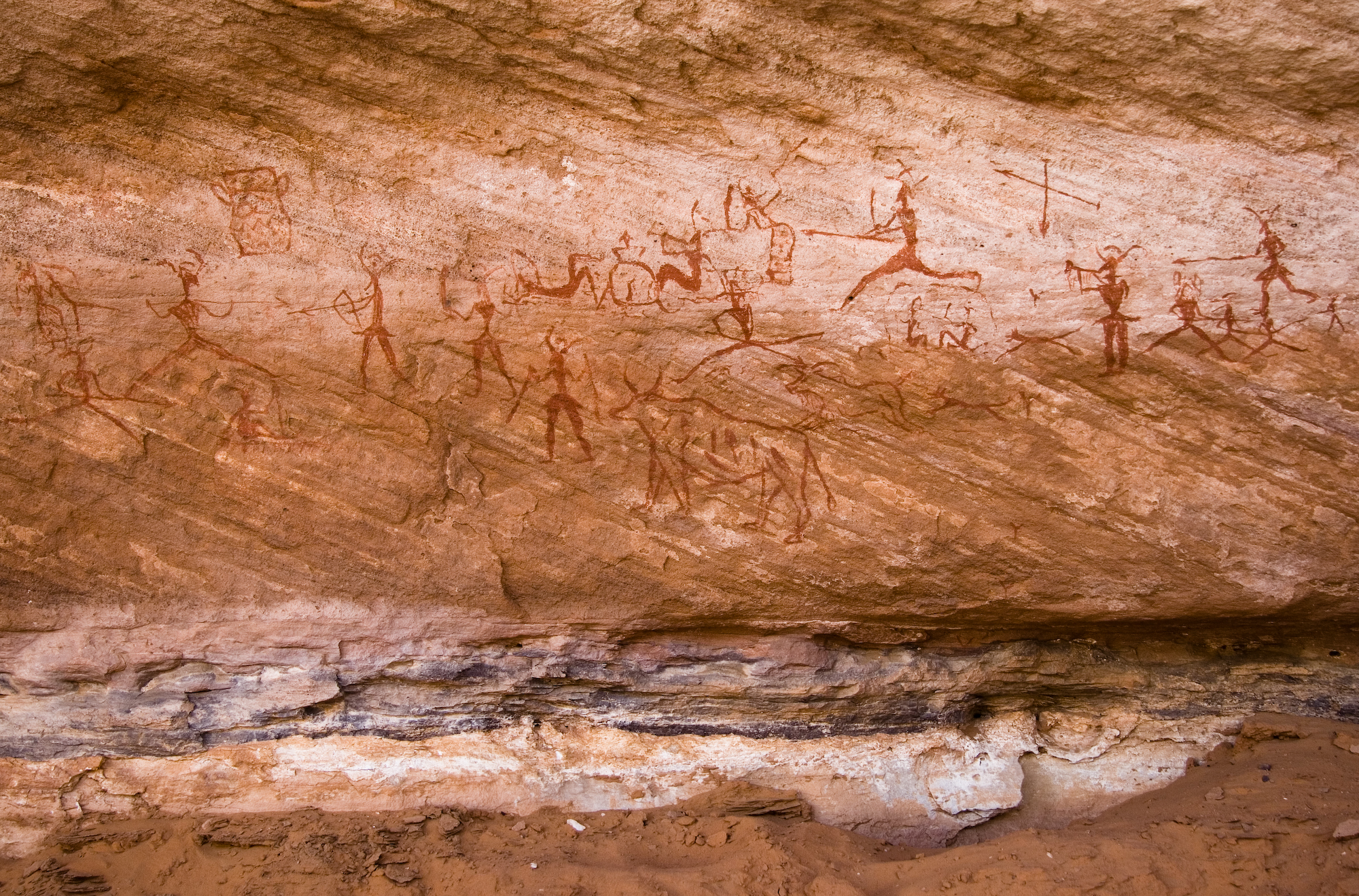
Human and animal figures

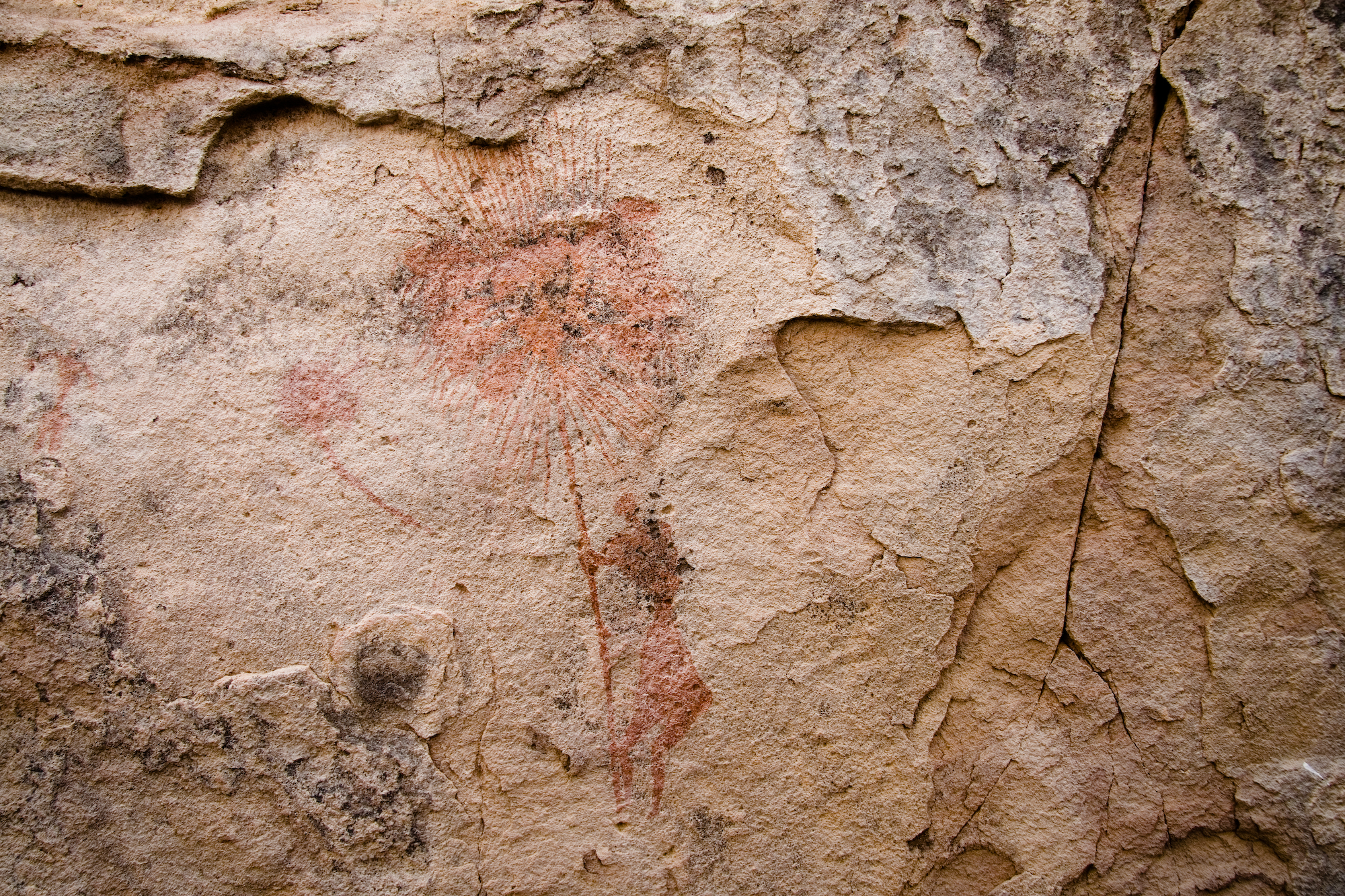
Human figure

=== Milk lipids ===
Tadrart Acacus is also the site of the earliest appearance of processed milk lipids on ceramics, which have been radiocarbon-dated to 7,500 BP.

== Vandalism and destruction since 1969 ==
During Muammar Gaddafi’s rule from 1969 through 2011, the Department of Antiquities was badly neglected. Since 2005, the search for petroleum hidden underground has placed the rock art itself in danger. Seismic hammers are used to send shock waves underneath to locate oil deposits, and have noticeable effects on nearby rocks, including the ones that house the Tadrart Acacus rock art.

Looting of ancient artifacts reached a level of crisis. In response UNESCO called for a major awareness campaign, to heighten awareness of Libya's archaeological and cultural heritage and to alert Libyans that their heritage is "being looted by thieves and destroyed by developers."

In 2012 following the death of Gaddafi, efforts were made to train staff through a $2.26 million UNESCO project, with the Libyan and Italian governments. The project included conservation, protection and education. Along with Tadrart Acacus, Libya has four other UNESCO World Heritage sites: Cyrene, Leptis Magna, Sabratha and Ghadames. UNESCO advised that "a centre should be established at Ghat or Uweynat to train the staff in charge of the protection and management of the property and to host a museum which is expected to play an important [role] in terms of awareness raising."

UNESCO State of Conservation (SOC) reports from 2011, 2012 and 2013 show that at least ten of the rock-art sites have been the object of deliberate and considerable destruction since at least April 2009. The ambiguity surrounding property boundaries of the World Heritage Site and therefore the property management combined with lack of local understanding of its cultural values were contributing factors in the ongoing vandalism. Conflicts in the area since 2011 led to increased vandalism.

In May 2013 UNESCO undertook a technical mission to assess the state of conservation the Tadrart Acacus site and to "build-up a strategic plan to enforce the protection and management of this unique cultural and natural context."

On 14 April 2014 two kinds of vandals were reported, those who thoughtlessly carve their own names beside the ancient rock art and those who deliberately use chemical products to remove the rock drawings. On April 20, 2014, the French special correspondent Jacques-Marie Bourget was informed by a local journalist from Ghat, Libya, Aziz Al-Hachi, that the UNESCO Rock-Art World Heritage Site of Tadrart Acacus was being destroyed with sledgehammers and scrub brushes.

== Art ==
Funeral Ritual in the Acacus, is a painting by Shefa Salem, which inspired by cave art from the Acacus Mountains dating to 4000 BC that featured a boat containing a group of people, one of whom was upside down.

== Geography ==
The Tadrart Acacus have a large variation of landscapes, from different-coloured dunes to arches, gorges, isolated rocks and deep wadis (ravines). Major landmarks include the arches of Afzejare and Tin Khlega. Although this area is one of the most arid in the Sahara, there is vegetation, such as the medicinal Calotropis procera, and there are a number of springs and wells in the mountains.

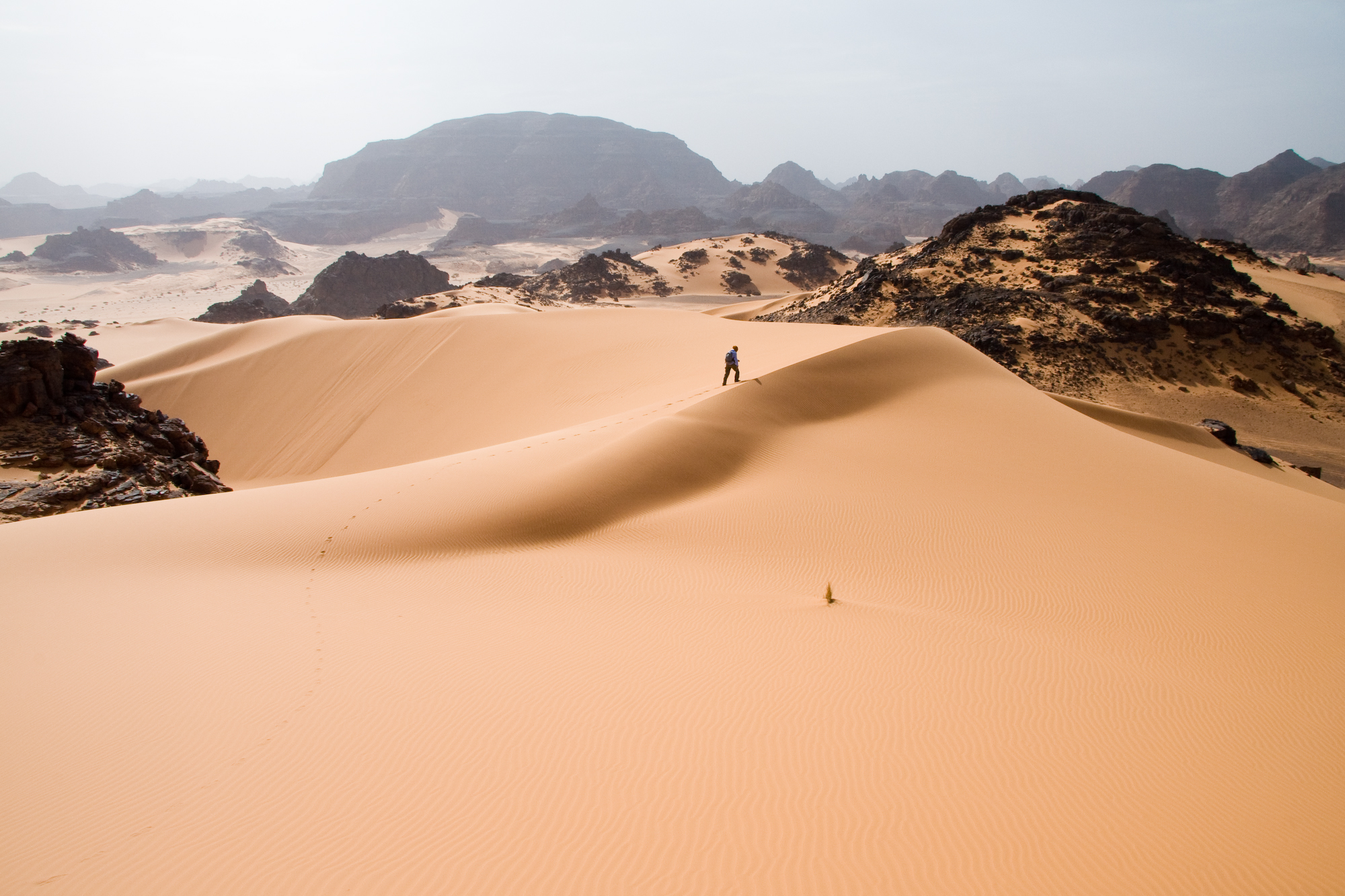
Acacus mountains in western Libya, part of the Sahara

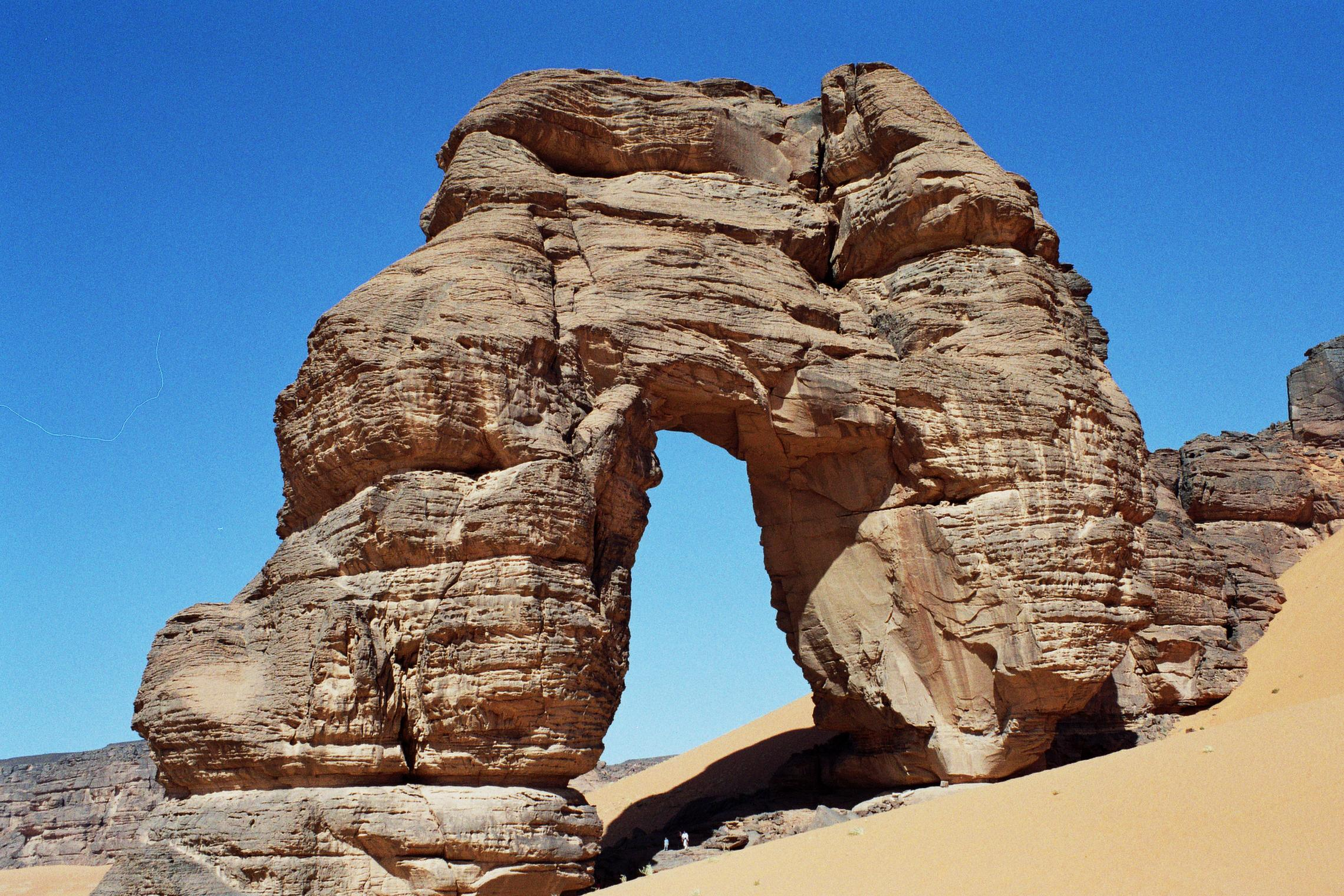
Rock arch in Tadrart Acacus

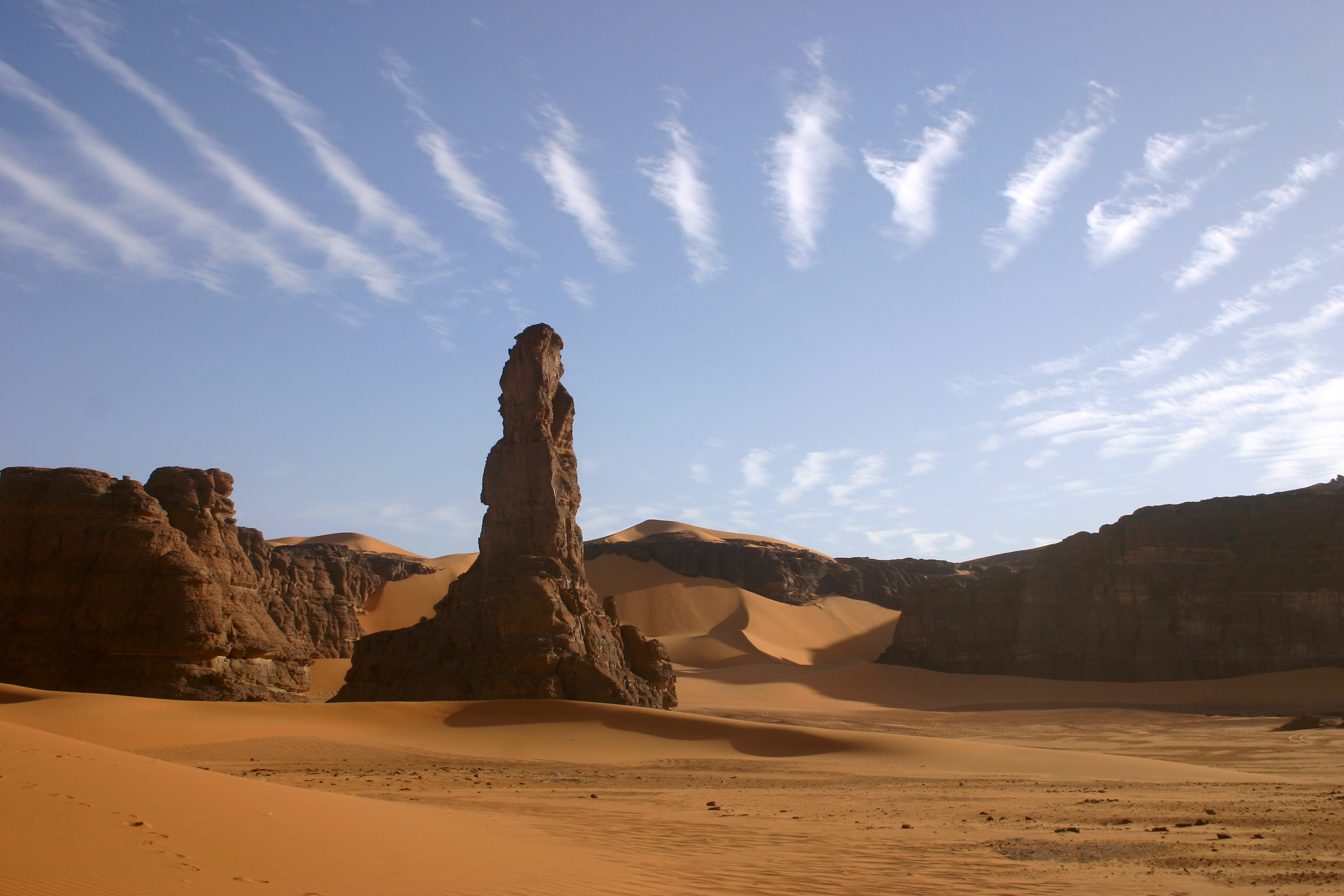
The Moul n'ga Cirque in the Tadrart Rouge region, with wave clouds above

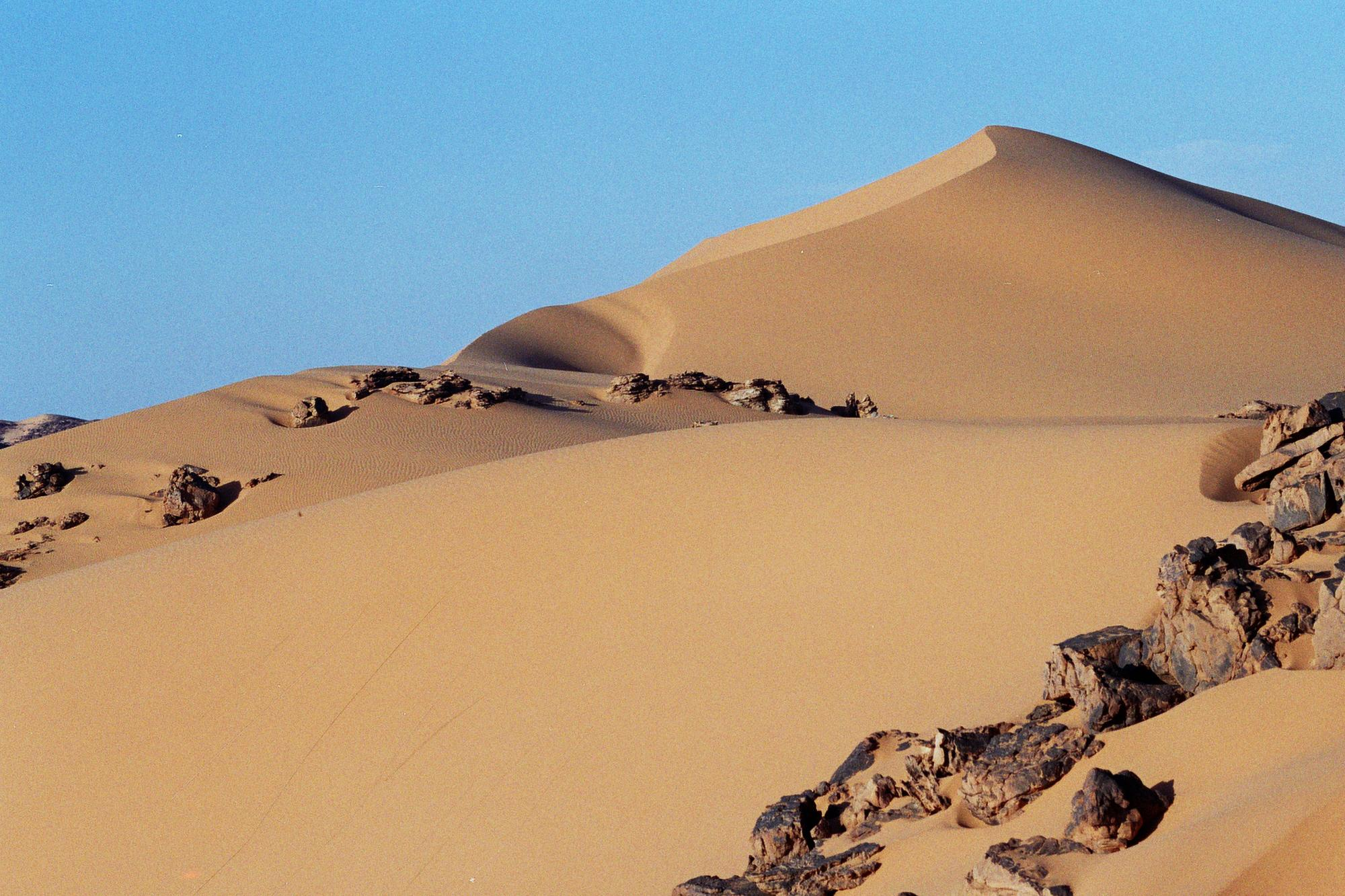
Desert of Akakus

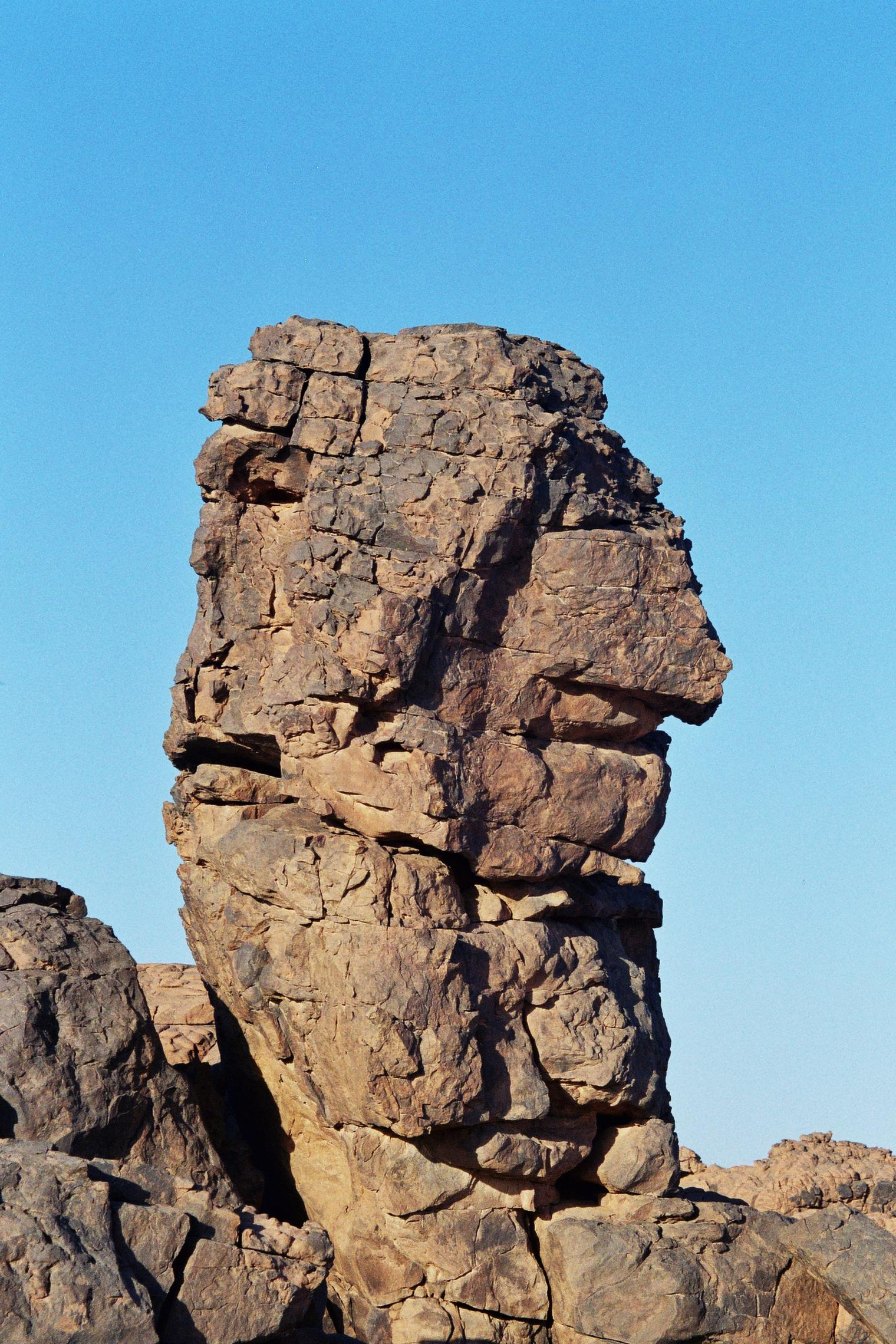
Head rock

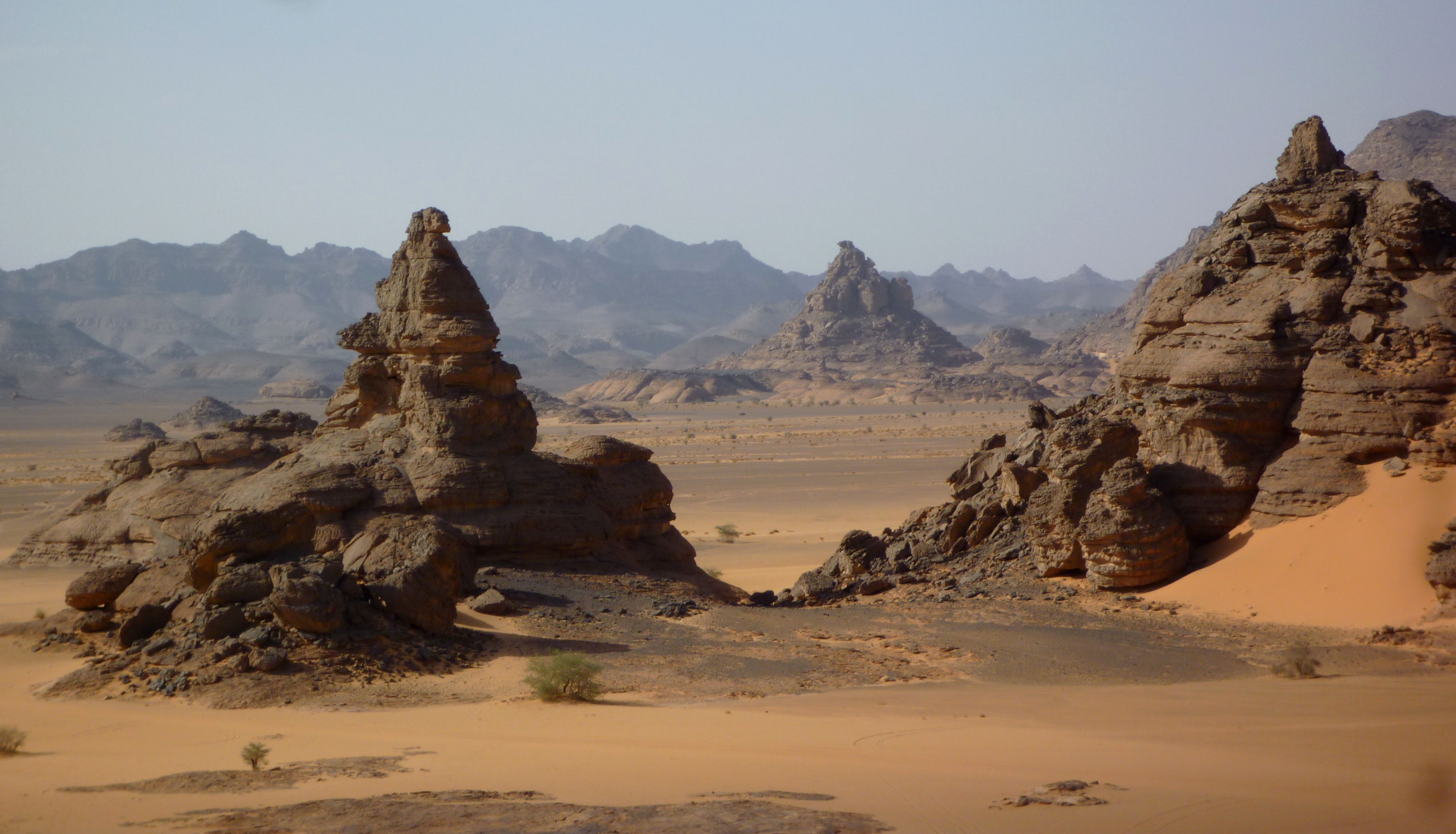
Rock formations

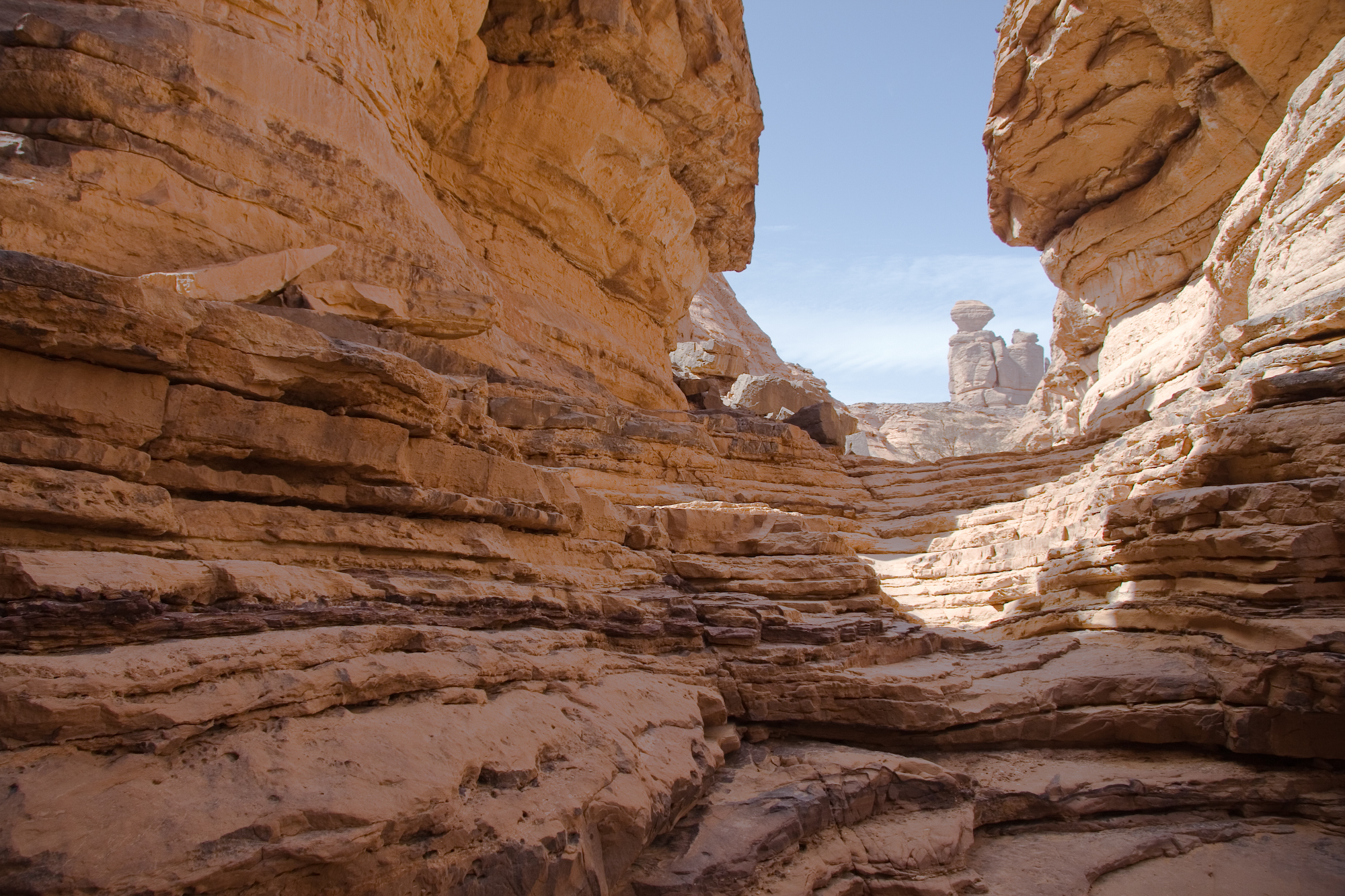
Rock formations

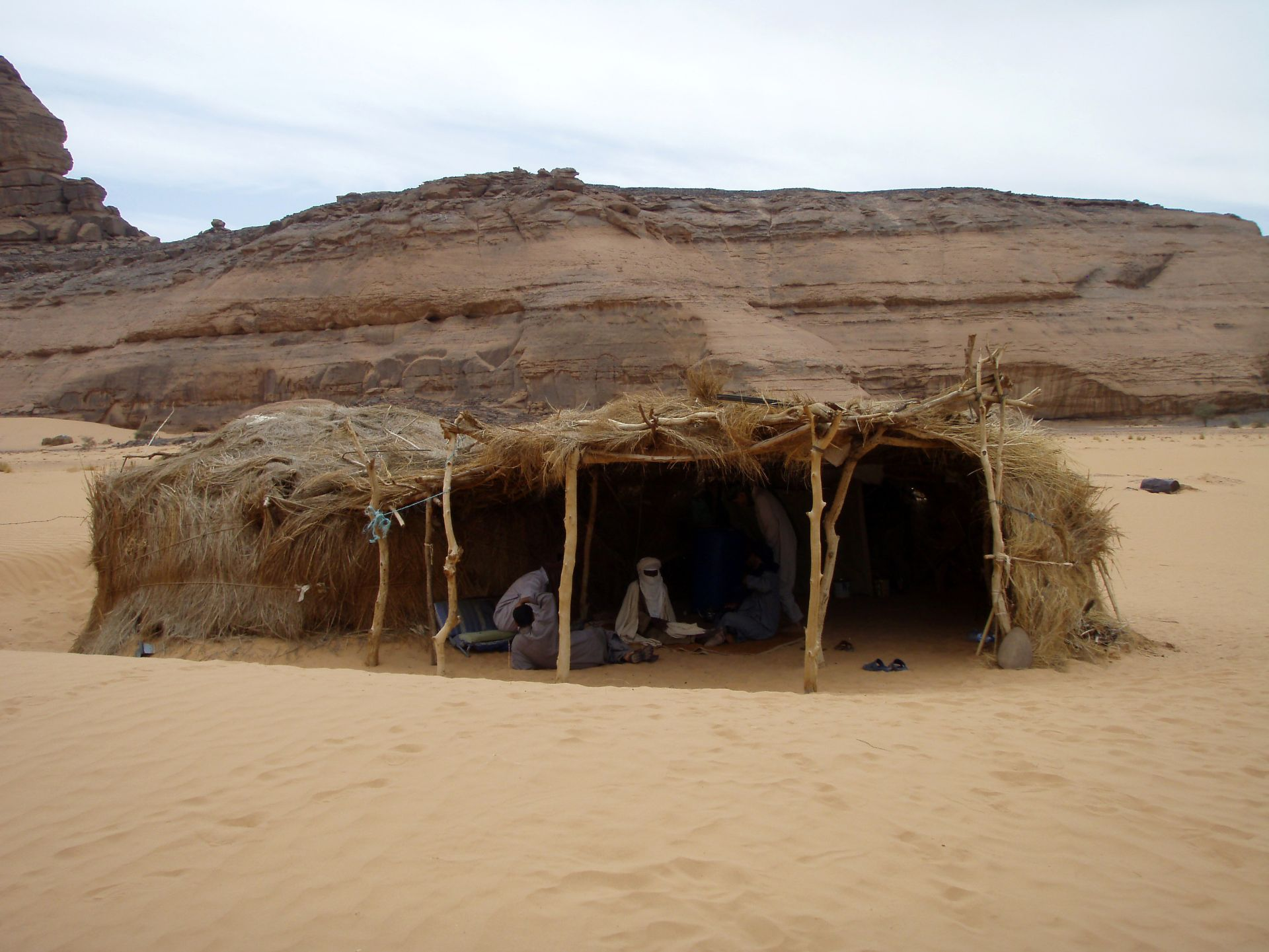
Temporary human-built habitat

== See also ==
- List of Stone Age art
- Uan Muhuggiag
