= Mesak Settafet =

Prehistoric rock art site in Libya

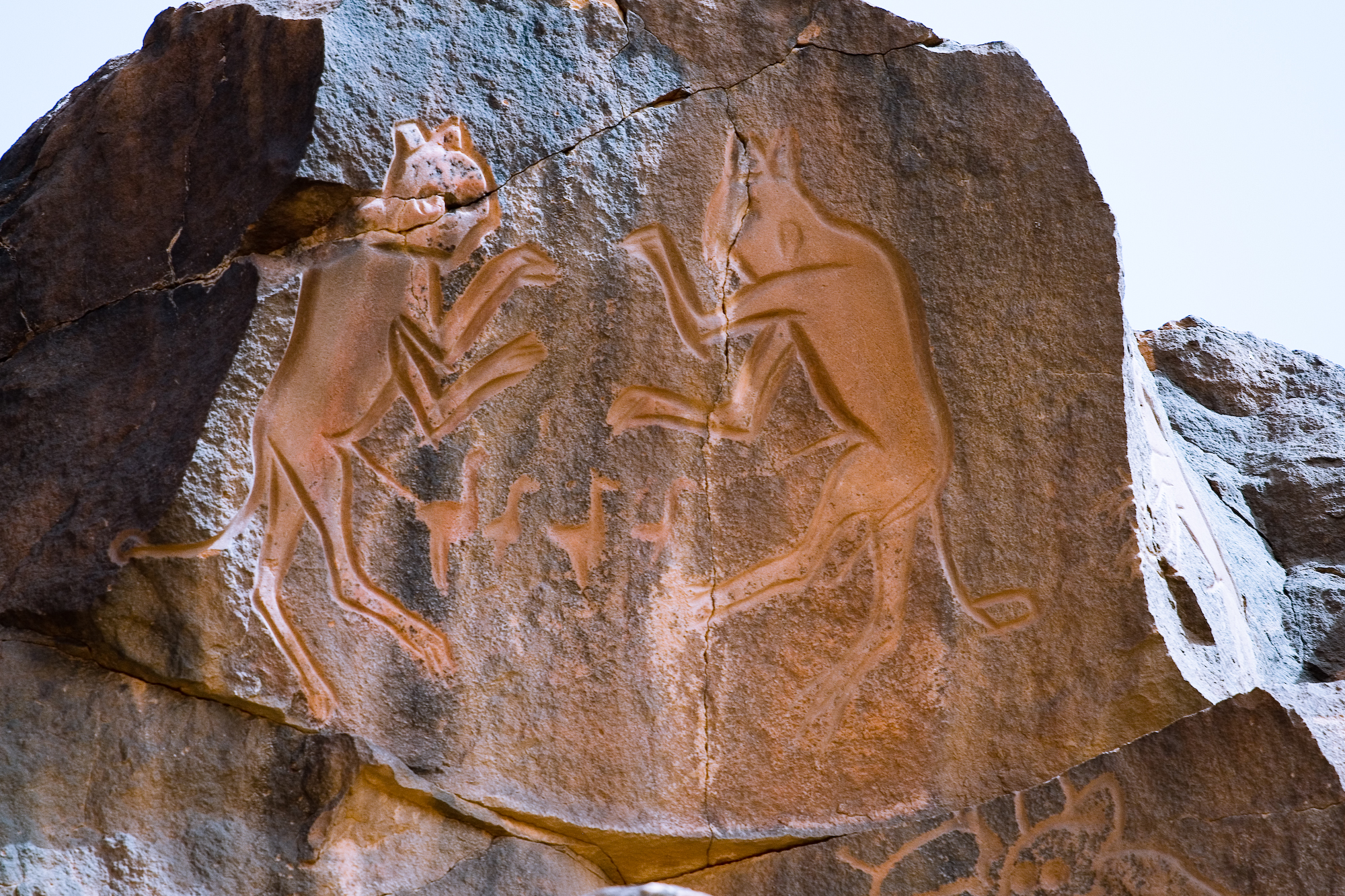
- Meerkat carvings in the Wadi Mathendous in the Mesak Settafet region
- Interactive map of Mesak Settafet
- 25°45′N 11°50′E
- Type: Rock art
- Location: Wadi al Hayaa, Libya

History
- Built: c. 3000 BC

Mesak Settafet is a massive sandstone escarpment in southwest Libya. It sits at an elevation of up to 300 metres (980 ft). The outcropping is abundant in prehistoric rock art and stone tools, particularly at the Wadi Mathendous site.

== Rock art ==
Map of rock art in the Sahara

There are many distinctive and large prehistoric carvings at the Mesak Settafet escarpment, especially at Wadi Mathendous. The outcropping's exposed stones are covered in a dark varnish or patina containing minerals not currently present in the sandstone. The microns-thick patina of iron and manganese oxides were likely laid down on the rock when the area was much wetter, up to 3000 BC. The majority of the rock carvings in the area were probably first scratched then ground, likely with water, to create a purposeful finish.

== Rock tools ==
The Mesak Settafet is littered with stone tools from the Pleistocene and later ages. A 2015 survey of randomly selected areas in the region estimated the tool density to be as high as 75 per square metre (7.0/sq ft) in places. The researchers for the Libyan Department of Antiquities used this figure to call the escarpment the earliest evidence of an anthropogenic environment.
