= Ouallene =

Town in Adrar Province, Algeria

Coordinates: 24°37′N 1°16′E

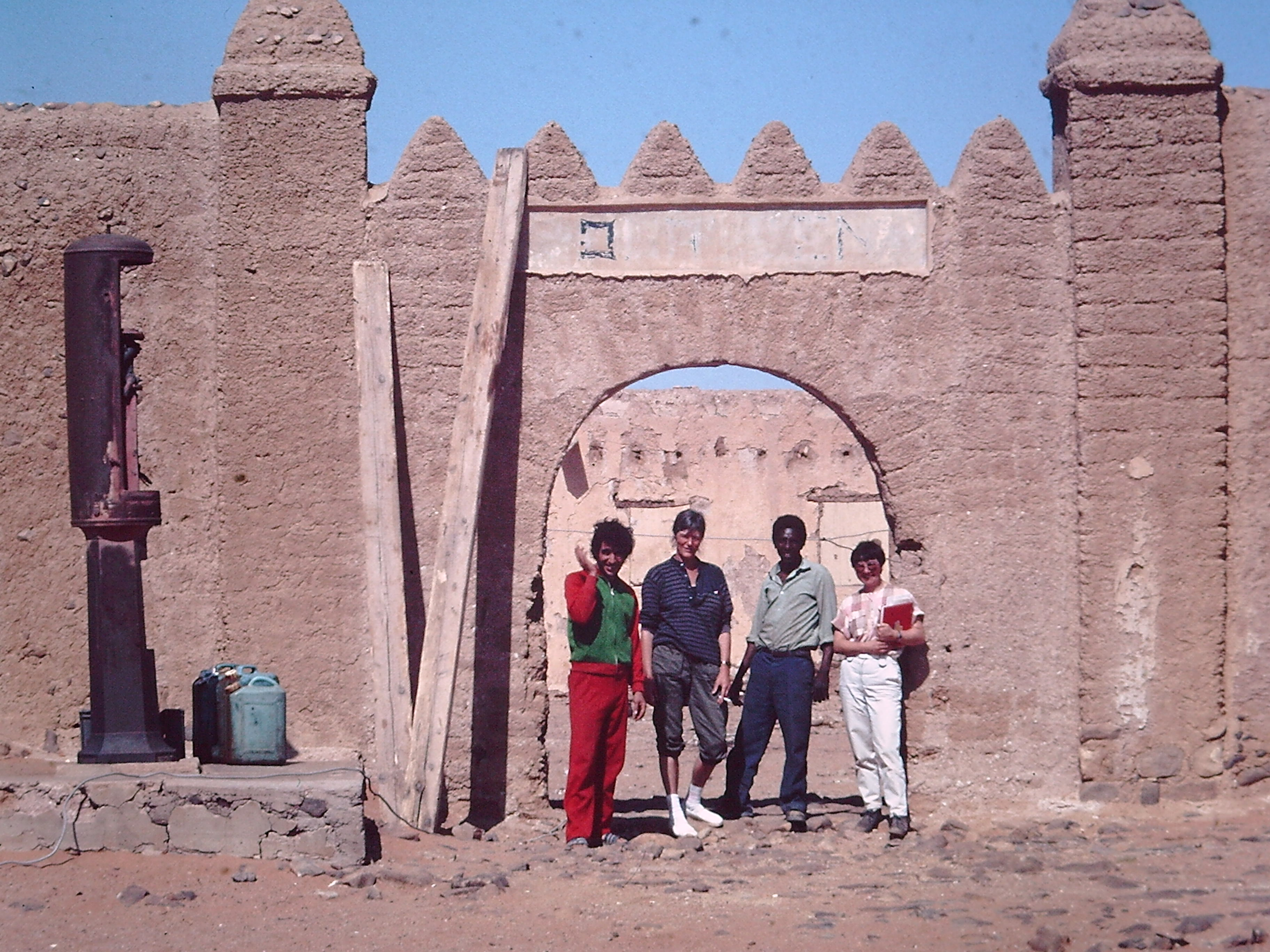
Bordj Ouallen

Ouallene or Ouallen is a desert town and bordj in southern Algeria. The village is located in the Adrar Province to the southeast of Reggane. The bordj sits at an elevation of about 346 m (1,135 ft) above sea level and lies in the heart of the Tanezrouft, one of the hottest and driest regions in the Sahara Desert, the world's largest hot desert.

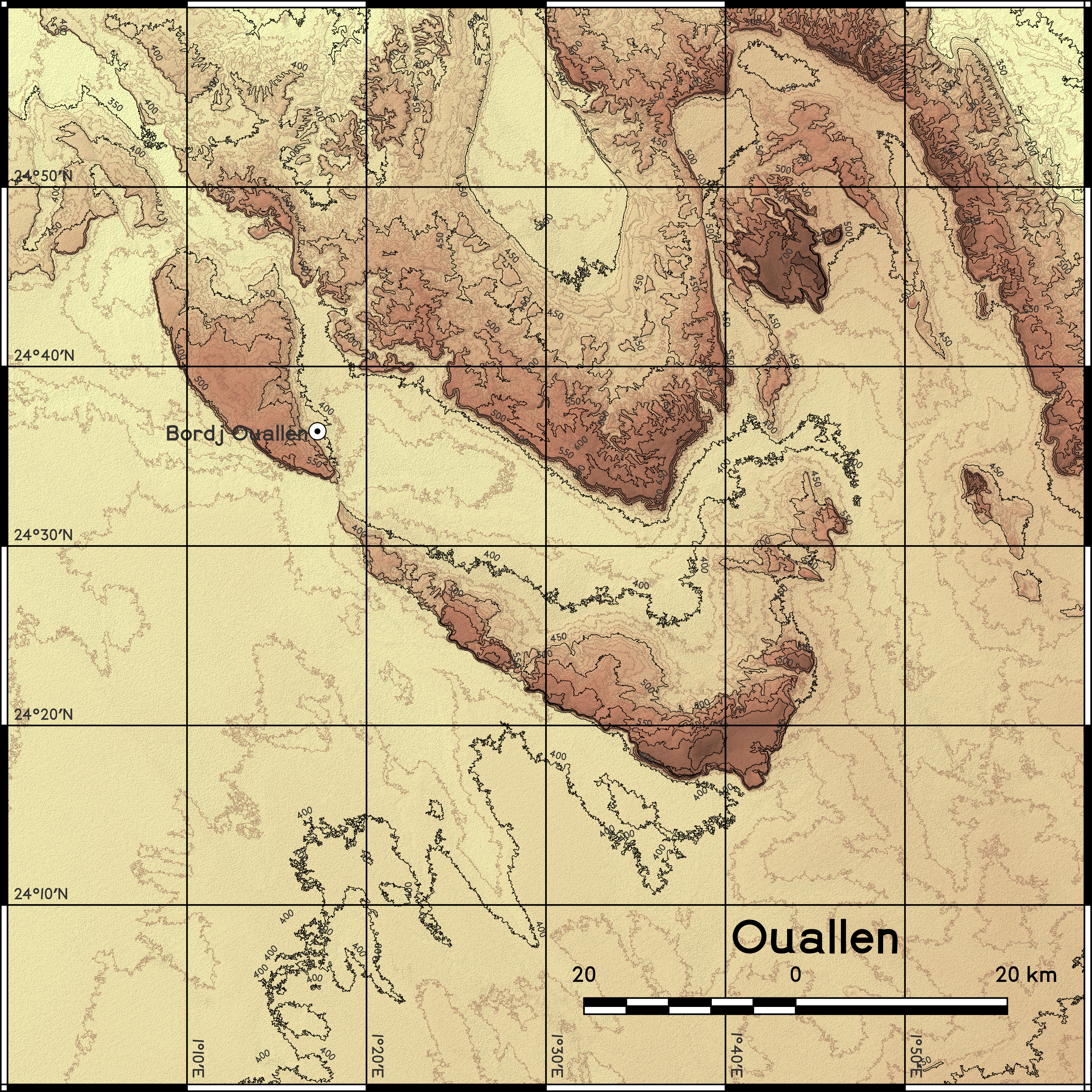
Topographic map of the vicinity of Ouallen / Algeria

== Climate ==
Ouallene has a hot desert climate (Köppen climate classification BWh), with a really long, torrid summer and a brief, very warm winter, and averages just 17 millimetres (0.67 in) of rainfall per year. The excessively sunny, hot, dry climate is marked by very high temperatures and near-zero precipitation all year-long. During many months of the year, highs of 40° are common and from June to August, inclusively, highs are consistently hovering around 45° with lows rarely dropping below 30°. The annual mean temperature exceeds 28° in Ouallene.

Climate data for Ouallene (2010 - 2013)
Month	Jan	Feb	Mar	Apr	May	Jun	Jul	Aug	Sep	Oct	Nov	Dec	Year
Mean daily maximum °C (°F)	24.5 (76.1)	28.3 (82.9)	33.1 (91.6)	36.5 (97.7)	41.0 (105.8)	45.2 (113.4)	45.2 (113.4)	43.9 (111.0)	42.7 (108.9)	36.9 (98.4)	31.6 (88.9)	27.1 (80.8)	36.3 (97.4)
Daily mean °C (°F)	16.0 (60.8)	19.9 (67.8)	24.5 (76.1)	27.9 (82.2)	32.5 (90.5)	36.4 (97.5)	37.6 (99.7)	36.7 (98.1)	34.9 (94.8)	29.7 (85.5)	23.1 (73.6)	18.6 (65.5)	28.2 (82.7)
Mean daily minimum °C (°F)	7.7 (45.9)	11.2 (52.2)	15.9 (60.6)	19.3 (66.7)	24.0 (75.2)	27.9 (82.2)	30.1 (86.2)	29.6 (85.3)	27.0 (80.6)	22.4 (72.3)	14.6 (58.3)	9.8 (49.6)	20.0 (67.9)
Average precipitation mm (inches)	3.0 (0.12)	1.0 (0.04)	0.0 (0.0)	0.0 (0.0)	0.3 (0.01)	0.3 (0.01)	2.0 (0.08)	9.5 (0.37)	1.0 (0.04)	0.3 (0.01)	0.0 (0.0)	0.0 (0.0)	17.4 (0.68)
Source: Global climatology for Ouallene, Algeria (2010 - 2013)
