= North Africa =

Northernmost region of Africa

- Area: 7,862,221 km^{2} (3,035,620 sq mi)
- Population: ▲270,538,625 (2026)
- Countries: Sovereign states (7): Algeria; Egypt; Libya (GNU); Mauritania (sometimes excluded); Morocco; Sudan (sometimes excluded); Tunisia; Partially recognized states (1): Sahrawi Arab Democratic Republic (Western Sahara) (Note: In 1976, Spain withdrew from Western Sahara and informed the Secretary-General of the United Nations that it no longer considers itself responsible for the territory. Nonetheless, the criminal division of the Spanish National High Court ruled in 2014 that Spain remains as Western Sahara's de jure administering power.)
- Dependencies: Territories of European states (5): Italy; • Lampedusa e Linosa; Portugal; • Madeira; Spain; • Alboran Island; • Canary Islands; • Plazas de soberanía; • Ceuta; • Melilla
- Non-UN states: Quasi-states and rival governments (4): Government of National Stability; Government of Peace and Unity; New Sudan; Liberated Areas
- Time zones: UTC+00:00; UTC+01:00; UTC+02:00

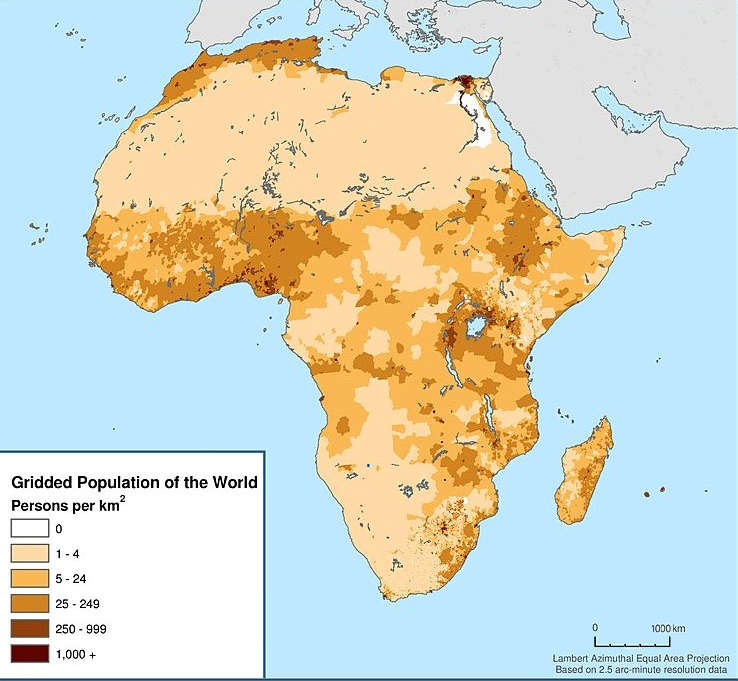
The population density of Africa as of 2000

North Africa, also known as Northern Africa, is a region encompassing the northern portion of the African continent. There is no singularly accepted scope for the region. However, it is sometimes defined as stretching from the Atlantic shores of the Western Sahara in the west, to Egypt and Sudan's Red Sea coast in the east.

The most common definition for the region's boundaries includes Algeria, Egypt, Libya, Morocco, Tunisia, and Western Sahara, the territory disputed between Morocco and the partially recognized Sahrawi Arab Democratic Republic. The United Nations’ definition includes all these countries as well as Sudan. The African Union defines the region similarly, only differing from the UN in excluding the Sudan and including Mauritania. The Sahel, south of the Sahara Desert, can be considered as the southern boundary of North Africa. North Africa includes the Spanish cities of Ceuta and Melilla, and the plazas de soberanía. It can also be considered to include Malta, as well as other Italian, Portuguese, and Spanish regions such as Lampedusa and Lampione, Madeira, and the Canary Islands, which are all either closer to the African continent than Europe or as close to the African continent as Europe.

Northwest Africa has been inhabited by Berbers since the beginning of recorded history, while the eastern part of North Africa has been home to the Ancient Egyptians and Nubians. In the seventh and eighth centuries, Arabs from the Arabian Peninsula swept across the region during the early Muslim conquests. The Arab migrations to the Maghreb began immediately after, which started a long process of Islamization and Arabization that has altered the demographic breakdown of the region and defined the cultural landscape of North Africa ever since. Many, but not all, Berbers, Egyptians, and Nubians gradually converted to Islam and gradually merged into the Arab-Islamic culture, and today, Arabs constitute the majority of the population in all North African countries.

The countries and people of North Africa share a large amount of their genetic, ethnic, cultural and linguistic identity and influence with the Middle East/West Asia, East Africa and the Sahara. A process that began with the Neolithic Revolution c. 10,000 BC and pre-dynastic Egypt. The countries of North Africa are also a major part of the Arab world. The Islamic and Arab influence in North Africa has remained dominant ever since, with the region being integral in the Muslim world. North Africa is associated with the Middle East in the realm of geopolitics to form the Middle East-North Africa region.

== Countries and territories ==
Countries and territories	Area (km^{2})	Population	Population density (per km^{2})	Capital	GDP (nominal) (US$ billions)	GDP (nominal) per capita (US$)	Currency	Government	Official languages
Algeria	2,381,741	47,400,000	20	Algiers	$317.173	$6,691	Algerian dinar	Presidential republic	Arabic and Berber (both official), French is commonly used
Egypt	1,010,408	108,613,296	107	Cairo	$429.645	$3,956	Egyptian pound	Semi-presidential republic	Arabic
Libya	1,759,541	7,459,000	4	Tripoli	$52.453	$7,032	Libyan dinar	United Nations Interim Democratic provisional authority	Arabic
Morocco	446,550 (undisputed), ~710,881 (claimed)	36,828,330	82	Rabat	$194.333	$5,277	Moroccan dirham	Constitutional monarchy	Arabic and Berber (both official), French is commonly used
Sudan	1,886,068	51,662,000	27	Khartoum	$44.688	$865	Sudanese pound	Federal republic under a military junta	Arabic and English (both official)
Tunisia	163,610	11,972,169	73	Tunis	$60.745	$5,074	Tunisian dinar	Parliamentary republic	Arabic, French is commonly used.
Western Sahara / Sahrawi Arab Democratic Republic	266,000 (total land area, control is split between Morocco and the SADR)	600,904	2	disputed	disputed	disputed	disputed	disputed	Disputed: commonly Arabic and French (Moroccan zone); commonly Arabic and Spanish (SADR zone)

== History ==
=== Prehistory ===
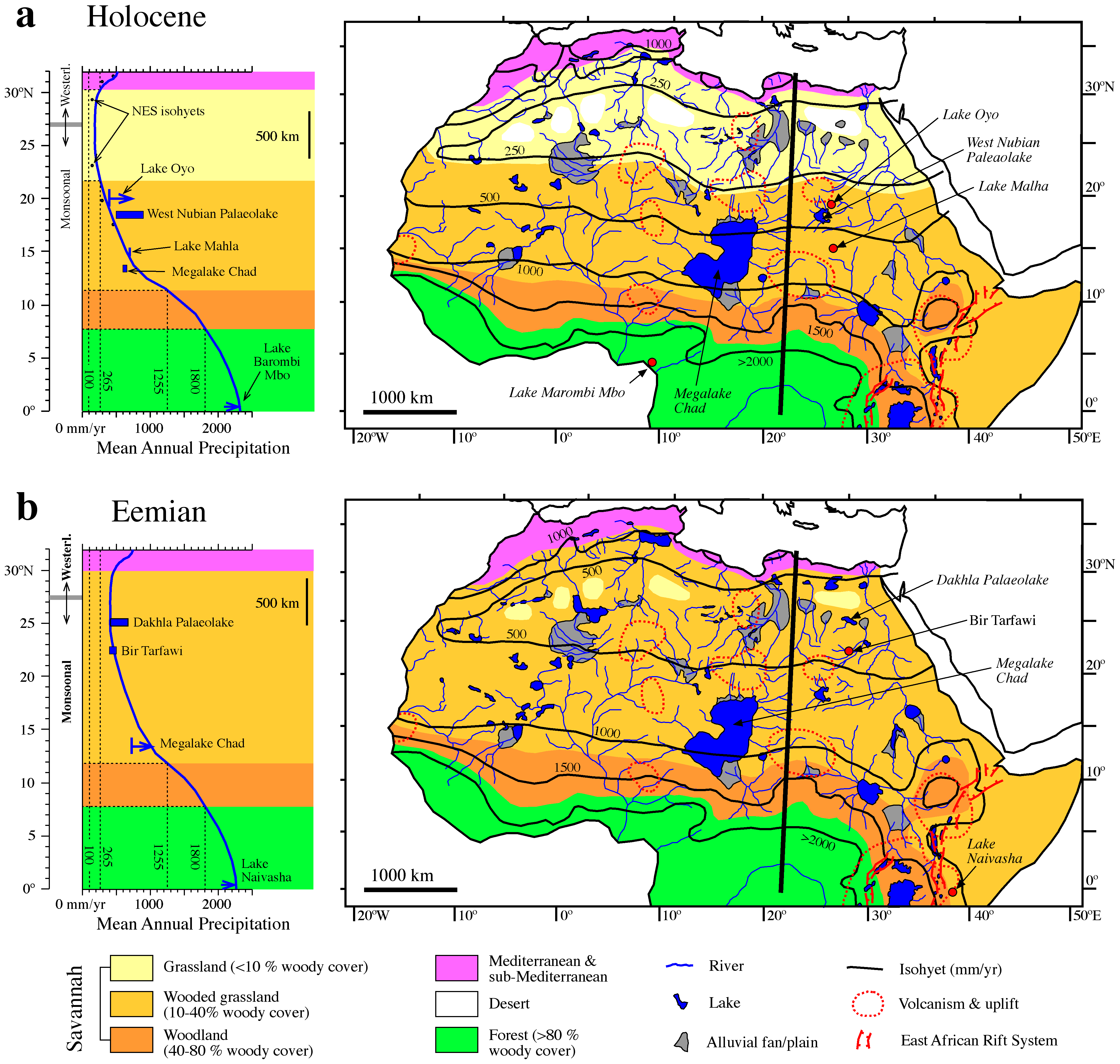
Vegetation and water bodies in early Holocene (top), between about 12,000 and 7,000 years ago, and Eemian (bottom)

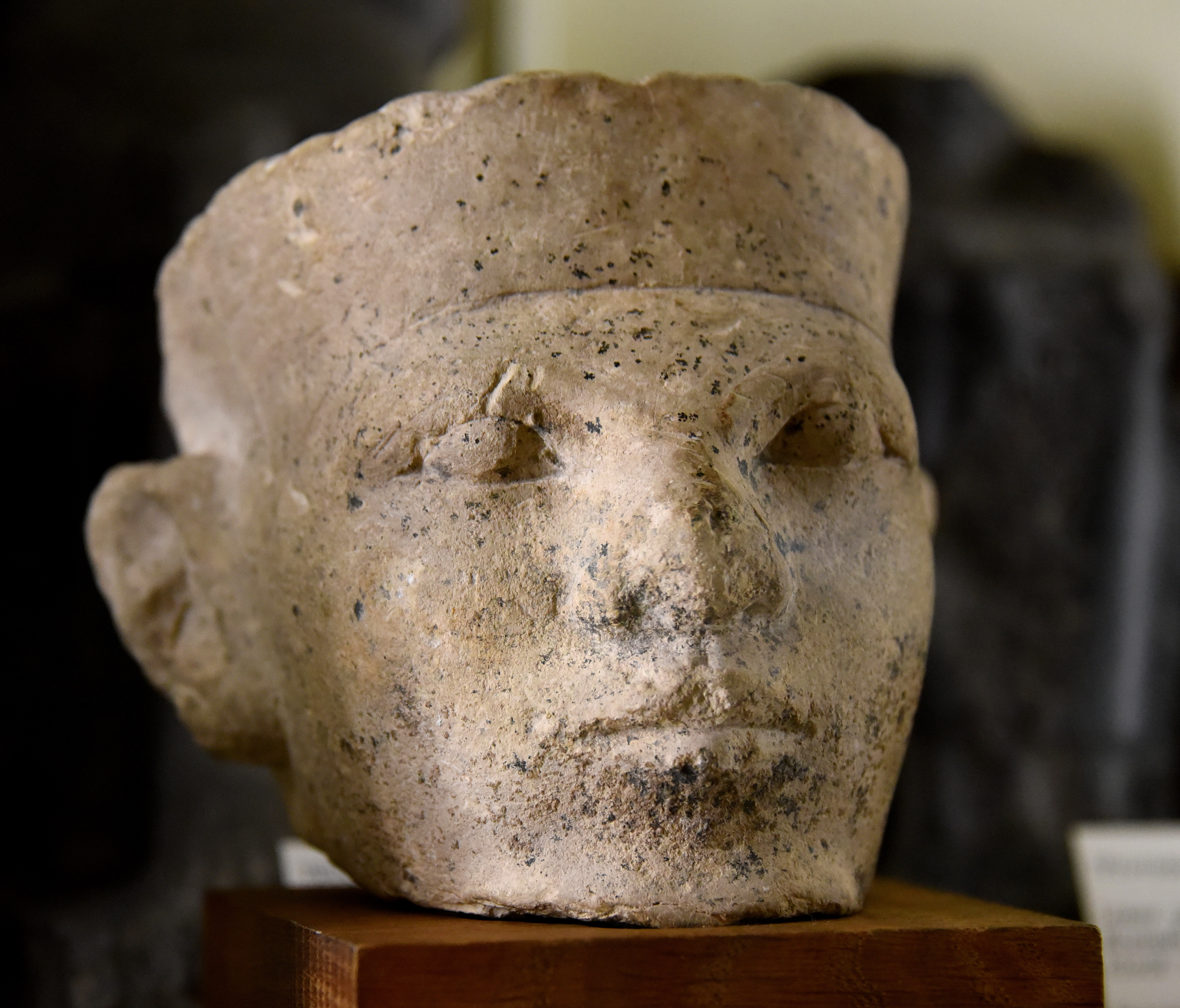
Limestone head of an early Egyptian king, The Petrie Museum. Modern scholars have considered the stone bust to depict an Early Dynastic or Old Kingdom pharaoh.

Due to the recent African origin of modern humans, the history of Prehistoric North Africa is important to the understanding of pre-hominid and early modern human history in Africa. Some researchers have postulated that North Africa rather than East Africa served as the exit point for the modern humans who first trekked out of the continent in the Out of Africa migration.

The earliest inhabitants of central North Africa have left behind significant remains: early remnants of hominid occupation in North Africa, for example, were found in Ain-Hnech in Setif dating back 2.6 million years, near Saïda (c. 200,000 BCE); in fact, more recent investigations have found signs of Oldowan technology there, and indicate a date of up to 1.8 million BCE.

Recent finds in Jebel Irhoud in Morocco have been found to contain some of the oldest Homo sapiens remains; This suggests that, rather than arising only in East Africa around 200,000 years ago, early Homo sapiens may already have been present across the length of Africa 100,000 years earlier. According to study author Jean-Jacques Hublin, "The idea is that early Homo sapiens dispersed around the continent and elements of human modernity appeared in different places, and so different parts of Africa contributed to the emergence of what we call modern humans today." Early humans may have comprised a large, interbreeding population dispersed across Africa whose spread was facilitated by a wetter climate that created a "green Sahara", around 330,000 to 300,000 years ago. The rise of modern humans may thus have taken place on a continental scale rather than being confined to a particular corner of Africa. In September 2019, scientists reported the computerized determination, based on 260 CT scans, of a virtual skull shape of the last common human ancestor to modern humans/H. sapiens, representative of the earliest modern humans, and suggested that modern humans arose between 260,000 and 350,000 years ago through a merging of populations in East and Southern Africa.

The cave paintings found at Tassili n'Ajjer, north of Tamanrasset, Algeria, and at other locations depict vibrant and vivid scenes of everyday life in central North Africa during the Neolithic Subpluvial period (about 8000 to 4000 BCE). Some parts of North Africa began to participate in the Neolithic revolution in the 6th millennium BCE, just before the rapid desertification of the Sahara around 3500 B.C. largely due to a tilt in the Earth's orbit. It was during this period that domesticated plants and animals were introduced in the region, spreading from the north and east to the southwest. There has been an inferred connection between areas of rapid drying and the introduction of livestock in which the natural (orbital) aridification was amplified by the spread of shrubs and open land due to grazing. Nevertheless, changes in northern Africa's ecology after 3500 BCE provided the backdrop for the formation of dynastic civilizations and the construction of monumental architecture such as the Pyramids of Giza.

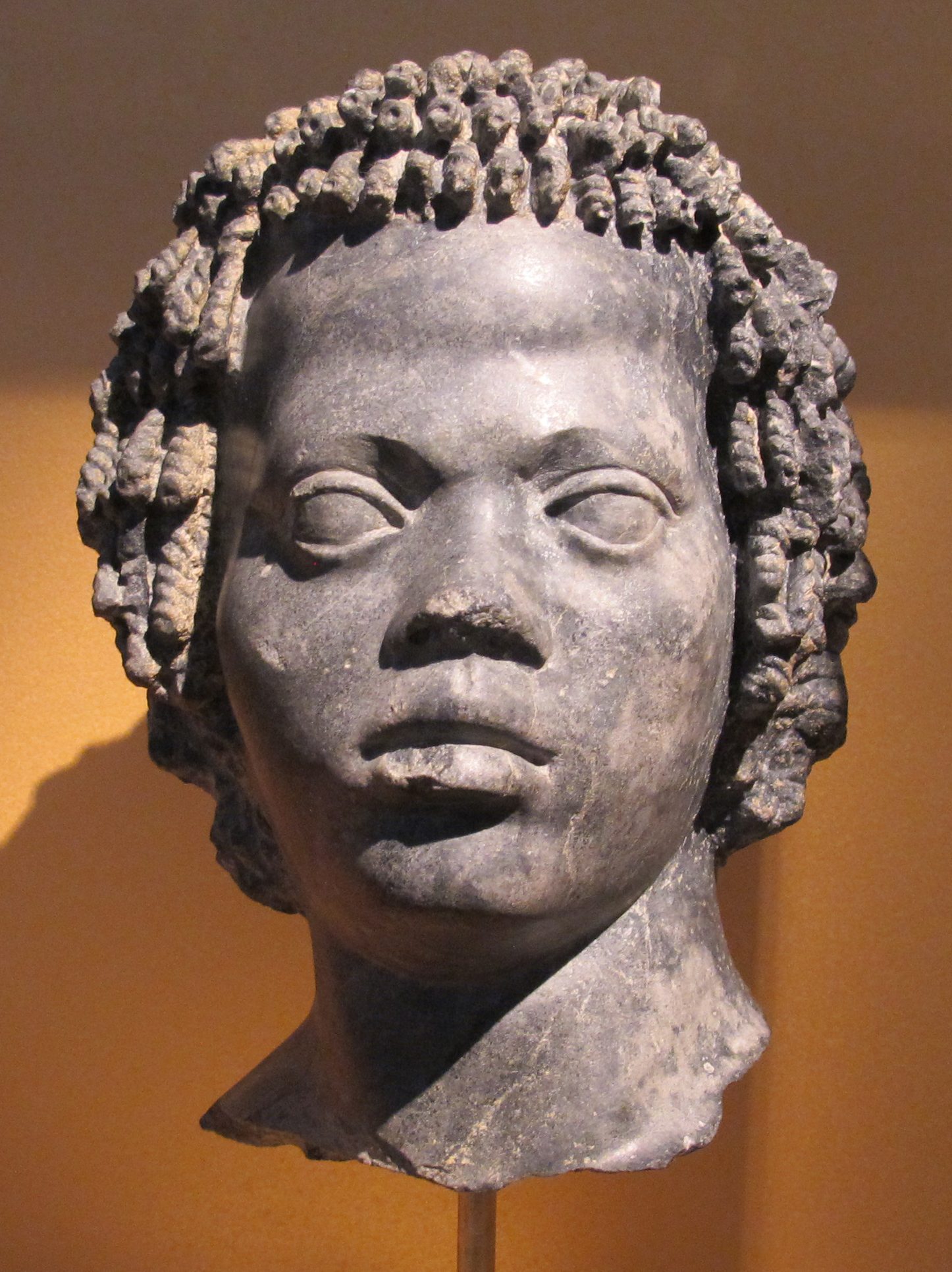
Marble portrait of a Nubia denizen c. 120–100 BC.

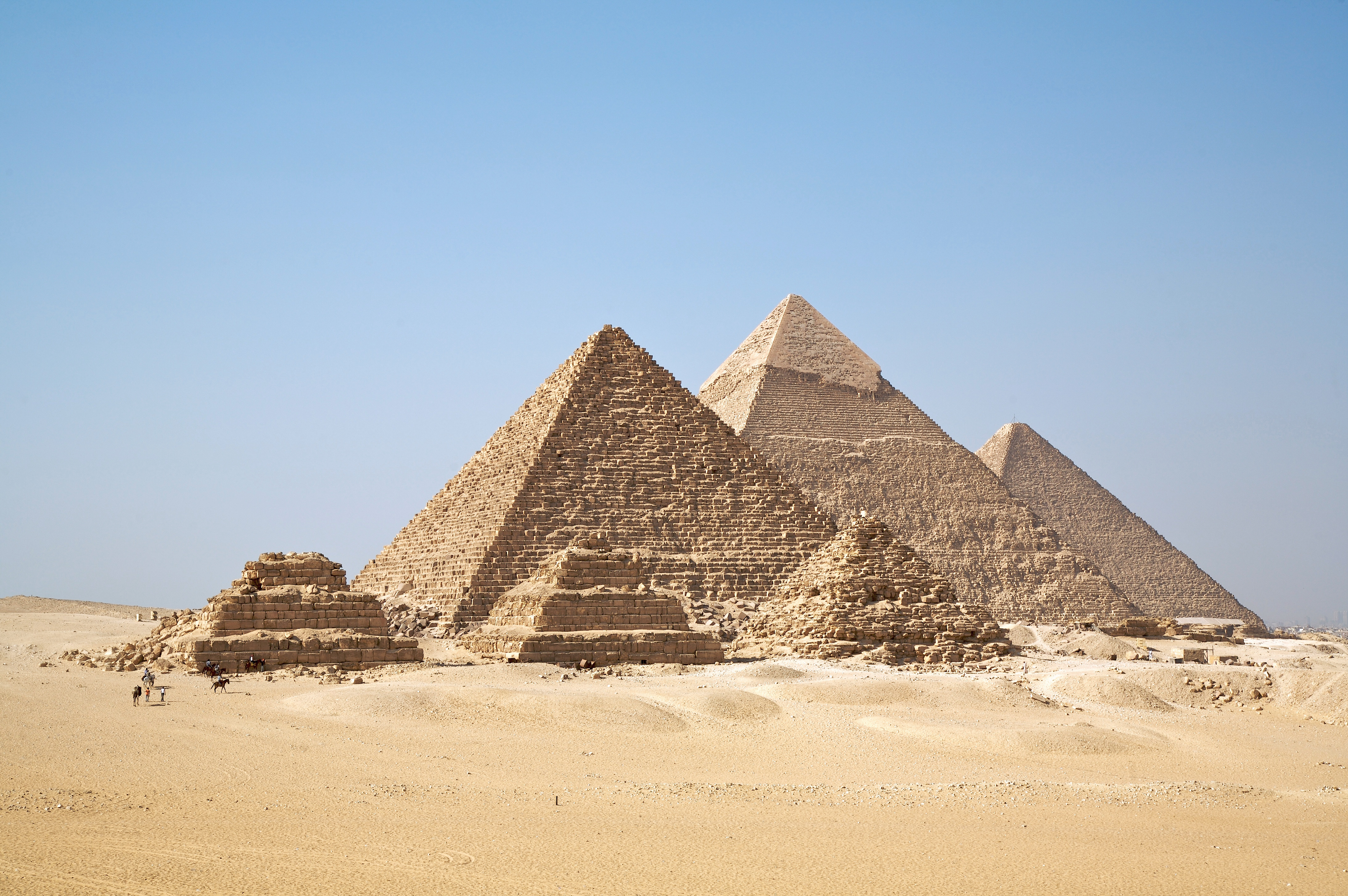
The pyramids of Giza are among the most recognizable symbols of ancient Egyptian civilization.

Archaeological evidence has attested that population settlements occurred in Nubia as early as the Late Pleistocene era and from the 5th millennium BC onwards, whereas there is "no or scanty evidence" of human presence in the Egyptian Nile Valley during these periods, which may be due to problems in site preservation. Several scholars have argued that the African origins of the Egyptian civilisation derived from pastoral communities which emerged in both the Egyptian and Sudanese regions of the Nile Valley in the fifth millennium BCE.

When Egypt entered the Bronze Age, the Maghreb remained focused on small-scale subsistence in small, highly mobile groups. Some Phoenician and Greek colonies were established along the Mediterranean coast during the 7th century BCE.

=== Antiquity and ancient Rome ===
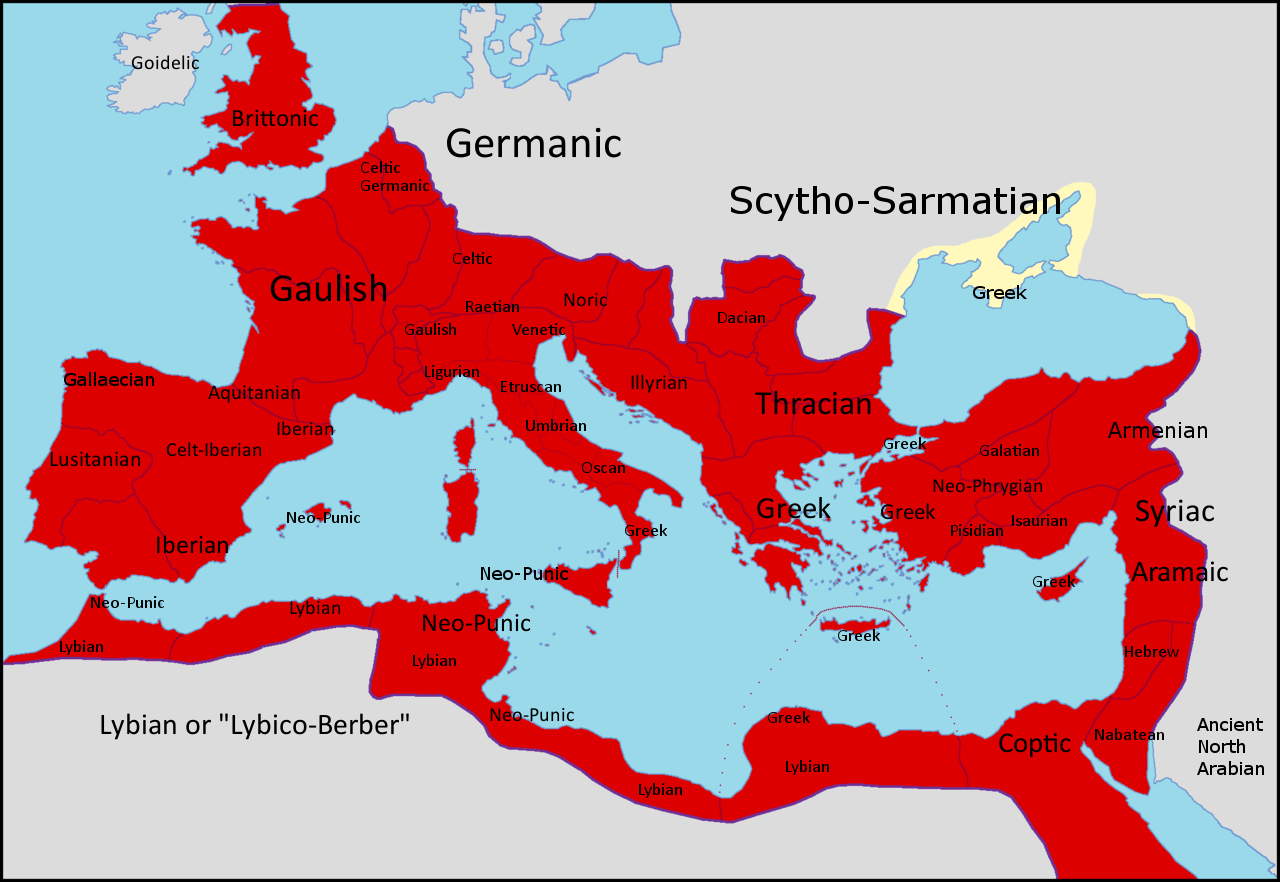
Map of the regional languages of the Roman Empire c. 150 AD

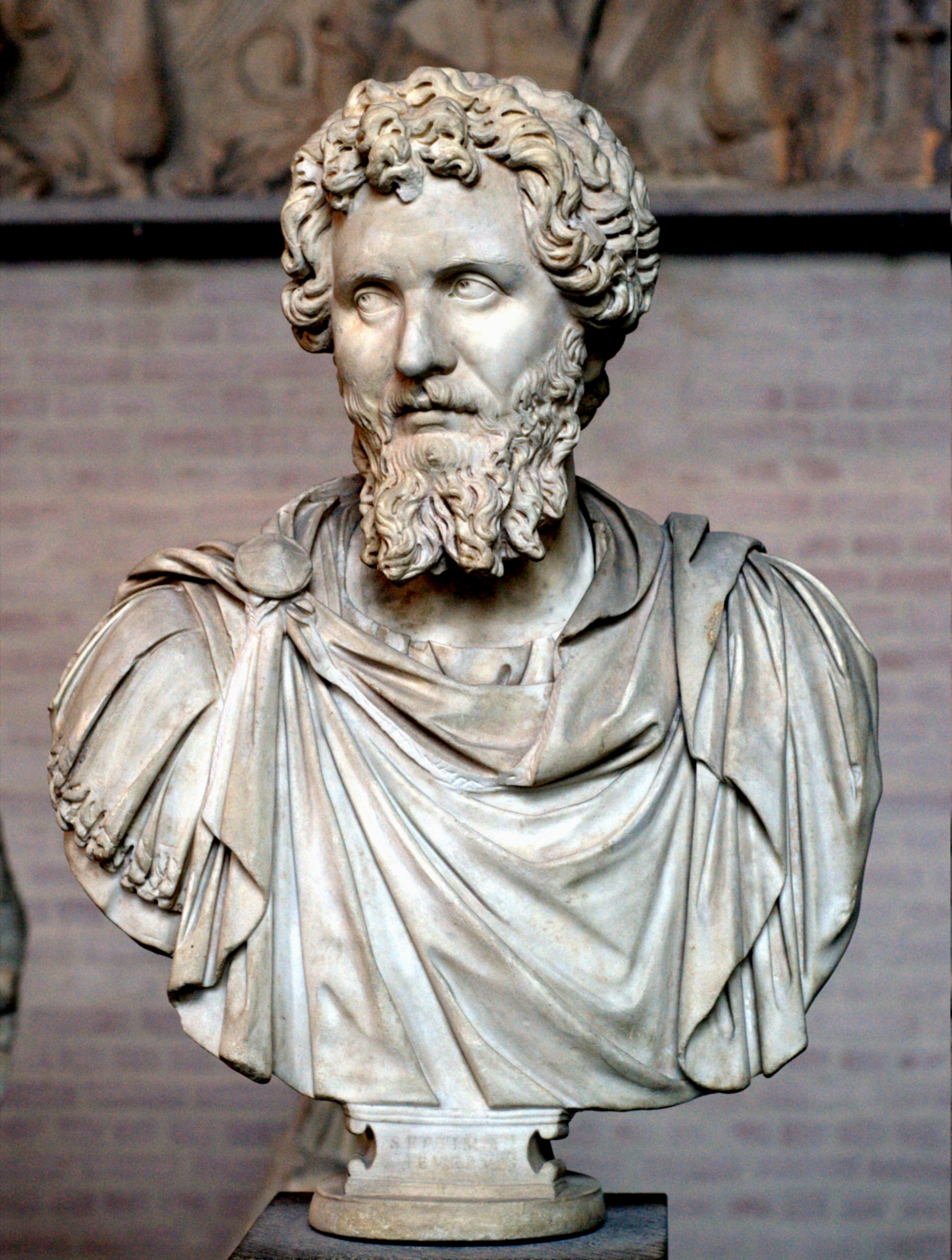
Septimius Severus, the first Roman emperor native to North Africa, born in Leptis Magna, Roman Libya

The most notable nations of antiquity in western North Africa are Carthage, Numidia and Mauretania. The Phoenicians colonized much of North Africa including Carthage and parts of present-day Morocco (including Chellah, Essaouira and Volubilis). The Carthaginians were of Phoenician origin, with the Roman myth of their origin being that Dido, a Phoenician princess, was granted land by a local ruler based on how much land she could cover with a piece of cowhide. She ingeniously devised a method to extend the cowhide to a high proportion, thus gaining a large territory. She was also rejected by the Trojan prince Aeneas according to Virgil, thus creating a historical enmity between Carthage and Rome, as Aeneas would eventually lay the foundations for Rome. The Carthaginian Empire was a commercial power and had a strong navy, but relied on mercenaries for land soldiers. The Carthaginians developed an empire in the Iberian Peninsula, Malta, Sardinia, Corsica and northwest Sicily, the latter being the cause of First Punic War with the Romans.

Over a hundred years and more, all Carthaginian territory was eventually conquered by the Romans, resulting in the Carthaginian North African territories becoming the Roman province of Africa in 146 B.C. This led to tension and eventually conflict between Numidia and Rome. The Numidian wars are notable for launching the careers of both Gaius Marius, and Sulla, and stretching the constitutional burden of the Roman republic as Marius required a professional army, something previously contrary to Roman values, to overcome the talented military leader Jugurtha. Kingdom of Mauretania remained independent until being annexed to the Roman Empire by Emperor Claudius in 42 AD.

North Africa remained a part of the Roman Empire, producing notable citizens, including Augustine of Hippo and Macrinus, until incompetent leadership from Roman commanders in the early fifth century allowed the Germanic peoples, the Vandals, to cross the Strait of Gibraltar, whereupon they overcame the fickle Roman defense. The loss of North Africa is considered a pinnacle point in the fall of the Western Roman Empire as Africa had previously been an important grain province that maintained Roman prosperity despite the barbarian incursions, and the wealth required to create new armies. The issue of regaining North Africa became paramount to the Western Empire, but was frustrated by Vandal victories. The focus of Roman energy had to be on the emerging threat of the Huns. In 468 AD, the Romans made one last serious attempt to invade North Africa but were repelled. This perhaps marks the point of terminal decline for the Western Roman Empire.

The last Roman emperor was deposed in 476 by the Heruli general Odoacer. Trade routes between Europe and North Africa remained intact until the coming of Islam. Some Berbers were members of the Early African Church (but evolved their own Donatist doctrine), some were Berber Jews, and some adhered to traditional Berber religion. African pope Victor I served during the reign of Roman emperor Septimius Severus. Furthermore, during the rule of the Romans, Byzantines, Vandals, Ottomans and Carthaginians the Kabyle people were the only or one of the few in North Africa who remained independent.

The Kabyle people were incredibly resistible so much so that even during the Arab conquest of North Africa they still had control and possession over their mountains.

With Roman control of Lower Egypt, the Romans failed to conquer the Nubian kingdom and had been forced into a peace treaty.

=== Arab conquest to modern times ===
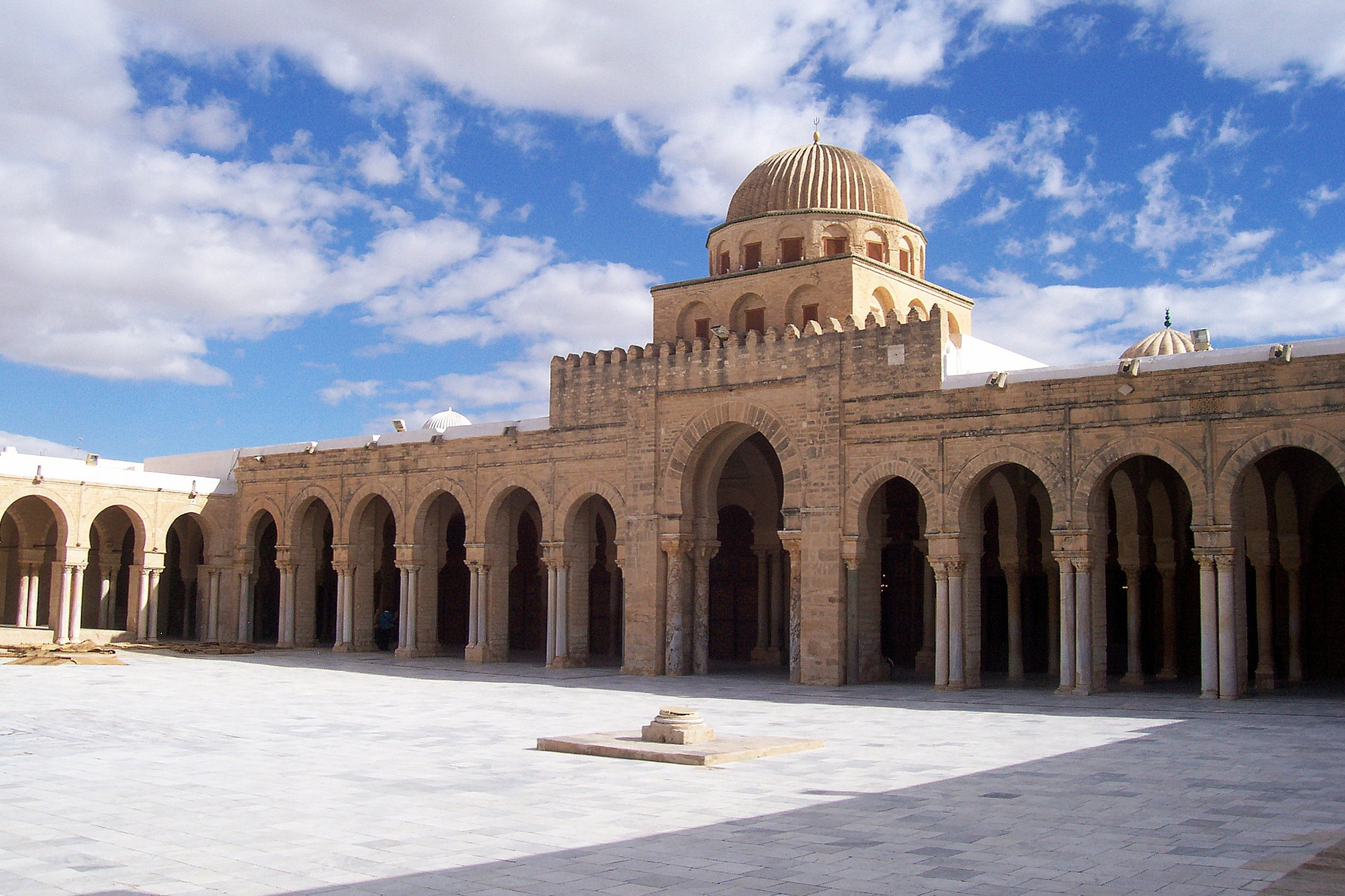
The Great Mosque of Kairouan in Tunisia, founded by Arab general Uqba ibn Nafi in 670, one of the oldest and most notable mosques in North Africa

The early Muslim conquests included North Africa by 640. By 700, most of North Africa had come under Muslim rule. Indigenous Berbers subsequently started to form their own polities in response in places such as Fez and Sijilmasa. In the eleventh century, a reformist movement made up of members that called themselves the Almoravid dynasty expanded south into Sub-Saharan Africa.

North Africa's populous and flourishing civilization collapsed after exhausting its resources in internal fighting and suffering devastation from the invasion of the Banu Sulaym and Banu Hilal. Ibn Khaldun noted that the lands ravaged by Banu Hilal invaders had become completely arid desert.

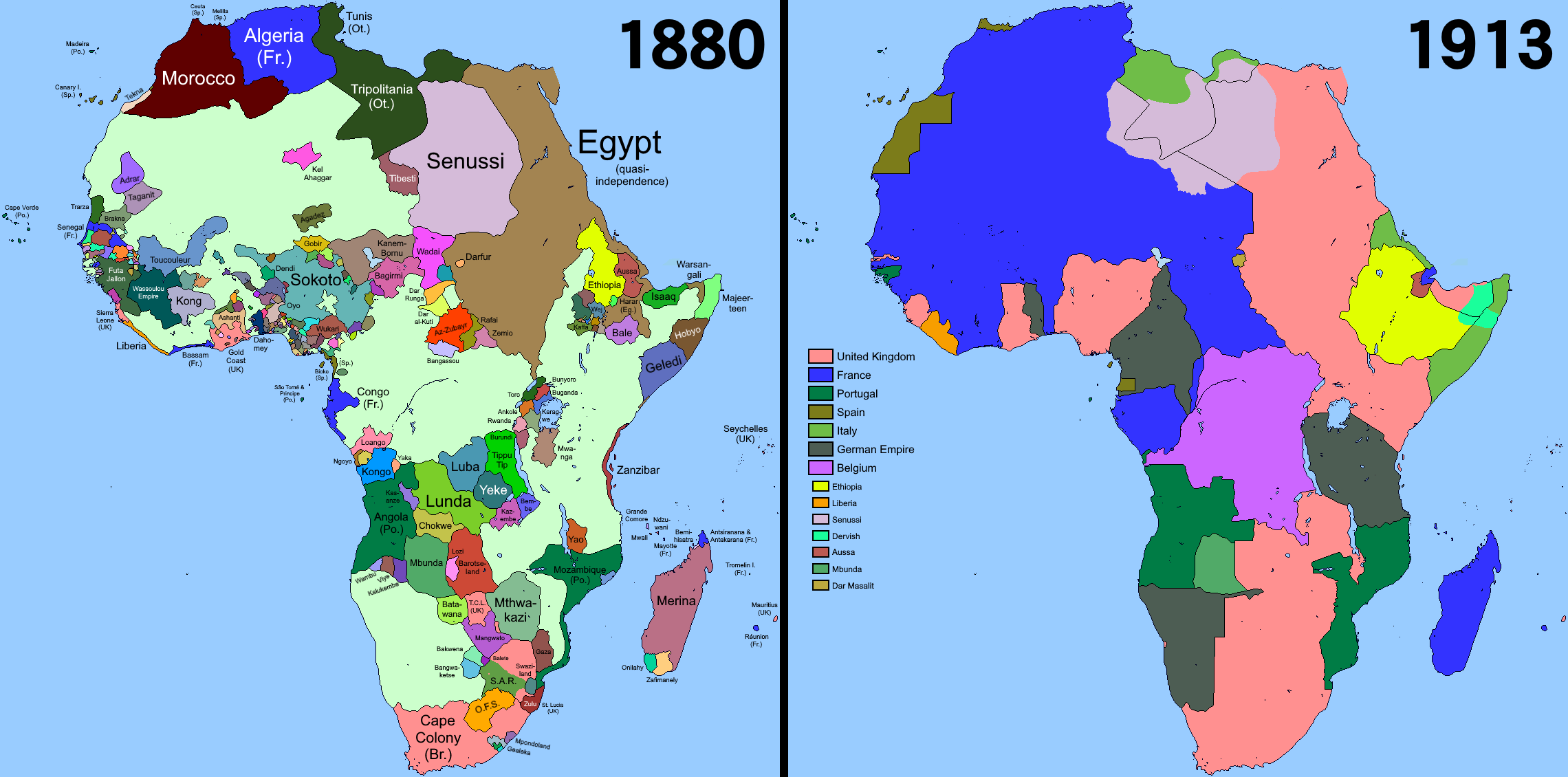
Comparison of North Africa in the years 1880 and 1913

After the Middle Ages much of the area was loosely under the control of the Ottoman Empire. The Barbary pirates operated from the largely independent Barbary states located on the coast of North Africa. The Spanish Empire conquered several coastal cities between the 16th and 18th centuries. After the 19th century, the imperial and colonial presence of France, the United Kingdom, Spain and Italy left the entirety of the region under one form of European occupation.

In World War II from 1940 to 1943 the area was the setting for the North African Campaign. During the 1950s and 1960s all of the North African states gained independence. There remains a dispute over Western Sahara between Morocco and the Algerian-backed Polisario Front.

The wider protest movement known as the Arab Spring began with revolutions in Tunisia and Egypt which ultimately led to the overthrow of their governments, as well as civil war in Libya. Large protests also occurred in Algeria and Morocco to a lesser extent. Many hundreds died in the uprisings.

== Geography ==
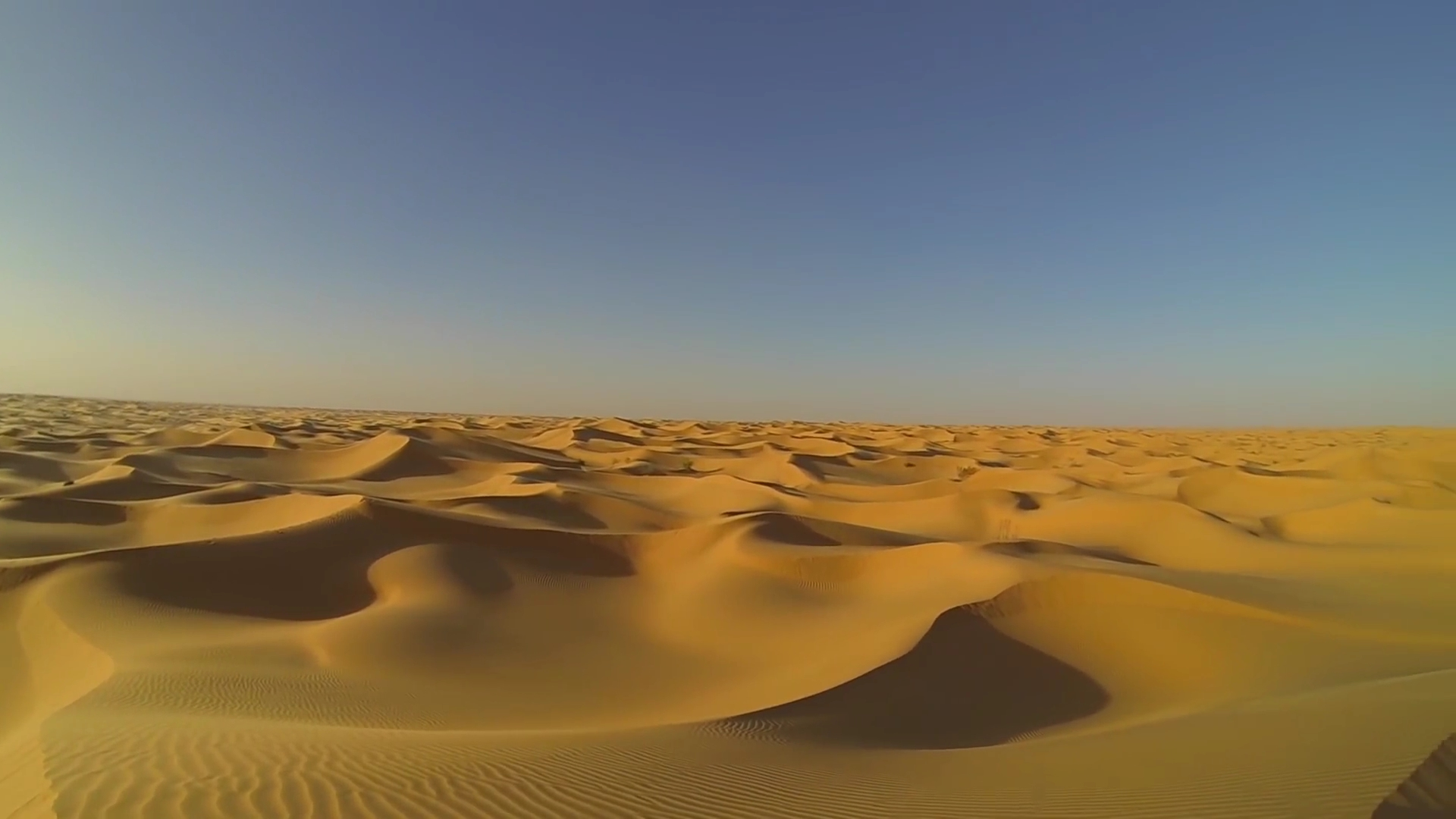
Sand dunes in the Algerian Sahara

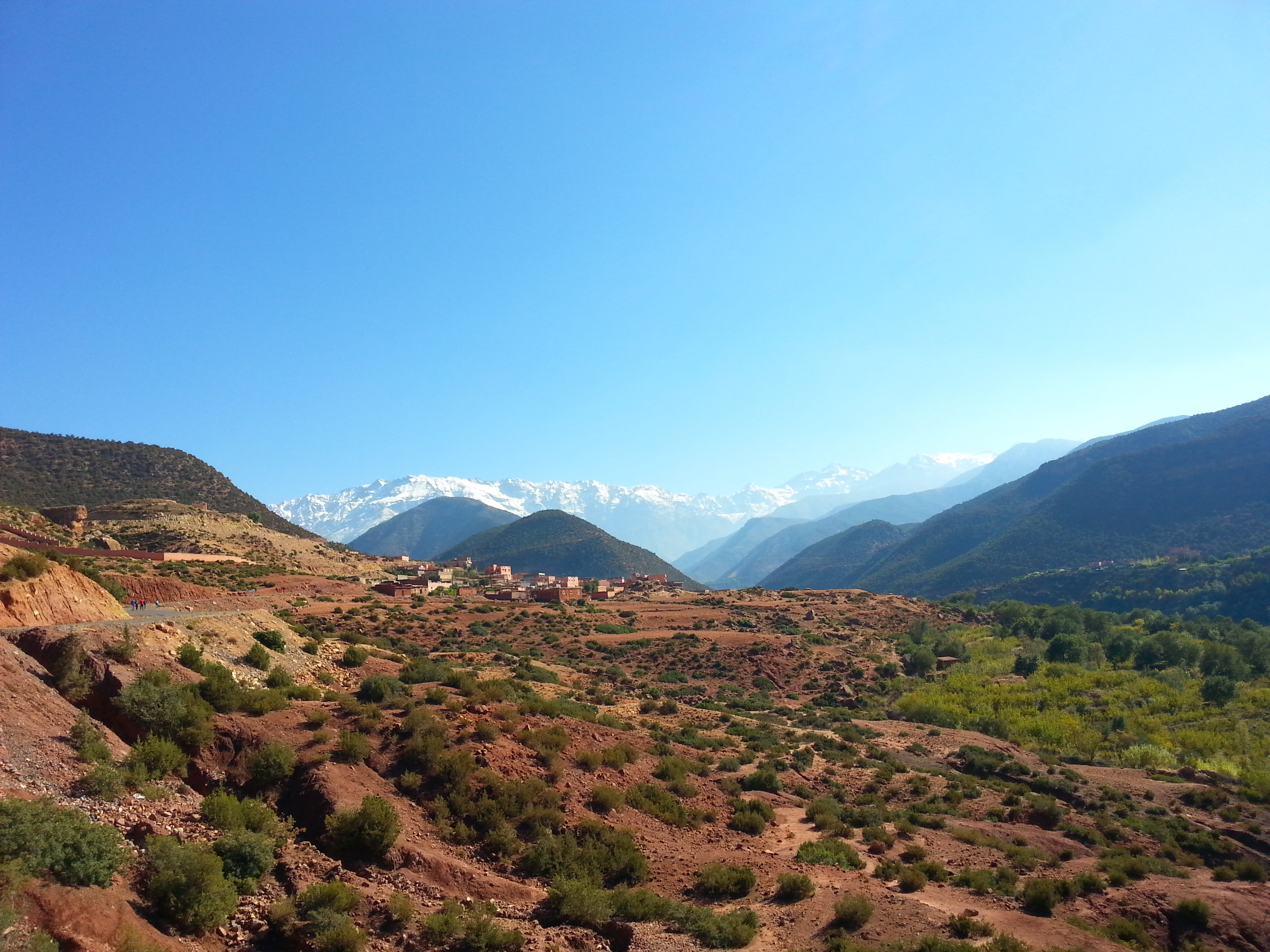
Atlas Mountains in Morocco

North Africa has three main geographic features: the Sahara desert in the south, the Atlas Mountains in the west, and the Nile River and delta in the east. The Atlas Mountains extend across much of northern Algeria, Morocco, and Tunisia. These mountains are part of the fold mountain system that also runs through much of Southern Europe. They recede to the south and east, becoming a steppe landscape before meeting the Sahara desert, which covers more than 75 percent of the region. The tallest peaks are in the High Atlas range in south-central Morocco, which has many snow-capped peaks.

South of the Atlas Mountains is the dry and barren expanse of the Sahara desert, the largest sand desert in the world. In places the desert is cut by irregular watercourses called wadis—streams that flow only after rainfall but are usually dry. The Sahara's major landforms include ergs, large seas of sand that sometimes form into huge dunes; the hammada, a level rocky plateau without soil or sand; and the reg, a desert pavement. The Sahara covers the southern part of Algeria, Morocco and Tunisia, and most of Libya. Only two regions of Libya are outside the desert: Tripolitania in the northwest and Cyrenaica in the northeast. Most of Egypt is also desert, with the exception of the Nile River and the irrigated land along its banks. The Nile Valley forms a narrow fertile thread that runs along the length of the country.

Sheltered valleys in the Atlas Mountains, the Nile Valley and Delta, and the Mediterranean coast are the main sources of fertile farming land. A wide variety of valuable crops including cereals, rice and cotton, and woods such as cedar and cork, are grown. Typical Mediterranean crops, such as olives, figs, dates and citrus fruits, also thrive in these areas. The Nile Valley is particularly fertile and most of Egypt lives close to the river. Elsewhere, irrigation is essential to improve crop yields on the desert margins.

== Economy ==
=== Science and technology ===
Further information in the sections of History of science and technology in Africa:

- Education
- Astronomy
- Mathematics
- Metallurgy
- Medicine
- Agriculture
- Textiles
- Maritime technology
- Architecture
- Communication systems
- Warfare
- Commerce
- By country

== Demographics ==
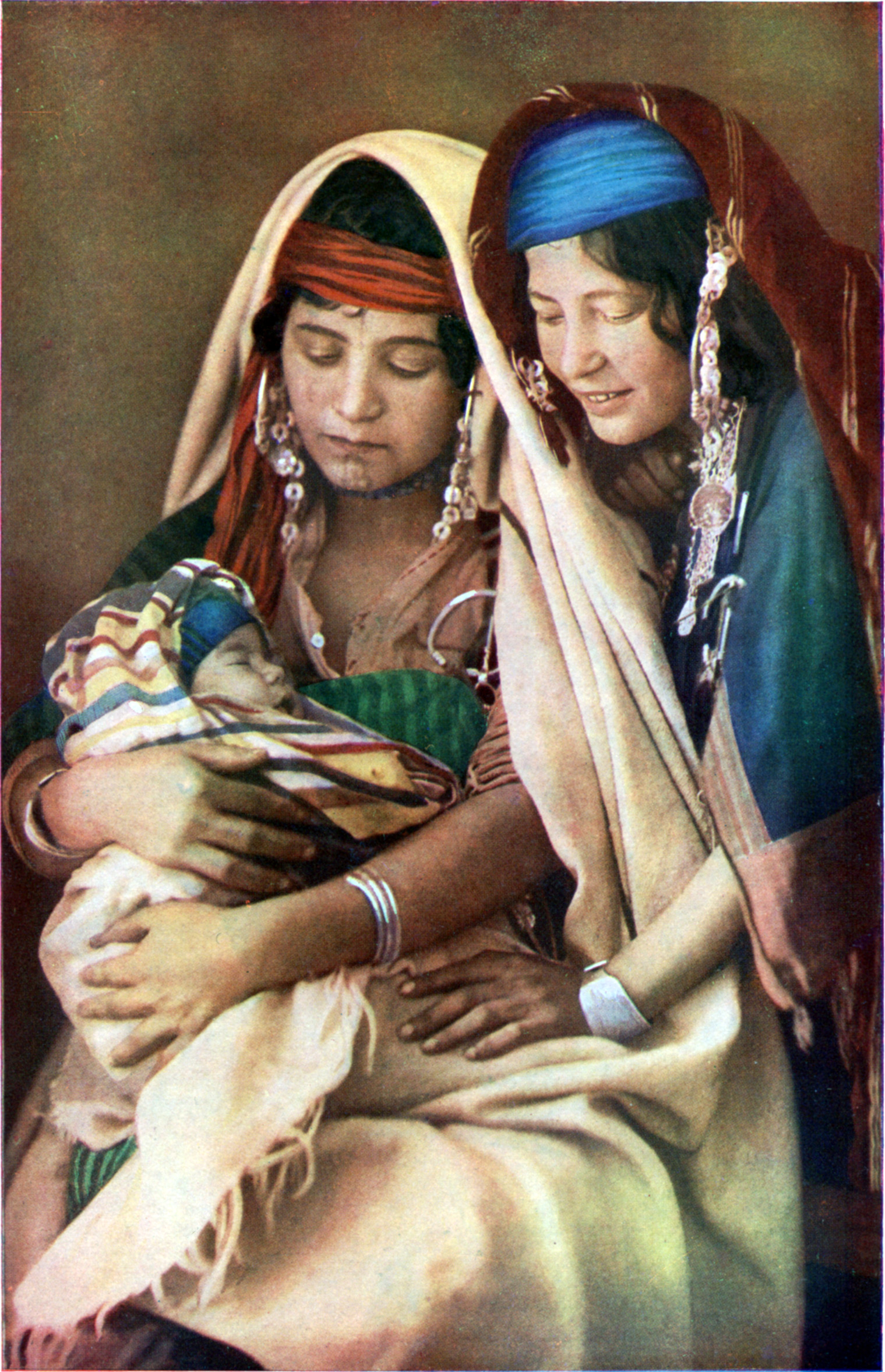
Bedouin women in Tunisia in 1922

=== Ethnic groups ===
The inhabitants of North Africa are roughly divided in a manner corresponding to the principal geographic regions of North Africa: the Maghreb, the Nile valley, and the Sahel. The countries making up North Africa all have Modern Standard Arabic as their official language. Additionally, Algeria and Morocco recognize Berber as an official language alongside Arabic. French also serves as an administrative language in Algeria, Morocco and Tunisia. The most spoken dialects are Maghrebi Arabic, a form of ancient Arabic dating back from the 8th century AD, and Egyptian Arabic. The largest and most numerous ethnic group in North Africa are the Arabs. In Algeria and Morocco, Berbers make up a sizeable portion of the population. Arabs constitute 70% to 80% of the population of Algeria, 92% to 97% of Libya, 67% to 70% of Morocco and 98% of Tunisia's population. The Berbers comprise 20% of Algeria, 10% of Libya, 35% of Morocco and 1% of Tunisia's population. The region is predominantly Muslim with a Jewish minority in Morocco and Tunisia, and significant Christian minority—the Copts—in Egypt, Algeria, Morocco, Libya, and Tunisia. In 2001, the number of Christians in North Africa was estimated at 9 million, the majority of whom live in Egypt, with the remainder live in Maghreb countries.

The inhabitants of the Spanish Canary Islands are of mixed Spanish and North African Berber ancestry, and the people of Malta are of primarily Southern Italian/Sicilian, as well as, to a lesser extent, North African and Middle Eastern ancestry and speak a derivative of Arabic. However, these areas are not generally considered part of North Africa, but rather Southern Europe, due to their proximity to mainland Europe and their European-based cultures and religion.

Haratins are considered the descendants of ancient inhabitants of the northern Sahara; with admixture from Berbers, groups of Haratin families are scattered across North African, Saharan Arab and Berber tribes. Haratins account for 40-45% of Mauritania's population, situated in the wider north-western African region and are present in core North African countries which include Morocco, Algeria and Tunisia. Nubians are present in the Upper Nile Valley, an estimated 3-5 million population in Egypt with notable communities in the Aswan Governate. Beja people have existed in Sudan and Egypt and long assimilated Arab populations. There are 2.2 million Beja living in Egypt alongside other north-eastern African countries, chiefly the Sudan and Eritrea. In Egypt, Beja live in the south-eastern region and Eastern Desert.

=== Historic movements ===
The Maghreb or western North Africa on the whole is believed to have been inhabited by Berbers and their ancestors since at least 10,000 B.C., while the eastern part of North Africa or the Nile Valley has mainly been home to the Egyptians and Nubians. Ancient Egyptians record extensive contact in their Western desert with people that appear to have been Berber or proto-Berber. As the Tassili n'Ajjer and other rock art findings in the Sahara have shown, the Sahara also hosted various populations before its rapid desertification in 3500 B.C and even today continues to host small populations of nomadic trans-Saharan peoples. Laboratory examination of the Uan Muhuggiag child mummy and Tin Hanakaten child, suggested that the Central Saharan peoples from the Epipaleolithic, Mesolithic, and Pastoral periods possessed dark skin complexions. The archaeological evidence from the Holocene period has shown that Nilo-Saharan speaking groups had populated the central and southern Sahara before the influx of Berber and Arabic speakers, around 1500 years ago, who now largely populate the Sahara in the modern era.

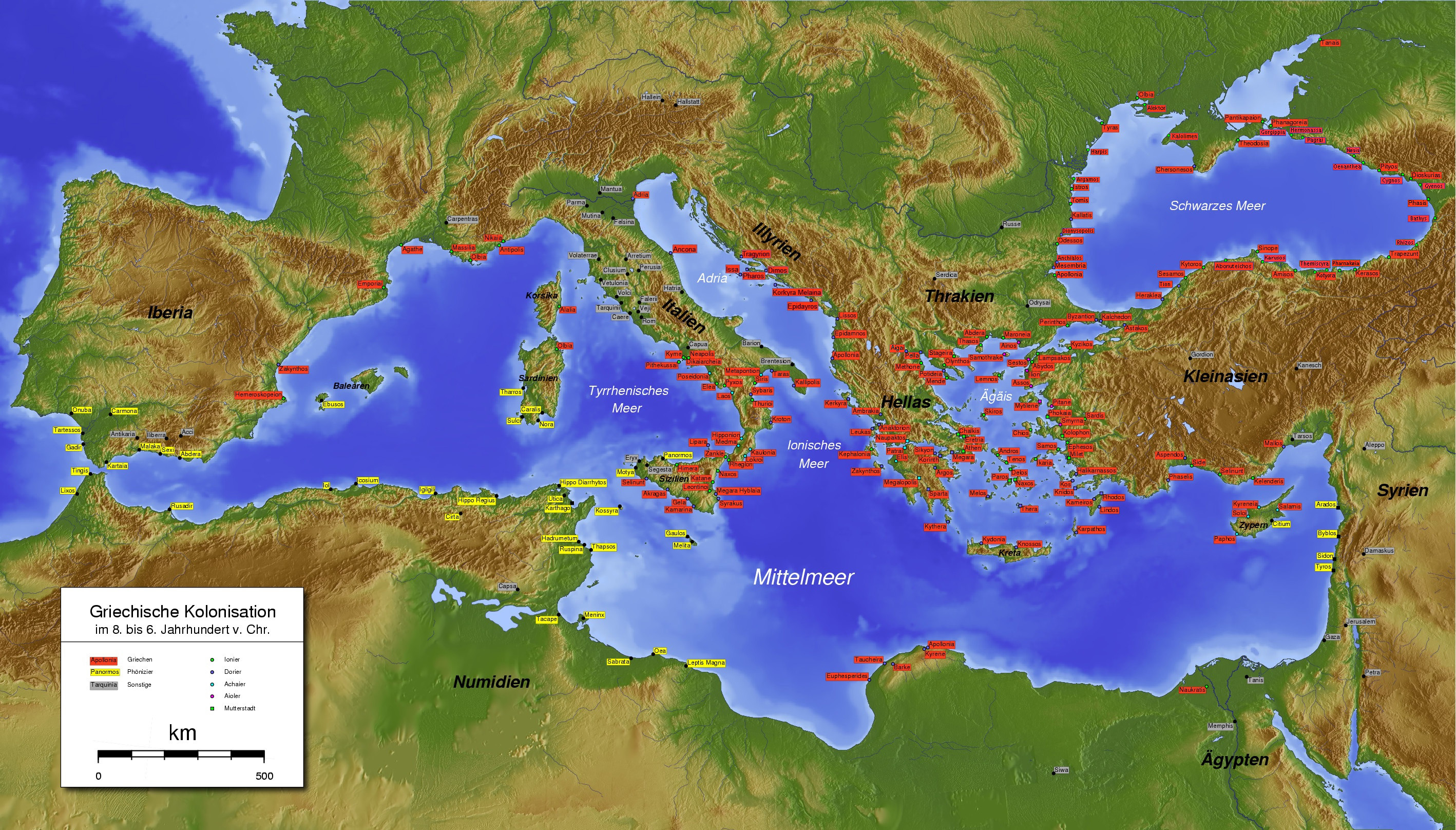
Map of Phoenician (in yellow) and Greek colonies (in red) about 8th to 6th century BC

After migrating to North Africa in the 1st millennium BC, Semitic Phoenician settlers from the Levant established over 300 coastal colonies throughout the region and built a powerful empire that controlled most of the region from the 8th century BC until the middle of the 2nd century BC.

Several waves of Arab migrations to the Maghreb began in the 7th century, including the migration of the Banu Hilal and the Banu Sulaym westward into the Maghreb in the eleventh century, which introduced Arab culture and language to the countryside. Historians mark their movement as a critical moment in the Arabization of North Africa. As Arab nomads spread, the territories of the local Berber tribes were moved and shrank. The Zenata were pushed to the west and the Kabyles were pushed to the north. The Berbers took refuge in the mountains whereas the plains were Arabized. This heavily shifted the demographics of the Maghreb.

The trans-Saharan slave trade resulted in increased levels of sub-Saharan African ancestry in North Africa. The Haratin are commonly perceived as an endogamous group of former slaves or descendants of slaves. Other sources have attributed their origin to ancient populations that inhabited the Saharan region.

=== Genetic history ===
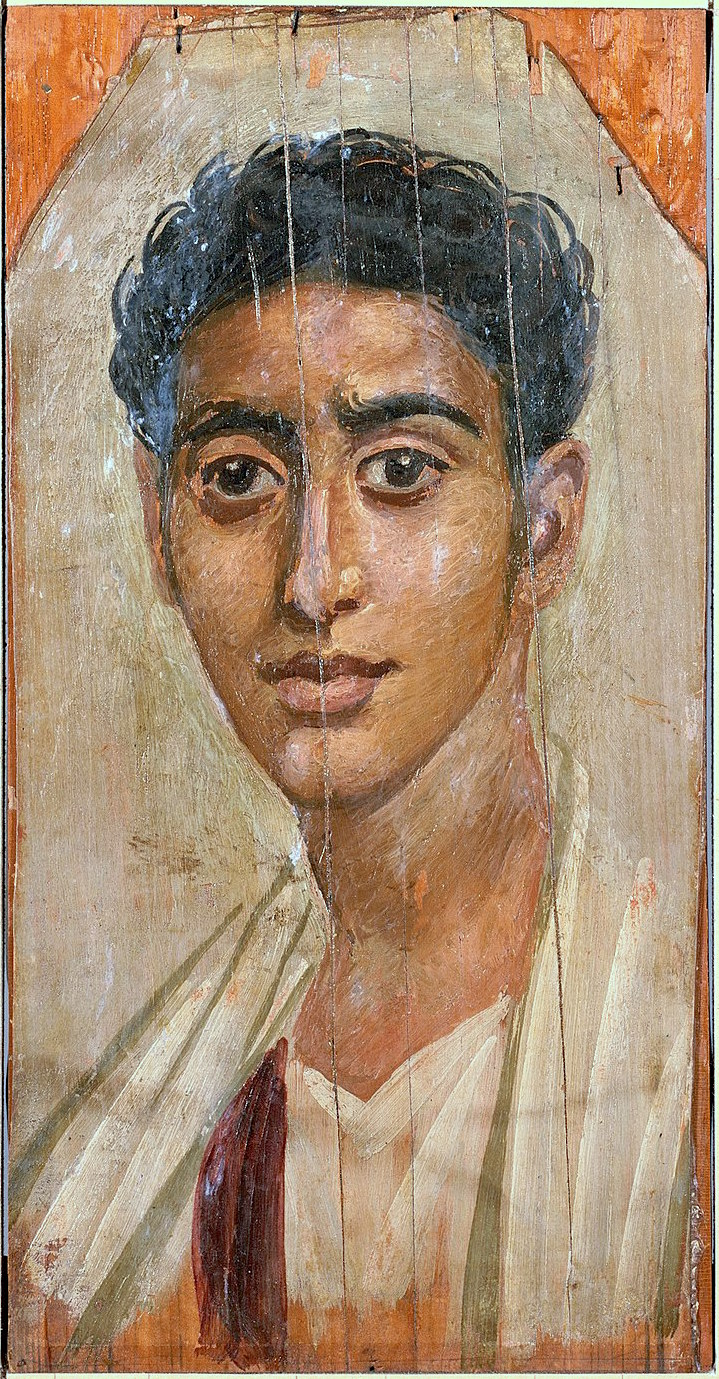
Fayum mummy portrait of a man from Egypt, late 1st century AD; encaustic painting on wood

DNA studies of Iberomaurusian peoples at Taforalt, Morocco dating to around 15,000 years ago have found them to have a distinctive Maghrebi ancestry formed from a mixture of Near Eastern and African ancestry, which is still found as a part of the genome of modern Northwest Africans. A 2025 study sequenced individuals from Takarkori (7,000 YBP) and discovered that most of their ancestry was from an unknown ancestral North African lineage, related to the African admixture component found in Iberomaurusians. According to the study, the Takarkori people were distinct from both contemporary sub-Saharan Africans and non-Africans/Eurasians. They had "only a minor component of non-African ancestry" but did "not carry sub-Saharan African ancestry, suggesting that, contrary to previous interpretations, the Green Sahara was not a corridor connecting northern and sub-Saharan Africa."

Later during the Neolithic, from around 7,500 years ago onwards, there was a migration into Northwest Africa of European Neolithic Farmers from the Iberian Peninsula (who had originated in Anatolia several thousand years prior), as well as pastoralists from the Levant, both of whom also significantly contributed to the ancestry of modern Northwest Africans. The proto-Berber tribes evolved from these prehistoric communities during the late Bronze- and early Iron ages. Ancient DNA provides evidence of continuity from earlier North African populations alongside contacts with populations from Western Asia. A whole genome from an individual buried at Nuwayrat in Middle Egypt around 2855–2570 BCE was modelled as predominantly deriving from North African Neolithic ancestry, with about 20% of his ancestry related to populations of the eastern Fertile Crescent, including Mesopotamia.

The Y-chromosome haplogroup E1b1b is widely distributed across North Africa and northeastern Africa. Its E-M35 branch, for which an origin in eastern tropical Africa has been proposed, is predominantly distributed in an arc extending from the Horn of Africa through Egypt. However, the distribution of a Y-chromosome lineage alone does not show when or in which direction people moved. Historian Christopher Ehret has interpreted the distribution of E-M35 in conjunction with linguistic and other evidence as indicating a population movement from the Horn of Africa into Egypt and the Levant, which he associated with the spread of the Afrasian language family.

According to a recent study, the Arab migrations to the Maghreb was mainly a demographic process that heavily implied gene flow and remodeled the genetic structure of the Maghreb, rather than a mere cultural replacement as claimed by older studies. Another study found out that the majority of J-M267 (Eu10) chromosomes in the Maghreb are due to the recent gene flow caused by the Arab migrations to the Maghreb in the first millennium CE as both southern Qahtanite and northern Adnanite Arabs added to the heterogenous Maghrebi ethnic melting pot. The Eu10 chromosome pool in the Maghreb is derived not only from early Neolithic dispersions from Western Asia but to a much greater extent from recent expansions of Arab tribes from the Arabian Peninsula. While acknowledging the genetic impact of Arabization of Northwest Africa during the Islamic period, other authors have suggested that earlier migration processes, such as the arrival of Neolithic Revolution era famers from Western Asia and Southern Europe together with Bronze Age and Iron Age input from Mesopotamia and the Levant were ultimately more genetically impactful.

David Schoenbrun, Christopher Ehret, Steven A. Brandt and Shomarka Keita (2025) have highlighted the problematic categorisation of genetic haplogroups characterised as ‘African’ and ‘Eurasian' in North African genome studies. In reference to the van de Loosdrecht et al. 2018 study on the epipalaeolithic Taforalt remains from Morocco, which identified the EM35 (primarily EM78) common in north-eastern Africa but characterised the mtDNA (female lineage haplogroups) of U6 and M1 as 'Eurasian', the authors questioned the classification of these maternal haplogroups despite their localised and long-established presence in ancient African populations. In their view, identifying a range of African populations may still remain an issue "since the idea of ‘African’ still gets stereotyped or restricted. (Accepting the southwestern Asian/Levantine geographical continuity with Africa eliminates a conceptual barrier related to racio-typological thinking permitting an Africasian construct analogous to Eurasian.)"

== Culture ==
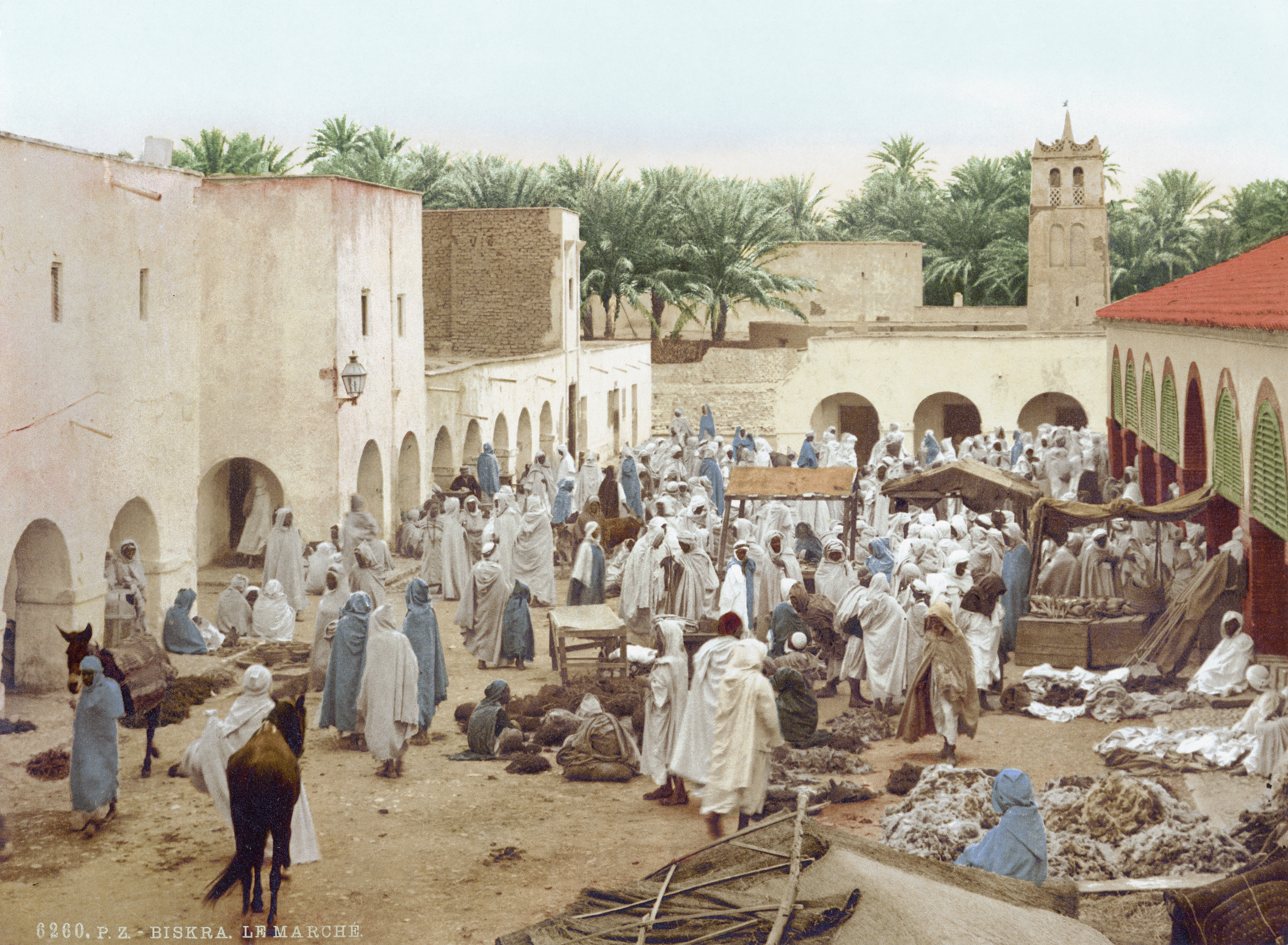
A market in Biskra in Algeria in 1899

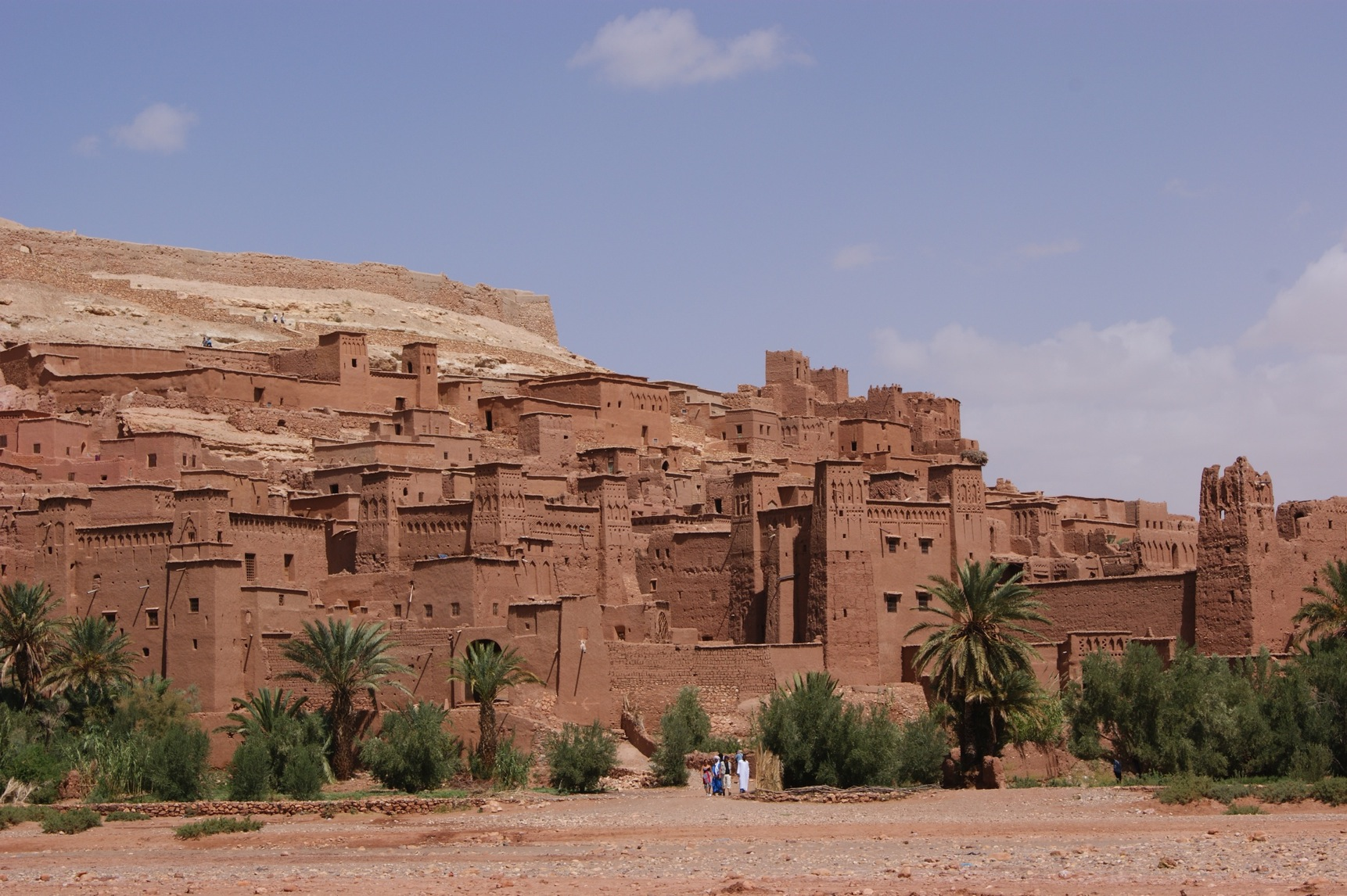
The kasbah of Aït Benhaddou in Morocco

The majority of the people of the Maghreb and the Sahara regions speak varieties of Arabic and almost exclusively follow Islam. The Arabic and Berber languages are distantly related, both being members of the Afroasiatic language family. The Tuareg Berber languages are notably more conservative than those of the coastal cities.

Over the years, Berbers have been influenced by contact with other cultures: Egyptians, Greeks, Punic people, Romans, Vandals, Arabs, Europeans, and Africans. The cultures of the Maghreb and the Sahara therefore combines Arab, indigenous Berber and African elements. In the Sahara, the distinction between sedentary oasis inhabitants and nomadic Bedouin Arabs and Tuaregs is particularly marked.

Egyptians over the centuries have shifted their language from Egyptian (in its late form, varieties of Coptic) to modern Egyptian Arabic while retaining a sense of national identity that has historically set them apart from other people in the region. Most Egyptians are Sunni Muslim, although there is a significant minority of Coptic Christians. The Copts are the largest Christian denomination in the Middle East and North Africa.

The Maghreb formerly had a significant Jewish population, almost all of whom emigrated to France or Israel when the North African nations gained independence. Prior to the modern establishment of Israel, there were about 500,000 Jews in northern Africa, including both Sephardi Jews (refugees from Spain, France and Portugal from the Renaissance era) as well as indigenous Mizrahi Jews. Today, less than 3,000 remain in the region, almost all in Morocco and Tunisia, and are mostly part of a French-speaking urban elite. (See Jewish exodus from Arab and Muslim countries.)

=== Architecture ===
Further information in the sections of Architecture of Africa:

- Prehistoric North African architecture
- Ancient North African architecture
- Medieval North African architecture

== See also ==
- Culture of Egypt
- Demographics of the Middle East and North Africa
- European Digital Archive on Soil Maps of the World
- List of modern conflicts in North Africa
- List of Roman Latin poets and writers from North Africa
- History of the Jews in North Africa
