= European Digital Archive on Soil Maps of the World =

European Digital Archive on Soil Maps (EuDASM) is a digital inventory of the maps holding valuable information pertaining to soil that are highly demanded in various environmental assessment studies focusing on policy issues. The EuDASM is a common platform established by Joint Research Centre in Italy of the European Commission and the International Soil Reference and Information Centre(ISRIC) of Wageningen University in The Netherlands to store soil and related maps in digital format and to provide free access to the global community (Researchers, University scholars, policy makers, etc.). The archive is typically unique at the present times, for it is the only archive that holds nearly 6000 maps online related to soils and are freely accessible to the public around the world. Moreover, the major focus of the EuDASM initiative is towards the developing nations of Africa, South America, Asia etc., in order to assist them to arrest the loss of existing information and prevent the quality deterioration.

More Information about EuDASM: Panagos, P., Jones, A., Bosco, C., Senthil Kumar P.S. European digital archive on soil maps (EuDASM): preserving important soil data for public free access. International Journal of Digital Earth (2011), 4 (5), pp. 434–443. doi:10.1080/17538947.2011.596580

In 2013–2014, the European Digital Archive of Soil Maps (EuDASM) has been concluded the metadata for Europe. You can find the Metadata for 1,312 European maps. This is part of the global EuDASM project making available more than 6,000 Maps from 142 countries around the World. EuDASM transferred paper-based soil maps into a digital format with the maximum possible resolution and to ensure their preservation and easy disclosure. Many of these documents are over 50 years old and are beginning to deteriorate
