= The Flight of the Phoenix =

(The) Flight of the Phoenix may refer to:

- The Flight of the Phoenix (novel), a 1964 novel by Elleston Trevor
  - The Flight of the Phoenix (1965 film), an adaptation starring James Stewart
  - Flight of the Phoenix (2004 film), a later adaptation
- "Flight of the Phoenix" (Arrested Development), an episode of Arrested Development
- "Flight of the Phoenix" (Battlestar Galactica), an episode of Battlestar Galactica
- "Flight of the Phoenix", a song by Grand Funk Railroad from Phoenix
- Flight of the Phoenix, a novel by Dave Wolverton
- The Flight of the Phoenix, a novel in the Death Merchant series by Joseph Rosenberger
- Flight of the Phoenix, a nickname of a B-50 Superfortress
