= The Flight of the Phoenix (1965 film) =

1965 film by Robert Aldrich

- Theatrical release poster
- Directed by: Robert Aldrich
- Screenplay by: Lukas Heller
- Based on: The Flight of the Phoenix by Elleston Trevor
- Produced by: Robert Aldrich
- Starring: James Stewart; Richard Attenborough; Peter Finch; Hardy Krüger; Ernest Borgnine; Ian Bannen; Ronald Fraser; Christian Marquand; Dan Duryea; George Kennedy; Alex Montoya; Barrie Chase
- Cinematography: Joseph Biroc
- Edited by: Michael Luciano
- Music by: DeVol
- Production companies: An Associates and Aldrich Company Production
- Distributed by: 20th Century Fox
- Release date: December 15, 1965
- Running time: 142 minutes
- Country: United States
- Language: English
- Budget: $3–5 million
- Box office: $3 million (US/Canada rentals)

The Flight of the Phoenix is a 1965 American survival drama film produced and directed by Robert Aldrich, based on the 1964 novel of the same name by English author Elleston Trevor. The story follows a group of men struggling to survive their aircraft's emergency landing in the Sahara. The ensemble cast stars James Stewart, Richard Attenborough, Peter Finch, Hardy Krüger, Ernest Borgnine, Ian Bannen, Ronald Fraser, Christian Marquand, Dan Duryea and George Kennedy.

Although the film was not a financial success, it was well received by critics, who praised Aldrich's direction and the performances of the cast. It was nominated for two Academy Awards: Best Supporting Actor for Bannen, and Best Editing for Michael Luciano. Hardy Krüger was nominated for a Golden Globe Award for Best Supporting Actor, (Note: Krüger later rejected the nomination.) and Aldrich was nominated for Best Motion Picture – Drama.

The Flight of the Phoenix was remade in 2004, titled Flight of the Phoenix.

== Plot ==
Frank Towns is the pilot of a cargo plane flying from Jaghbub to Benghazi in Libya; Lew Moran is the navigator. Passengers include Capt. Harris and Sgt. Watson of the British Army; French physician Dr. Renaud, German aeronautical engineer Heinrich Dorfmann, and oil company accountant Standish. There are also several oil workers, including Trucker Cobb, a foreman suffering from mental fatigue; Ratbags Crow, a cocky Scot; Carlos and his pet monkey; and Gabriele.

A sandstorm disables the engines, forcing Towns to crash-land in the Sahara. As the aircraft comes to a stop, two workers are killed and Gabriele's leg is severely injured.

The radio is unusable, and they are too far off course to be found by searchers. Aboard the plane is a large quantity of pitted dates, but only enough water for 10 to 15 days if rationed. Captain Harris sets out to find an oasis. When Sgt. Watson feigns an injury to stay behind, Carlos volunteers, leaving his pet monkey with Bellamy. Harris and Towns refuse to allow the mentally-unstable Cobb to go along, but Cobb defiantly follows anyway and dies of exposure. Days later, Harris returns to the crash site alone and barely alive. Sgt. Watson discovers and ignores him, although others find him later.

Dorfmann proposes a radical idea to build a new aircraft from the wreckage. The C-82 has twin booms extending rearwards from each engine and connected by the horizontal stabilizer. Dorfmann wants to attach the outer sections of both wings to the left engine and boom, discarding the center fuselage and both inner wing sections. The men will ride on the wings. Towns and Moran believe that he is either joking or delusional. The argument is complicated by a personality clash between Towns, a proud traditionalist aviator who flew for the Allied Forces during the Second World War, and Dorfmann, a young, arrogant German engineer. Moran struggles to maintain the peace.

Towns initially resists Dorfmann's plan, and is incensed when he learns that it anticipates Gabriele's death before the plane is ready to fly. Renaud sways his opinion, saying activity and hope will help sustain the men's morale. Dorfmann supervises the reconstruction, while Towns remains skeptical. The mortally-injured Gabriele dies by suicide, depressing the men; they consider abandoning construction of the new plane. Dorfmann, caught exceeding his water ration, justifies it, saying that only he has been working continuously. He promises to not do it again, but demands everyone work equally hard from then on.

Standish dubs the aircraft "Phoenix", after the mythical bird that is reborn from its own ashes. When a band of Arabs and Berbers camp nearby, Harris and Renaud leave to make contact, while the others remain hidden with the aircraft. The two men are found murdered the next day.

In a dramatic clash that begins in a quiet moment, Captain Towns and Moran are stunned to learn details about Dorfmann's career as an airplane designer. Dorfmann readily tells them that he works for a model airplane company designing radio controlled model airplanes. When asked if he ever worked on the "real thing", Dorfmann calmly tells them no and proudly shows Captain Towns the biggest airplane he ever worked on in his company's sales catalog, which has less than a 2m meter wingspan. When Towns and Moran incredulously question how a toy designer believes he can design a real airplane and make it fly, Dorfmann suddenly becomes angry hearing the word "toy" and vehemently exclaims that toy airplanes and the model airplanes he designs are not the same thing. Dorfmann goes on to bitterly explain that the aerodynamic principles of model airplanes are the same as "the real thing", and in fact many model planes require more exacting designs than full-size aircraft because they don't have the advantage of a pilot flying them. With water and time running out, and having no other choice but to die of dehyration or die trying to fly the cobbled together airplane, Towns and Moran forge ahead without telling the others about Dorfmann's credentials even though they suspect Dorfmann is crazy.

Phoenix is completed. Only seven starter cartridges are available to ignite the engine. The first four startup attempts are unsuccessful. Over Dorfmann's objections, Towns fires the fifth cartridge with the ignition off to clear the engine's cylinders. The next startup attempt is successful. The men pull Phoenix to a hilltop, and climb onto the wings. When Towns guns the engine, Phoenix slides down the hill and over a lake bed before taking off. After successfully landing at an oasis with a manned oil rig, the men celebrate, and Towns and Dorfmann are reconciled.

== Cast ==
- James Stewart as Frank Towns
- Richard Attenborough as Lew Moran
- Peter Finch as Captain Harris
- Hardy Krüger as Heinrich Dorfmann
- Ernest Borgnine as Trucker Cobb
- Ian Bannen as Crow
- Ronald Fraser as Sergeant Watson
- Christian Marquand as Dr. Renaud
- Dan Duryea as Standish
- George Kennedy as Bellamy
- Gabriele Tinti as Gabriele
- Alex Montoya as Carlos
- Peter Bravos as Tasso
- William Aldrich as Bill
- Barrie Chase as Farida

== Song ==
- The Phoenix Love Theme, "Senza fine", sung by Connie Francis
- Music & Italian lyrics by Gino Paoli
- English lyrics by Alec Wilder

== Production ==
=== Locations ===
Principal photography started April 26, 1965, at the 20th Century-Fox Studios and 20th Century-Fox Ranch, California. Other filming locations, simulating the desert, were Buttercup Valley in the Algodones Dunes, California, and Pilot Knob Mesa, California. The flying sequences were all filmed at Pilot Knob Mesa near Winterhaven, located in California's Imperial Valley, on the western fringes of Yuma, Arizona.

=== Aircraft used ===
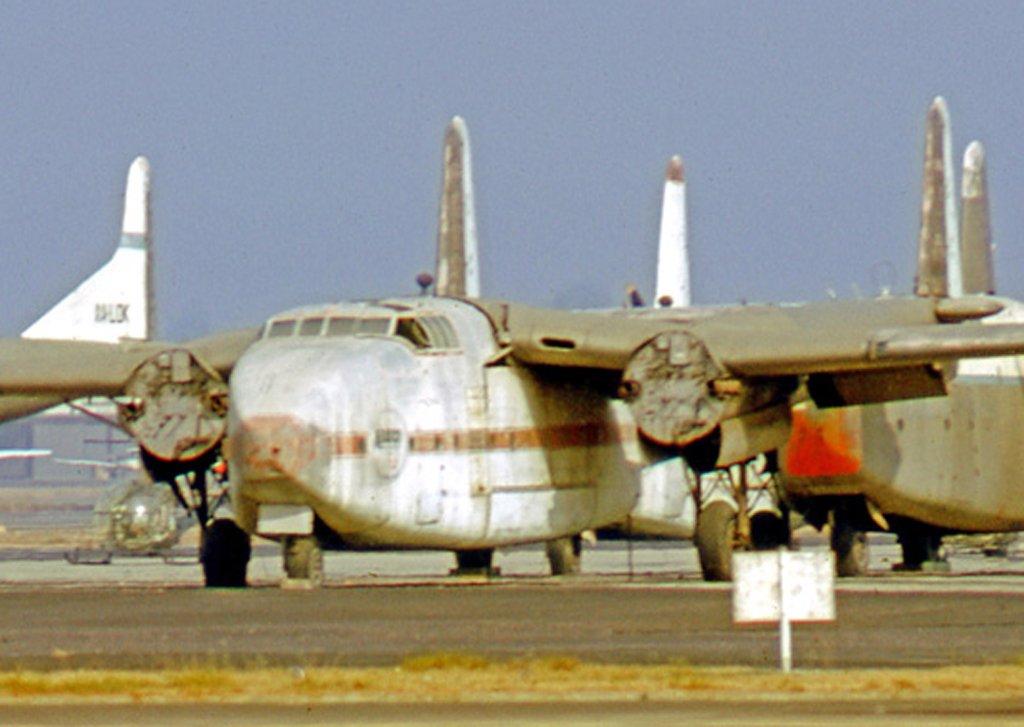
Fairchild C-82A N53228 painted in the markings of the fictional Arabco Oil Company for the film

In 2005, Hollywood aviation historian Simon Beck identified the aircraft used in the film:

- Fairchild C-82A Packet, N6887C — flying shots.
- Fairchild C-82A Packet, N4833V — outdoor location wreck.
- Fairchild C-82A Packet, N53228 — indoor studio wreck.
- Fairchild R4Q-1 Flying Boxcar (the USMC C-119C variant), BuNo. 126580 — non-flying Phoenix prop.
- Tallmantz Phoenix P-1, N93082 — flying Phoenix aircraft.
- North American O-47A, N4725V — second flying Phoenix.

The C-82As were from Steward-Davies, Inc., at Long Beach, California, while the O-47A came from the Planes of Fame Air Museum in Chino, California. The R4Q-1 was purchased from Allied Aircraft in Phoenix, Arizona. The aerial camera platform was a B-25J Mitchell bomber, N1042B, which was also used in the 1970 film Catch-22.

Although principal photography was completed August 13, 1965, to complete filming, a North American O-47A (N4725V) from the Planes of Fame Air Museum was modified and used as a flying Phoenix stand-in. With the canopy removed, a set of skids attached to the main landing gear, and a ventral strake added to the tail, it essentially sufficed as a visual lookalike. Filming using the O-47A was completed in November 1965. It appears in the final flying scenes, painted to look like the earlier Phoenix P-1.

The final production used a mix of footage that included the O-47A, the "cobbled-together" Phoenix and Phoenix P-1.

=== Death of stunt flyer Paul Mantz ===
The flying sequences were flown by racing, stunt, and movie pilot, as well as collector of warplanes, Paul Mantz, co-owner of Tallmantz Aviation, filling in for his partner Frank Tallman, who had injured his leg.

The morning of July 8, 1965, Mantz was flying the Tallmantz Phoenix P-1, the machine that was "made of the wreckage", performing touch-and-go landings for the cameras, when the fuselage buckled during a touchdown. The movie model broke apart and cartwheeled, killing Mantz and seriously injuring stuntman Bobby Rose.

The final credit on the screen was, "It should be remembered... that Paul Mantz, a fine man and a brilliant flyer gave his life in the making of this film..."

== Reception ==
The film opened in select theaters December 15, 1965, with a full release in 1966. Bosley Crowther of The New York Times dismissed it as "grim and implausible", while Variety praised the film as an "often-fascinating and superlative piece of filmmaking highlighted by standout performances and touches that show producer-director at his best".

=== Box office ===
Robert Aldrich said that the film previewed well, and everyone thought it was going to be a big hit, but "it never took off" commercially. According to Fox records, the film needed to earn $10,800,000 in rentals to break even, but suffered a loss after making only $4,855,000.

=== Awards and nominations ===
Award	Category	Nominee(s)	Result	Ref.
Academy Awards	Best Supporting Actor	Ian Bannen	Nominated	
Academy Awards	Best Film Editing	Michael Luciano	Nominated	
American Cinema Editors Awards	Best Edited Feature Film	Michael Luciano	Nominated	
Golden Globe Awards	Best Motion Picture – Drama		Nominated	
Golden Globe Awards	Best Supporting Actor – Motion Picture	Hardy Krüger (Note: rejected the nomination.)	Nominated	
Golden Globe Awards	Most Promising Newcomer – Male	Ian Bannen	Nominated	

== See also ==
- Flight of the Phoenix (2004 film), a re-make of this film
- List of film accidents
- Lady Be Good (aircraft) and Tragedy at Kufra, real life early air crashes in Africa.
- Pan Am Flight 121, a real life passenger plane crash in the Syrian desert with Gene Roddenberry, ceator of Star Trek, as crew member in charge after the crash.
