= Fairchild C-82 Packet =

American twin engine military transport aircraft built 1944-48

C-82 Packet
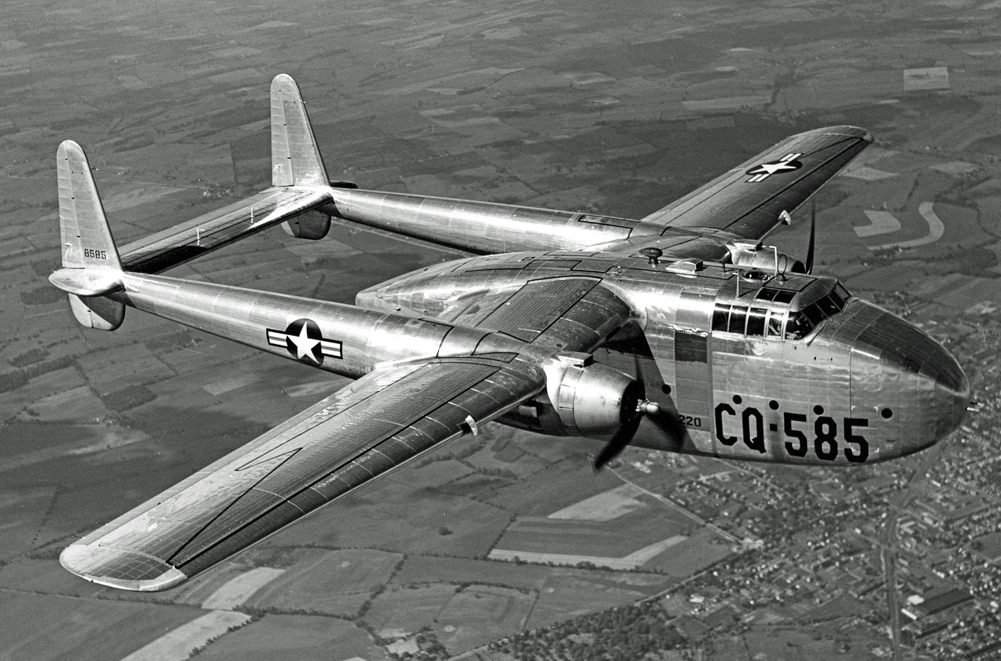
- C-82A Packet

General information
- Type: Cargo and troop transport
- National origin: United States
- Manufacturer: Fairchild Aircraft
- Primary user: United States Army Air Forces
- Number built: 223

History
- Manufactured: 1944–1948
- First flight: 10 September 1944
- Developed into: Fairchild C-119 Flying Boxcar

The C-82 Packet is a twin-engine, twin-boom cargo aircraft designed and built by Fairchild Aircraft. It was used briefly by the United States Army Air Forces and the successor United States Air Force following World War II.

== Design and development ==
Developed by Fairchild, the C-82 was intended as a heavy-lift cargo aircraft to succeed prewar civilian designs like the Curtiss C-46 Commando and Douglas C-47 Dakota using non-critical materials in its construction, primarily plywood and steel, so as not to compete with the production of combat aircraft. However, by early 1943 changes in specifications resulted in plans for an all-metal aircraft. The aircraft was designed for a number of roles, including cargo carrier, troop transport, parachute drop, medical evacuation, and glider towing. It featured a rear-loading ramp with wide doors and an empennage set 14 feet (4.3 m) off the ground that permitted trucks and trailers to back up to the doors without obstruction. The single prototype first flew on 10 September 1944. The aircraft were built at the Fairchild factory in Hagerstown, Maryland, with deliveries beginning in 1945 and ending in September 1948.

Problems surfaced almost immediately. The aircraft was found to be underpowered and its airframe inadequate for the heavy lifting it was intended to perform. As a result, the Air Force turned to Fairchild for a solution to the C-82's shortcomings. A redesign was quickly performed under the designation XC-82B, which would overcome all of the C-82A's initial problems.

== Operational history ==
The C-82A was first flown in 1944, with its initial delivery not until June 1945; as a result, only a few entered service before the end of the war. In the end, only 223 C-82As would be built, a small number relative to other wartime production cargo aircraft. Most were used for cargo and troop transport, although a few were deployed for paratroop operations or towing military gliders.

Once in service, pilots found the C-82A to be severely underpowered, with poor visibility from the cockpit. With one engine out and while carrying a load, the aircraft could not maintain level flight, and this resulted in several crashes. A redesign rectifying the aircraft's main deficiencies, known as the C-82B, would eventually result in the Fairchild C-119 Flying Boxcar introduced in 1949.

In 1946, the United States Postal Service explored the concept of flying post offices using highly modified C-82s, which would operate similarly to those on trains where mail would be sorted by clerks and put in bags and then transferred to trucks on landing.

In 1948, a C-82 was fitted with track-gear landing gear, similar to the tracks on a crawler tractor, that allowed landings on unpaved, primitive runways. The track gear proved unserviceable in operational use and was abandoned.

In January 1948, C-82As with the 62d Troop Carrier Group deployed from McChord AFB to the arctic during Project Yukon, gaining valuable experience operating in an extreme cold weather environment.

During the Berlin Blockade, five C-82 aircraft carried large disassembled earthmoving equipment into the city to enable the construction of Berlin Tegel Airport in the fall of 1948.

While relatively unsuccessful and produced in small numbers, the C-82A served as a developmental precursor to the C-119 and Fairchild C-123 Provider.

The C-82 was retired from the United States Air Force inventory in 1954.

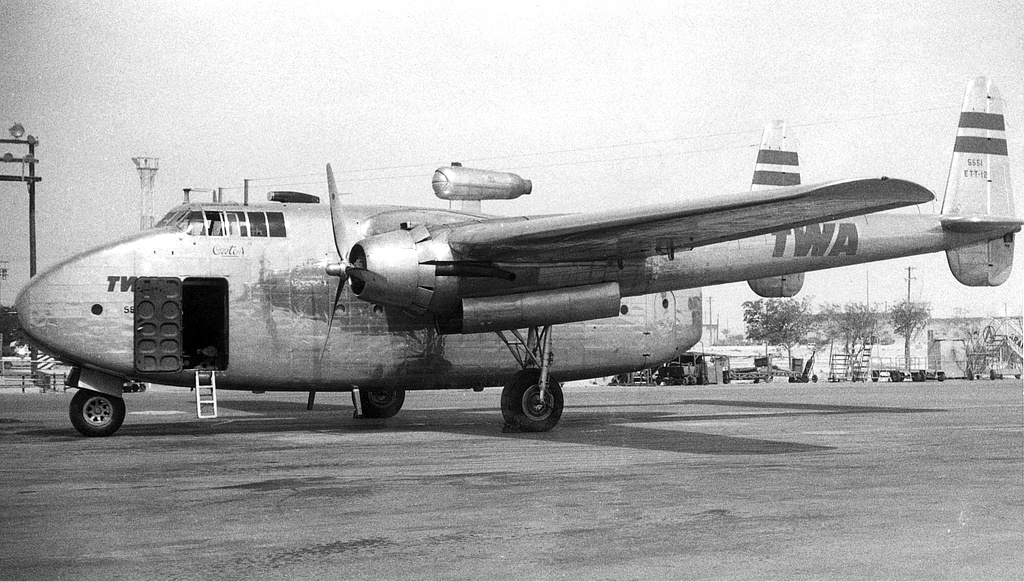
Trans World Airlines Jet-Packet 1600, with Westinghouse J30-W turbojet booster engine in pod above upper fuselage (1959)

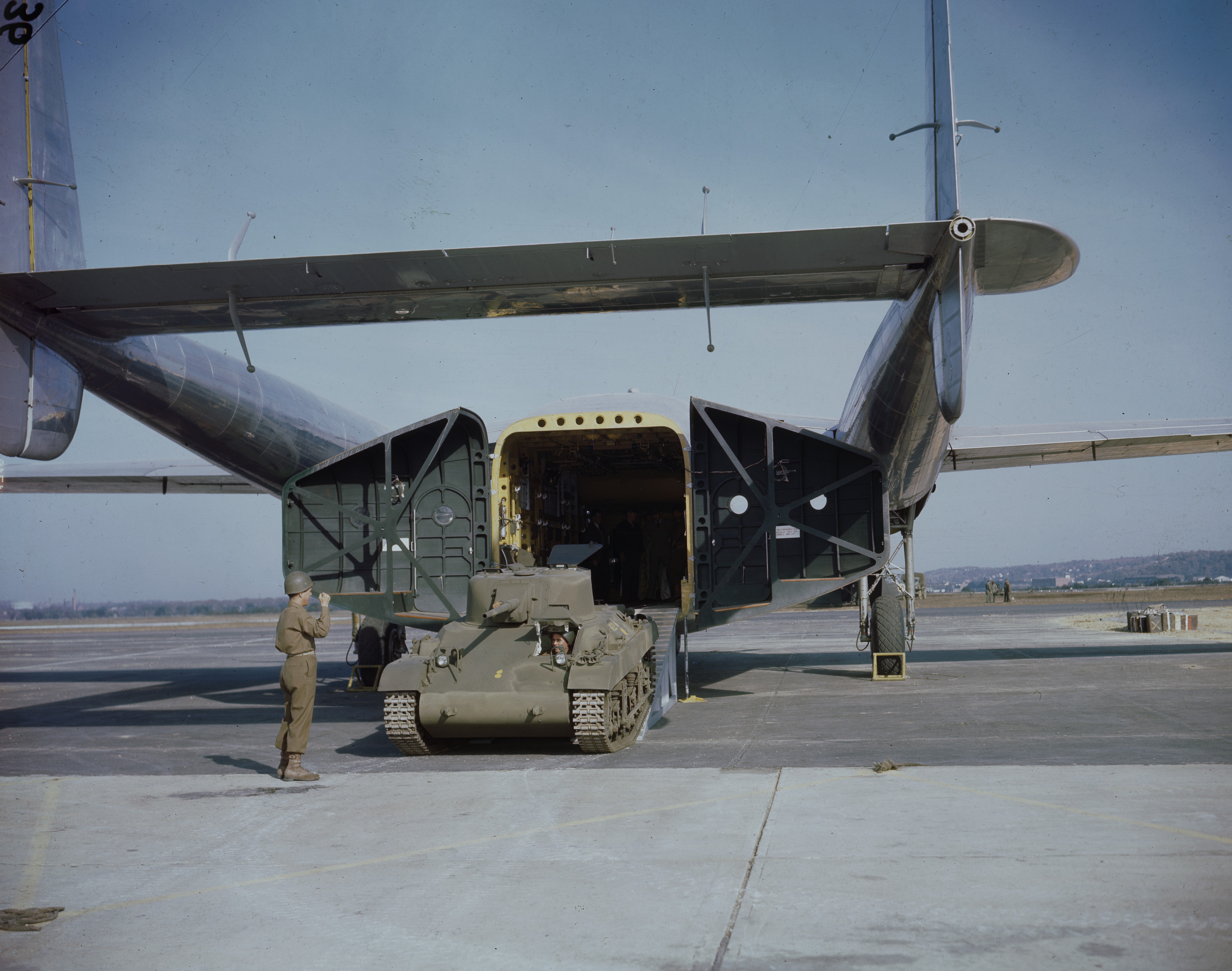
M22 Locust light tank being loaded into C-82

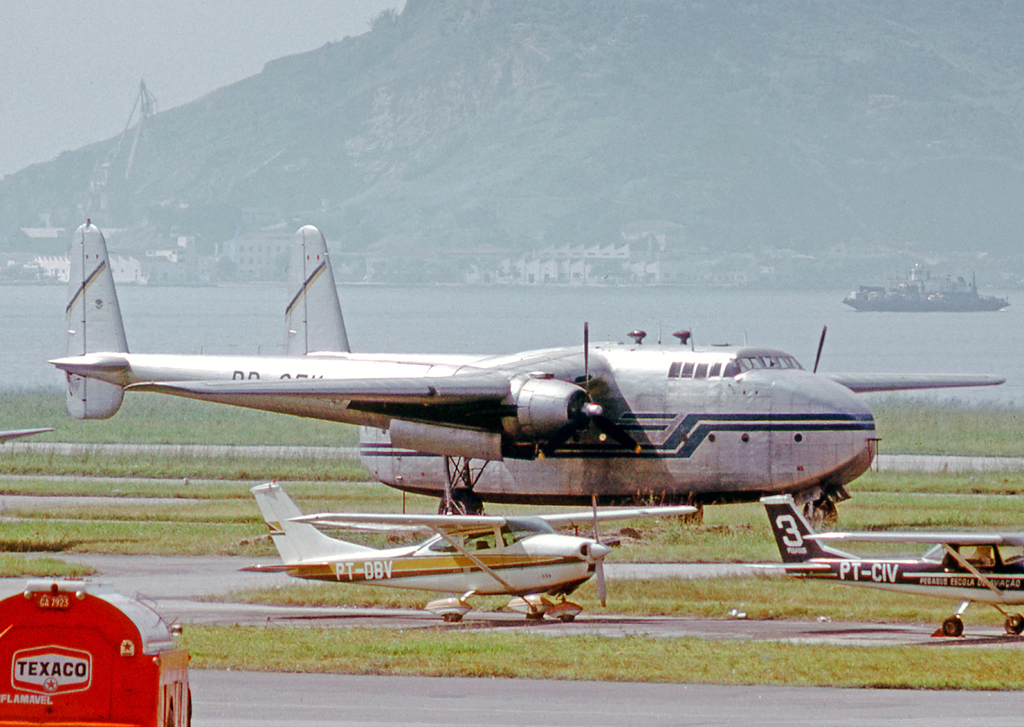
C-82A Packet freighter of Cruzeiro (Brasil) at Santos Dumont Airport, Rio de Janeiro, in May 1972

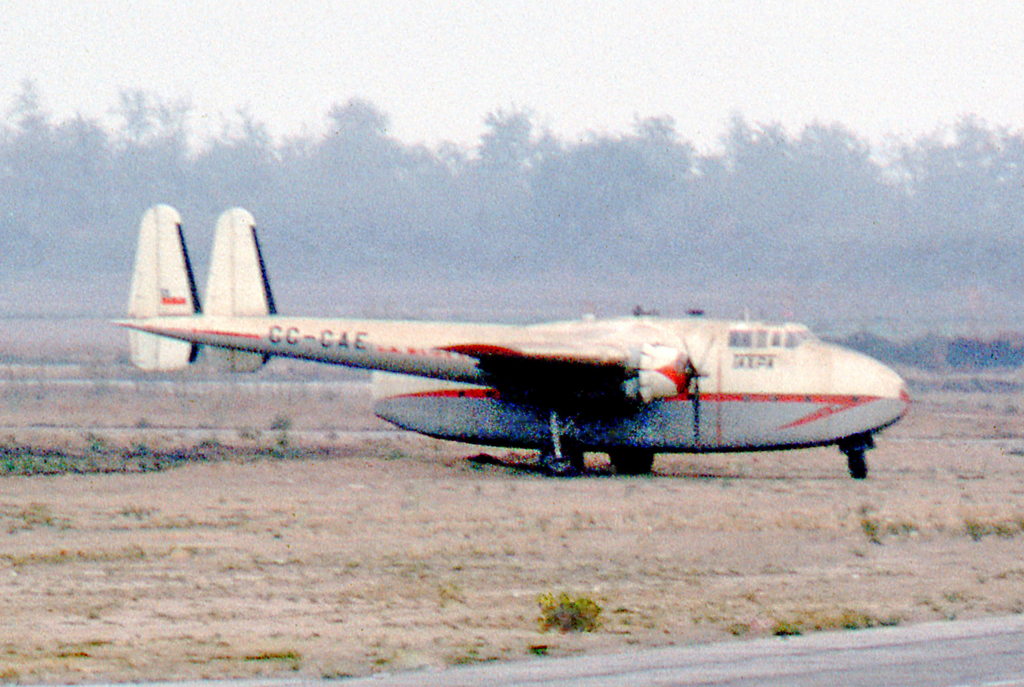
Packet of Taxpa Airlines (Chile) in 1972

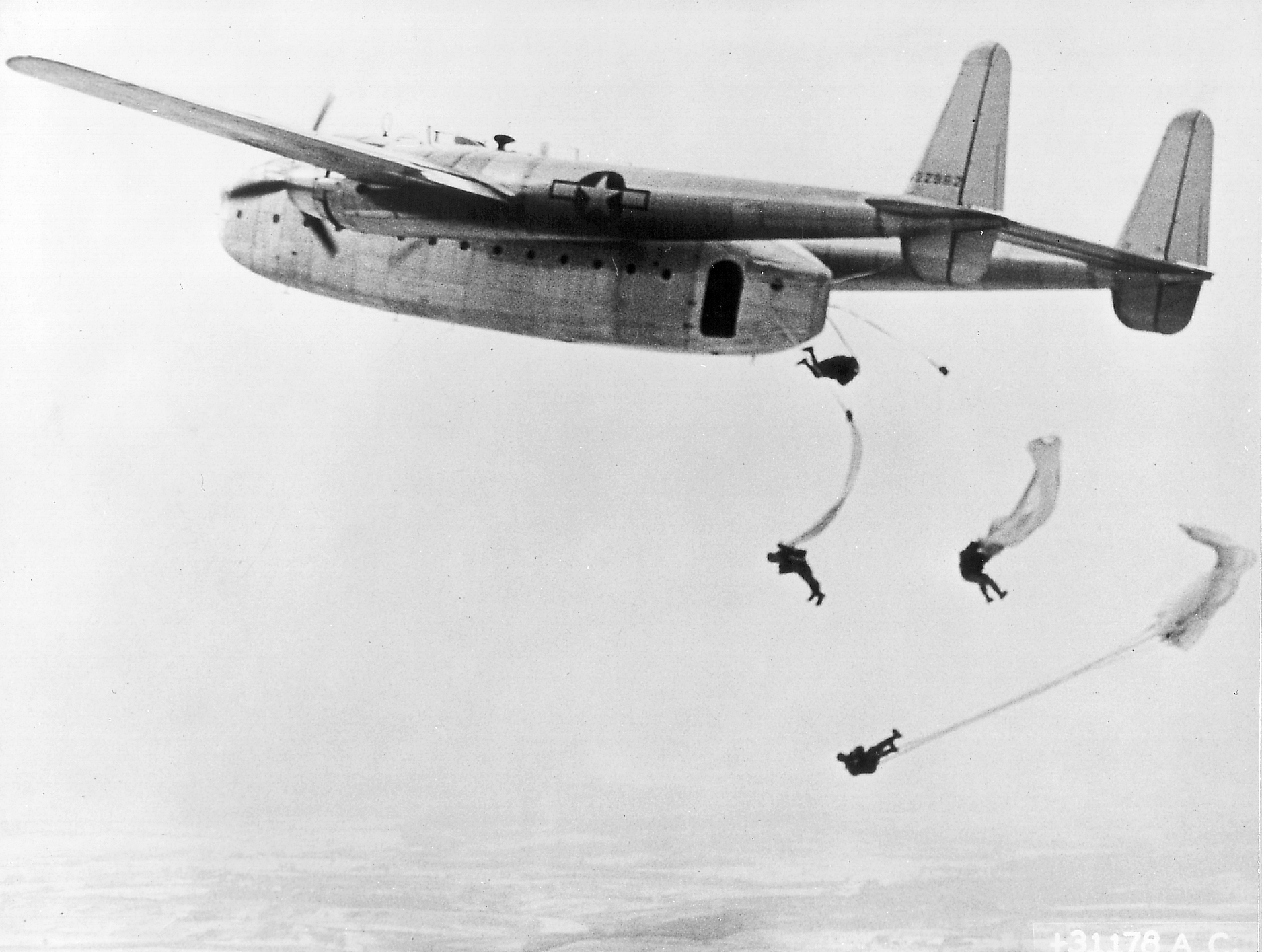
C-82 Packet dropping U.S. Air Force paratroops in training exercise

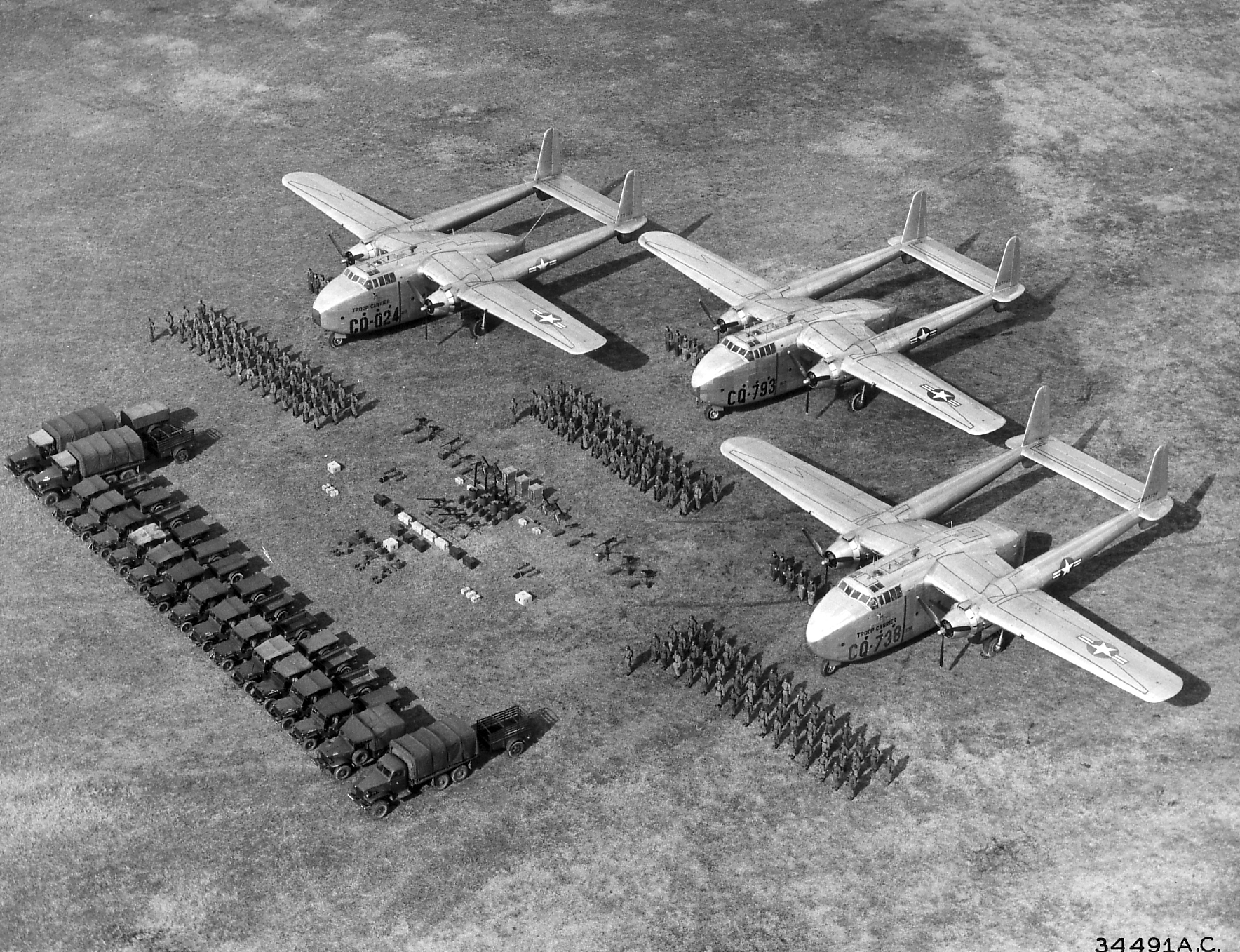
Three C-82s and various troops and cargo in 1948

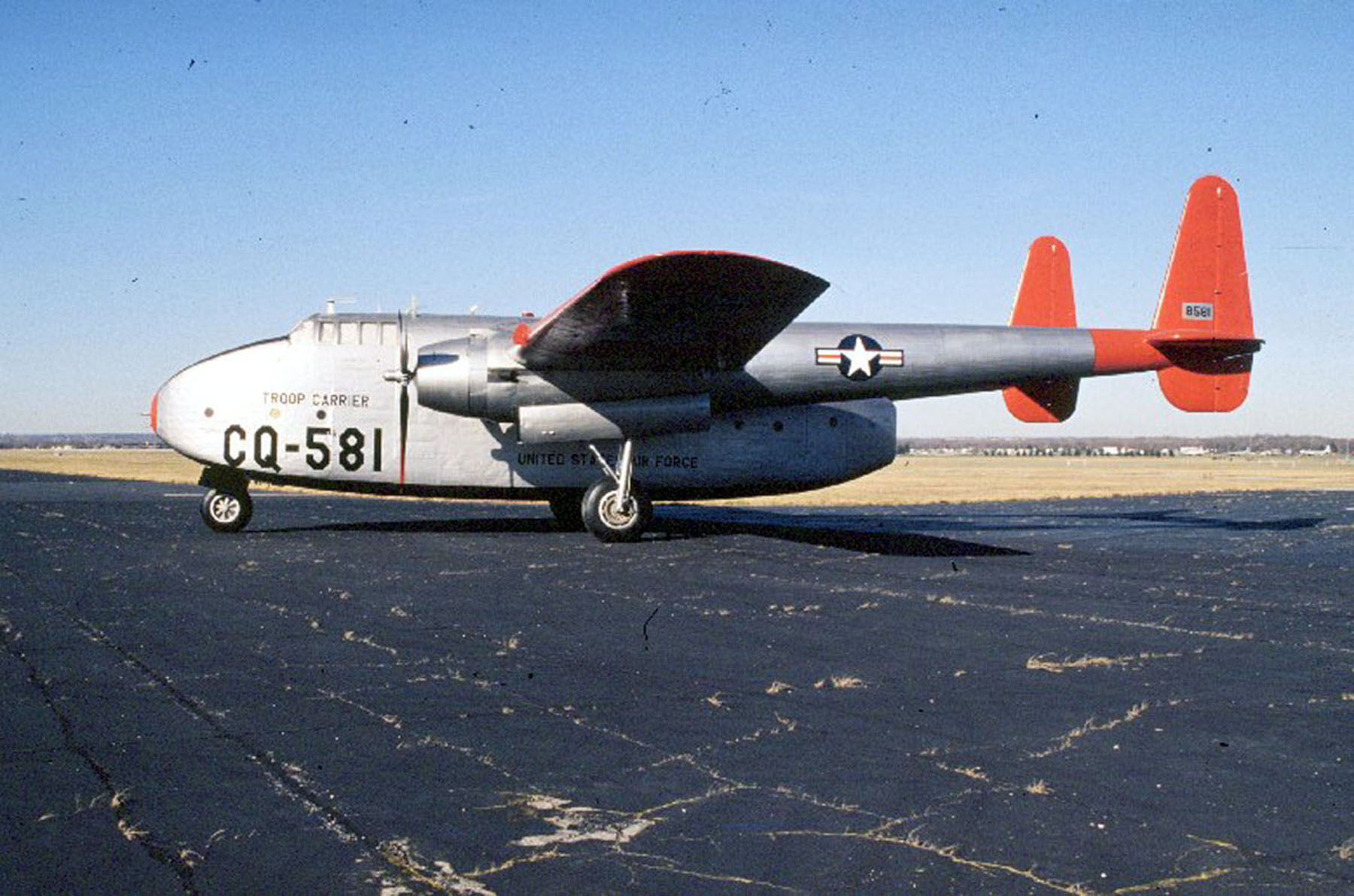
U.S. Air Force C-82 Packet

=== Civil airline operations ===
After the C-82A became surplus to United States Air Force requirements, small numbers were sold to civilian operators in Brazil, Chile, Mexico and the United States and these were utilized for many years as rugged freight aircraft, capable of carrying bulky items of cargo. The last example was retired in the late 1980s.

== Variants ==
XC-82
Prototype, one built.

C-82A Packet
Initial production version, 220 built.

EC-82A
1948, fitted with Firestone-designed tracked landing gear. 13 aircraft allocated for conversion from C-82A, but only one completed.

XC-82B
1947, fitted with 2650hp Pratt & Whitney R-4360 Wasp Major radial engines as a precursor to the C-119 series. One converted from a C-82A.

C-82N
1946, Production aircraft built by North American Aviation. Only three were completed, before the remaining 997 were cancelled.

Steward-Davis Jet-Packet 1600
1956, civil conversion of Fairchild C-82A with 1,600 pounds-force (7.1 kN) Westinghouse J30-W turbojet booster engine in pod above upper fuselage. At least three converted.

Steward-Davis Jet-Packet 3200
Conversion of Jet-Packet 1600 with two J30-W engines in above-fuselage pod. One converted in 1957.

Jet-Packet 3400
Jet-Packet with a 3,250 lbf (14.5 kN) Westinghouse J34-WE-34, or 3,400 lbf (15 kN) Westinghouse J34-WE-36 booster engine. At least four converted from 1962.

Steward-Davis Jet-Packet II
Airframe weight reduction program to increase cargo weights and increased power from Pratt & Whitney R-2800CB-16 engines. Application applied to at least three Jet-Packet 1600s or 3400s, including the TWA C-82A Ontos.

Steward-Davis Skytruck I
1964, C-82A aircraft with 60,000 lb (27,000 kg) takeoff weight, improved performance and a hot-air de-icing system, one converted. The Skytruck brand-name was allegedly the inspiration for Elleston Trevor's Skytruck in the 1964 novel, The Flight of the Phoenix.

Steward-Davis Skypallet
1965 A C-82A redesign with the fuselage floor separating from the aircraft from nose to tail for large cargoes and the installation of an internal hoist. Only one aircraft was converted.

== Operators ==
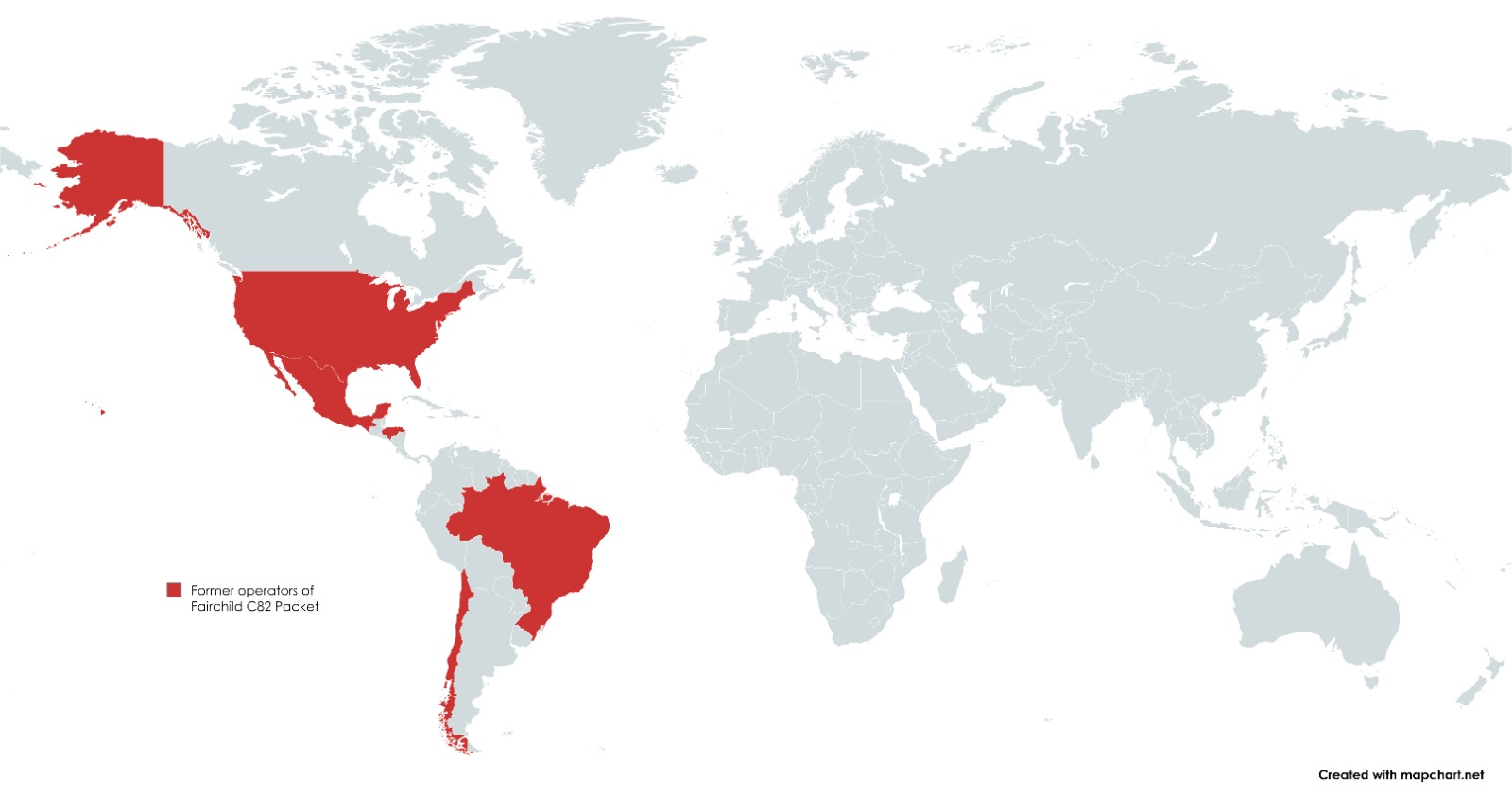
Former Operators of Fairchild C-82 Packet

Brazil

- Brazilian Air Force—the Primeiro Grupo de Transporte de Tropa (1st Troop Transport Group) operated C-82s of 1956–1969
- Serviços Aéreos Cruzeiro do Sul

Chile

- Linea Aerea Taxpa Ltda

Honduras

- Honduran Air Force

Mexico

- Compania Mexicana de Aviacion (CMA)

United States

- Interior Airways
- Trans World Airlines—Used for transporting replacement engines
- United States Army Air Forces

== Surviving aircraft ==
Brazil

- 45-57783 – C-82A stored at Eduardo Gomes International Airport in Manaus. The aircraft is in poor condition.
- 48-0585 – C-82A stored at the Museu Aeroespacial at Campo dos Afonsos in Rio de Janeiro. It is an ex-Brazilian Air Force aircraft.

United States

- 44-22991 – C-82A fuselage only in storage in the Walter Soplata Collection in Newbury Center, Ohio.
- 44-23006 – C-82A on static display at the Pima Air & Space Museum in Tucson, Arizona.
- 45-57814 – Steward-Davis Jet-Packet 3400 on static display at the Hagerstown Aviation Museum in Hagerstown, Maryland. This aircraft under the registration N9701F was used by TWA. The aircraft was flown to the airport on 15 October 2006, marking the world's last flight of a C-82.
- 48-0574 – C-82A on static display at the McChord Air Museum at McChord Field in Tacoma, Washington.
- 48-0581 – C-82A on static display at the National Museum of the United States Air Force at Wright-Patterson Air Force Base near Dayton, Ohio. This airframe was also previously owned & operated by Northern Air Cargo under the Registration Number: N4752C
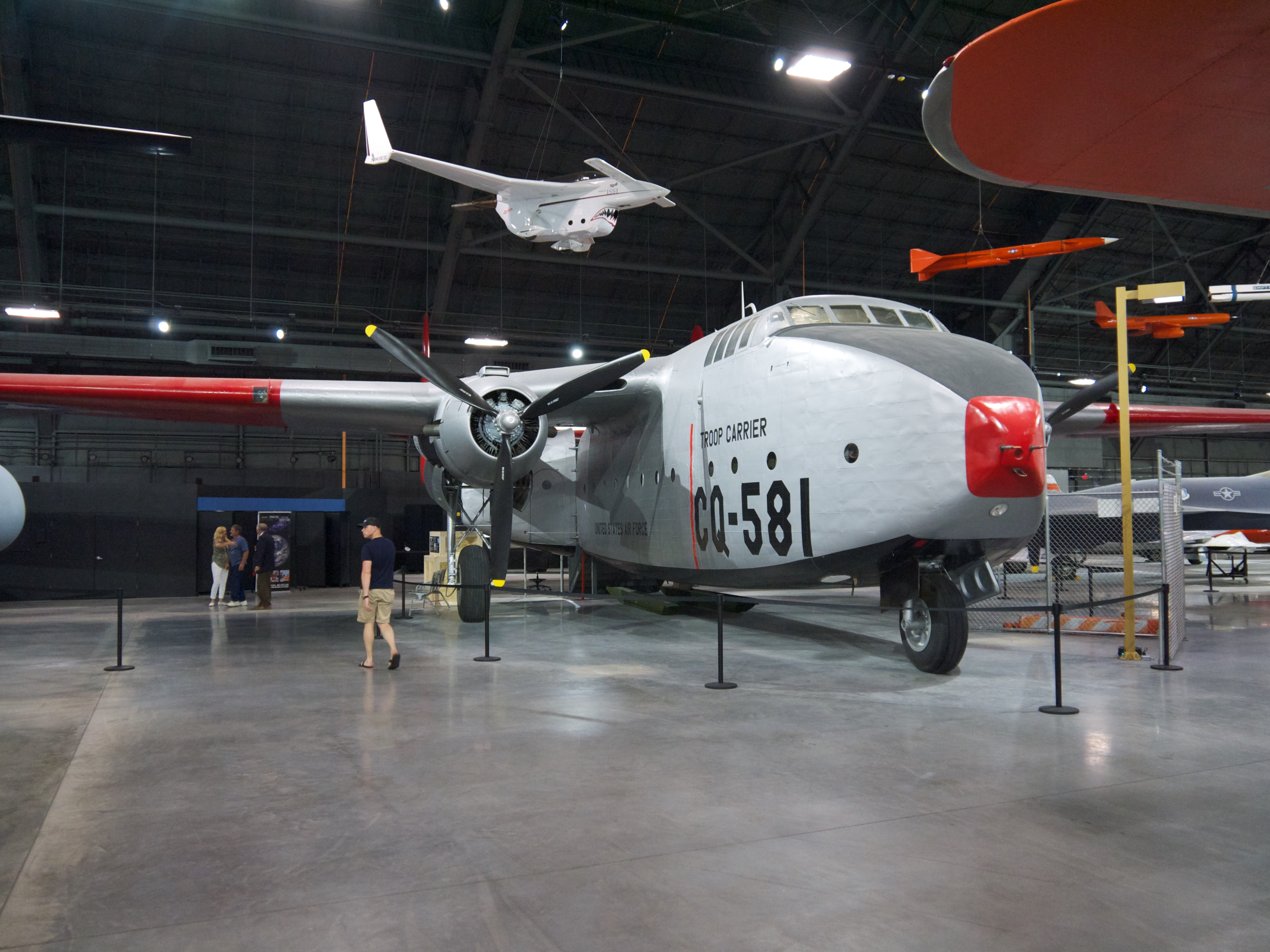
On display at the National Museum of the United States Air Force

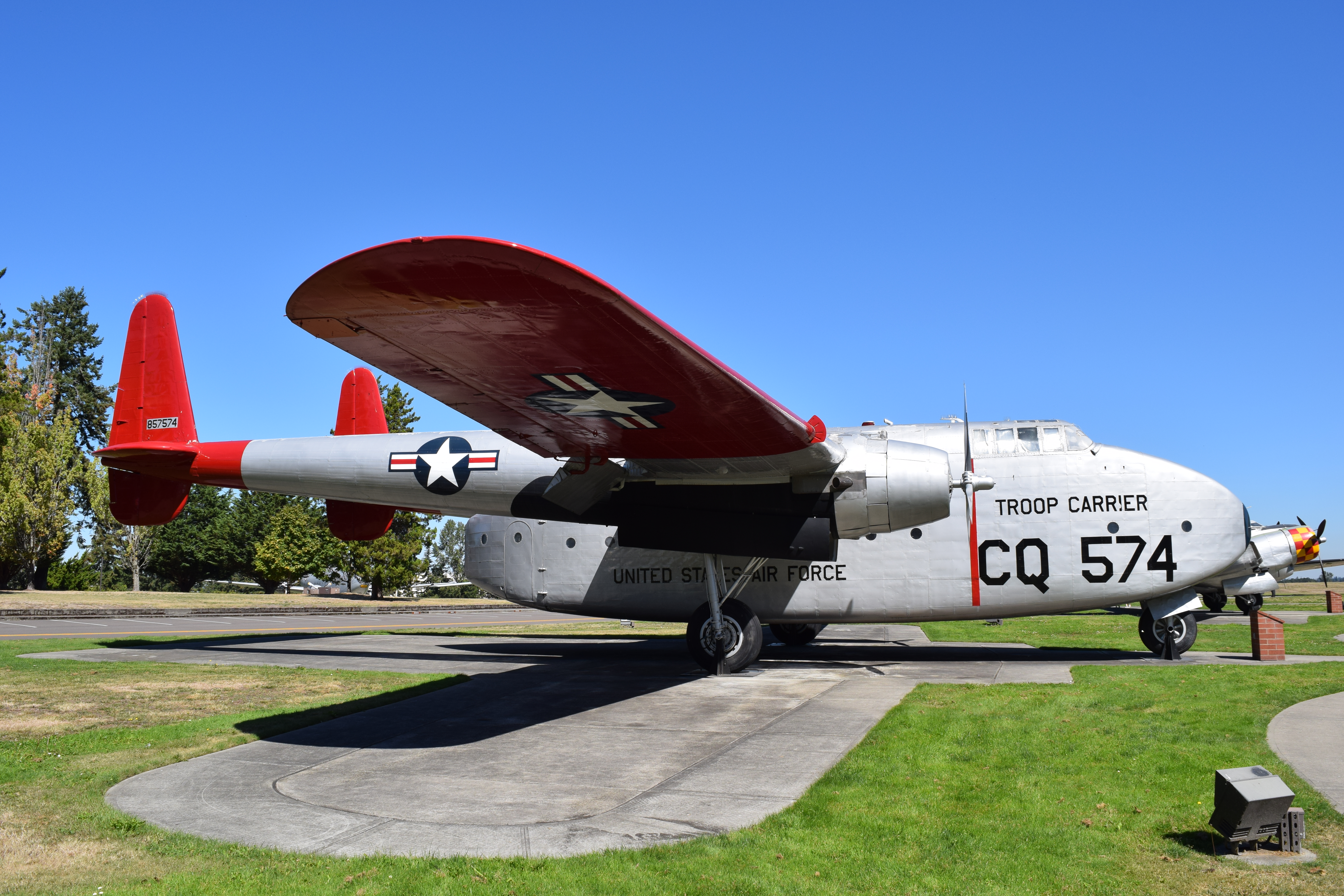
48-0574 at McChord AFB

== Specifications (C-82A) ==
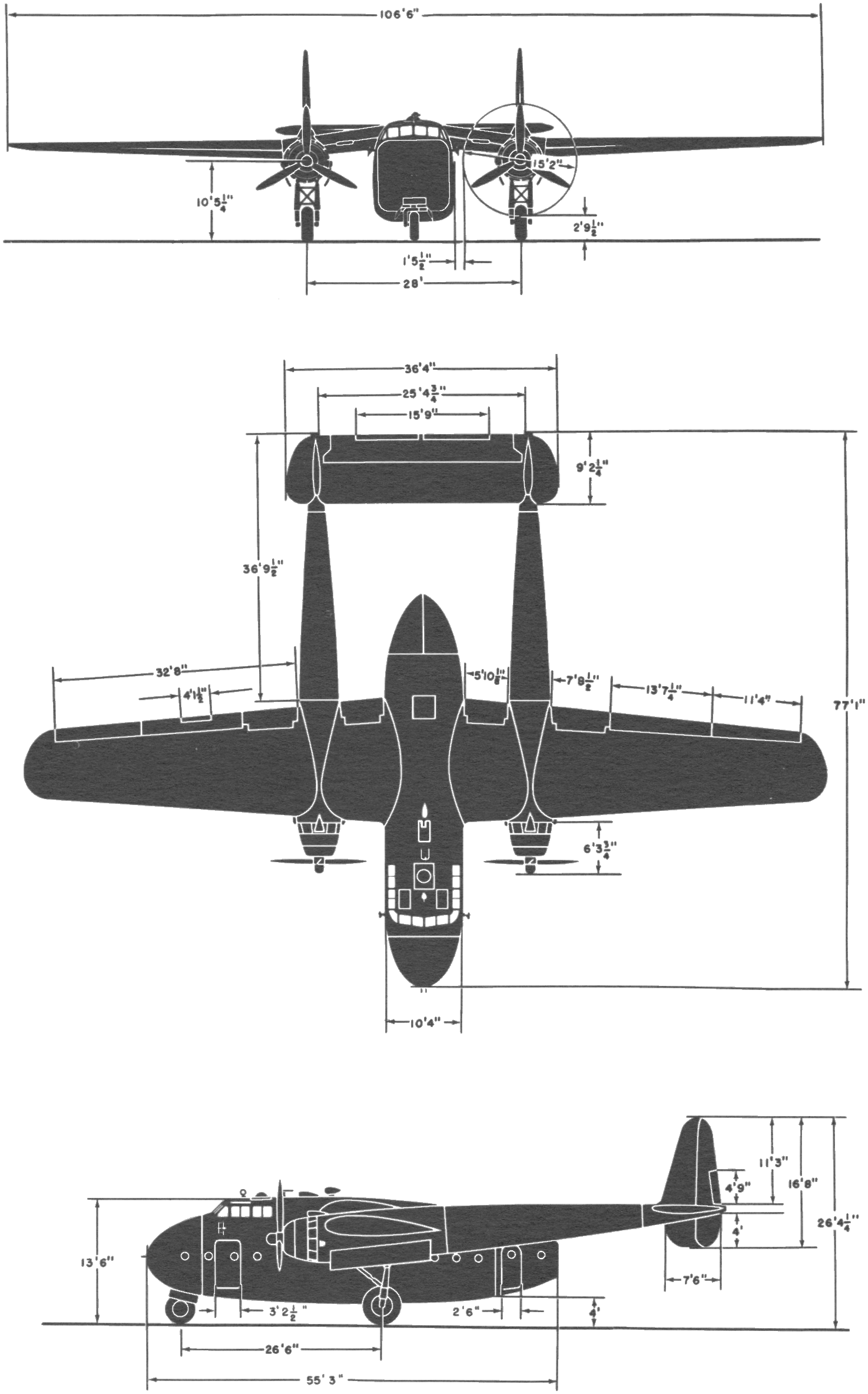
3-view line drawing of the Fairchild C-82A Packet

Data from United States Military Aircraft Since 1909 & American Military Transport Aircraft Since 1925

General characteristics

- Crew: three
- Capacity: 42 troops or 34 stretchers or 18,000 lb (8.16 t) cargo
- Length: 77 ft 1 in (23.50 m)
- Wingspan: 106 ft 5 1/2 in (32.45 m)
- Height: 26 ft 4 in (8.03 m)
- Wing area: 1,400 sq ft (130.1 m^{2})
- Empty weight: 32,500 lb (14,742 kg)
- Gross weight: 50,000 lb (22,680 kg)
- Max takeoff weight: 54,000 lb (24,494 kg)
- Fuel capacity: 2,600 US gal (2,200 imp gal; 9,800 L)
- Powerplant: 2 × Pratt & Whitney R-2800-85 18-cylinder, two-row radial engines, 2,100 hp (1,600 kW) each
- Propellers: 3-bladed Hamilton Standard Hydromatic, 15 ft 2 in (4.62 m) diameter

Performance

- Maximum speed: 248 mph (399 km/h, 216 kn) at 17,500 ft (5,300 m)
- Cruise speed: 218 mph (351 km/h, 189 kn) at 10,000 ft (3,050 m)
- Stall speed: 85 mph (137 km/h, 74 kn) with full flaps
- Range: 3,875 mi (6,236 km, 3,367 nmi)
- Service ceiling: 21,200 ft (6,500 m)
- Rate of climb: 950 ft/min (4.8 m/s)
- Takeoff distance to 50 ft (15m): 1,100 yd (3,300 ft; 1,000 m)
- Landing distance from 50 ft (15 m): 625 yd (1,875 ft; 572 m)

== Popular culture ==
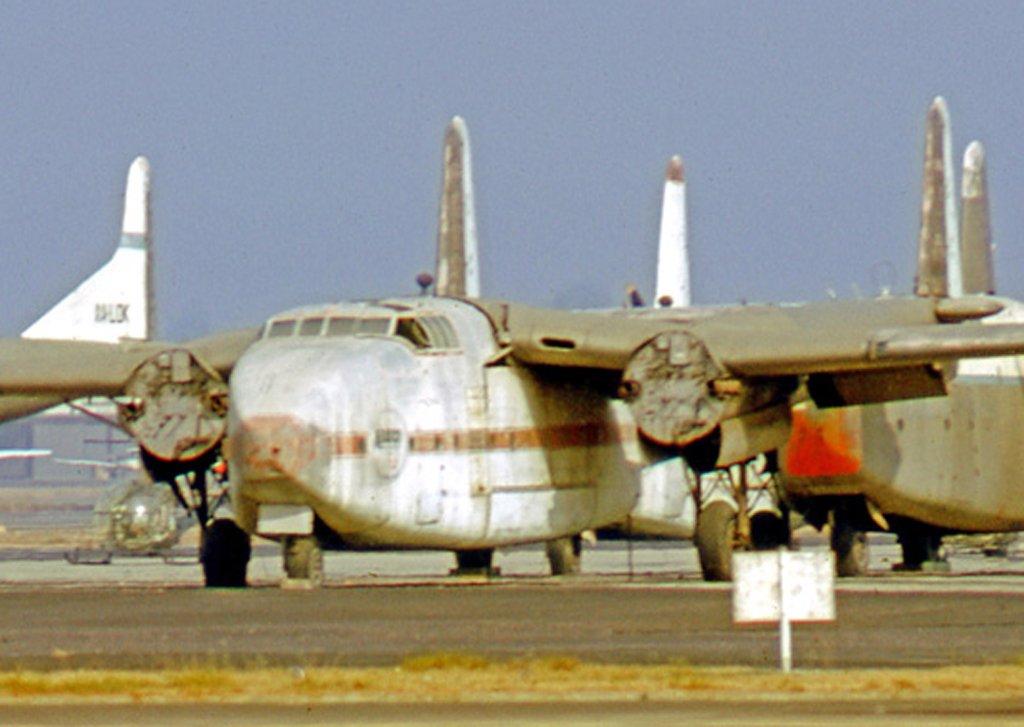
Fairchild C-82A N53228 painted in the markings of the fictional Arabco Oil Company for the 1965 film The Flight of the Phoenix, seen here in 1970

The C-82 is perhaps best known for its role in the 1964 novel The Flight of the Phoenix, and Robert Aldrich's original 1965 film version. Based on the novel by Elleston Trevor, the story features a C-82A Packet operated by the fictional Arabco Oil Company. It crashes in the Libyan desert, and is rebuilt by the passengers and crew, using one tail boom, and is then flown to safety. Such an aircraft was made for the movie, the Tallmantz Phoenix P-1. It was certified airworthy by the Federal Aviation Administration. Paul Mantz, possibly the greatest Hollywood stunt pilot in history with 25,000 flight hours, was killed with the cameras rolling when he bounced the skids of the craft down too hard in a touch-and-go, buckling and breaking the fuselage behind the wing, sending the craft nose-down hard into the desert, tumbling it completely over at 90 mph. Mantz was killed instantly.

=== Minor league baseball namesake ===
In 1953, the local minor league baseball team in Hagerstown, Maryland, was the Hagerstown Braves, so called because they were a minor league affiliate of the major league Milwaukee Braves. The Hagerstown team switched affiliation to the Washington Senators for the 1954 season. Instead of using the major league nickname, they chose the name Hagerstown Packets in tribute to the C-82. The Hagerstown Packets played in the Piedmont League during the 1954 and 1955 seasons.

== See also ==
Related development

- Fairchild C-119 Flying Boxcar
- Fairchild XC-120 Packplane

Aircraft of comparable role, configuration, and era

- Armstrong Whitworth AW.660 Argosy
- Fairchild C-123 Provider
- Gotha Go 244
- Nord Noratlas
