= Tallmantz Phoenix P-1 =

One-off single engined aircraft build for the 1965 film The Flight of the Phoenix

Phoenix P-1
- Tallmantz Phoenix P-1 as seen in the film

General information
- Type: Movie model
- Manufacturer: Tallmantz
- Designer: Otto Timm
- Number built: 1

History
- First flight: 29 June 1965

The Tallmantz Phoenix P-1 was an FAA-certified one-off aircraft built for the 1965 film production The Flight of the Phoenix and used in the picture's final aerial sequences. Its pilot Paul Mantz was killed in an accident during a touch-and-go maneuver to simulate a takeoff, after which the plane was replaced by a crudely modified North American O-47A.

== Design and development ==
In late 1964 or early 1965 Tallmantz Aviation, Inc. of Orange County, California was hired by 20th Century Fox to supervise the aerial sequences for their upcoming film The Flight of the Phoenix. Tallmantz Aviation owners Mantz and Frank Tallman were well-known movie stunt pilots, but in order to provide a realistic film prop, they hired Otto Timm, a highly respected aeronautical engineer and designer, to create a new aircraft.

Timm, following the storyline of the film, designed a hybrid plane using parts taken from other aircraft to resemble the reconstructed Fairchild C-82 Packet shown prominently in the film as having crashed in the desert.

The Tallmantz Phoenix P-1 was constructed from the following components:

- North American T-6 Texan engine, cowling, propeller, undercarriage wheels and cockpit controls
- Beechcraft C-45 Expeditor wings
- North American L-17 Navion wheel used as the P-1's tailwheel
- Tallmantz-designed and constructed fuselage, wing roots and skids

At its workshops near Santa Ana, California, Tallmantz built an open-cockpit fuselage consisting of a tubular steel framework surrounded by circular wooden bracing frames with a plywood covering, and the tail section was similar in construction. The skids were scratch-built from steel parts while wire bracing was added, made from clothesline to intentionally create a flimsy look. Although wheels were used, they were camouflaged in the final print of the film in order to make it appear that the aircraft was fitted with skids only.

Construction was completed in June 1965 and the completed model was submitted to the Federal Aviation Administration (FAA), which issued an airworthiness certificate on June 14.

The Phoenix "static" model as seen in the film

A second Phoenix model, built to closely resemble the main P-1 but not for actual flight, was constructed from Fairchild R4Q-1 (a USMC version of the C-82) components and was used extensively for ground shots, including some in which its engine was running.

== Film work ==
Principal photography for The Flight of the Phoenix began on April 26, 1965 at the 20th Century Fox Studios and 20th Century Fox Ranch, California. Other filming locations were Buttercup Valley and Pilot Knob Mesa, California. The flying sequences were all filmed at Pilot Knob Mesa, Winterhaven, located in Imperial Valley, California on the northern fringes of Yuma, Arizona.

In addition to the Phoenix P-1 prop, a number of other models were used in the film, including:

- Fairchild C-82A Packet, N6887C, flying shots
- Fairchild C-82A Packet, N4833V, outdoor location wreck
- Fairchild C-82A Packet, N53228, indoor studio wreck
- Fairchild R4Q-1 Packet, BuNo. 126589, non-flying Phoenix prop

Although Frank Tallman had flown the Phoenix P-1 for the first aerial shots on July 7, 1965, he injured his leg in a freak go-kart accident with his young son and was hospitalized. Second-unit director Oscar Rudolph called for another takeoff to ensure that a usable take would be filmed. Paul Mantz, who had completed the majority of the trial flights in the P-1, volunteered to stand in for his partner.

During filming on July 8, 1965, Mantz tried to simulate a takeoff by executing a touch-and-go maneuver. As Mantz descended for another low camera pass, his rate of descent at 90 mph exceeded the plane's aerodynamic capabilities. The resulting impact of the touchdown, coupled with the sudden drag caused by the aircraft's cobbled skid/wheel landing gear, caused the boom section behind the wings to fail, propelling the nose section forward, and the P-1 broke apart violently, killing Paul Mantz instantly. Stuntman Bobby Rose, also on board, was thrown clear and survived with a broken shoulder and pelvis. (Note: Sixty-four year old Billy Rose, considered the dean of Hollywood stuntmen, was involved in an accident on Mantz's first stunt-flying assignment for the film industry, when he had accidentally blanked out the controls. With the Tallmantz Phoenix P-1, Mantz had ensured that Rose's lashed-down position on the wing would not affect the flight.) The tail boom cracked just aft of the wing as the right skid hit the ground while the left skid and tail wheel were still in the air.

In the subsequent accident investigation, a number of factors were identified, including Mantz's misjudgment of the pullout speed of the Phoenix P-1. He contended with a nose-heavy configuration, with no flaps or adequate trim to slow the aircraft in its final descent. Investigators also investigated whether Mantz was impaired by alcohol consumption.

Mantz's body was flown back to Orange County in his B-25 camera plane N1203. The last credit of The Flight of the Phoenix pays tribute to him.

The North American O-47A used in the final sequence

Although principal photography finished on August 13, 1965, to complete filming, a North American O-47A ms/n 25-554 from the Air Museum in Claremont, California was modified to substitute for the Phoenix. Its canopy was removed, a set of skids was attached under the fuselage and a ventral fin was added to its tail. Filming using the O-47A was completed in October and November 1965. It appears in the film's final flying scenes, painted to resemble the Phoenix P-1.

The final film consisted of a mixture of footage that included the Phoenix P-1, the P-1 replica and the O-47A.

== Specifications (Phoenix P-1) ==
General characteristics

- Crew: one
- Capacity: one passenger
- Length: 42 ft 0 in (12.80 m)
- Empty weight: 4,550 lb (2,064 kg)
- Powerplant: 1 × Pratt & Whitney Wasp R-1340-AN-1 9-cylinder air-cooled radial engine, 600 hp (450 kW)
