= Flight of the Phoenix (2004 film) =

2004 film by John Moore

- Theatrical release poster
- Directed by: John Moore
- Written by: Scott Frank; Edward Burns
- Based on: The Flight of the Phoenix by: Elleston Trevor; The Flight of the Phoenix by Lukas Heller
- Produced by: John Davis; William Aldrich; Wyck Godfrey; T. Alex Blum
- Starring: Dennis Quaid; Giovanni Ribisi; Tyrese Gibson; Miranda Otto; Hugh Laurie
- Cinematography: Brendan Galvin
- Edited by: Don Zimmerman
- Music by: Marco Beltrami
- Production companies: Davis Entertainment; Aaldrich Group
- Distributed by: 20th Century Fox
- Release date: December 17, 2004
- Running time: 113 minutes
- Country: United States
- Language: English
- Budget: $45-75 million
- Box office: $34.5 million

Flight of the Phoenix is a 2004 American survival drama film directed by John Moore and written by Scott Frank and Edward Burns. The film is a remake of the 1965 film The Flight of the Phoenix, both based on the 1964 novel by Elleston Trevor, about a group of people who survive an aircraft crash in a desert and must build a new aircraft out of the old one to escape. It stars Dennis Quaid, Giovanni Ribisi, Tyrese Gibson, Miranda Otto and Hugh Laurie.

Flight of the Phoenix was filmed on location in the Namib Desert, and was released in the United States on December 17, 2004, by 20th Century Fox. The film was a box-office bomb and received generally mixed reviews, with critics negatively comparing it to the original 1965 film but praising the updated visuals, shorter runtime and action sequences.

== Plot ==
When an Amacore oil rig in the Gobi Desert of Mongolia proves unproductive, Captain Frank Towns and co-pilot A.J. are sent to shut down the operation and transport the crew – Amacore executive Ian, rig supervisor Kelly, Rodney, Davis, Liddle, Jeremy, Sammi, Rady, Kyle, Newman, and Dr. Gerber – out of the desert. However, en route to Beijing, a major dust storm disables one engine, forcing them to crash land their C-119 Flying Boxcar in an uncharted area of the Gobi Desert. Kyle falls to his death and the crash kills Dr. Gerber and Newman. Their cargo consists of used parts and tools from the rig, the rig's crew, and Elliott, a hitchhiker. When the dust storm ends, it becomes apparent that they are 200 miles (320 km) off course with only a month's supply of water. Jeremy thinks about walking to get help, but Rady explains that July is the hottest month in the Gobi, and that he won't make it.

In the middle of the night, Davis goes out to urinate without informing anybody, trips, gets lost in a sandstorm, and dies. The group panics after a failed search for him, and Kelly argues with Frank, who says that walking out of the desert would fail and that their only option is to await rescue. The group initially agrees but reconsiders after Elliott, claiming to be an aeronautical engineer, pitches a radical idea: he claims the surviving engine and wing are still completely intact, so they could rebuild the wreckage of their C-119 into a functional aircraft. Frank initially refuses, which causes Liddle to wander off on his own in protest. Frank attempts to find him. He comes across a valley littered with debris, cargo from the aircraft, which dropped out when the tail was torn open. Among the debris he discovers the bullet-ridden and stripped body of Kyle. Liddle says he will only go back with him if they build the plane, and Frank agrees.

They struggle for several weeks building the new aircraft, through dust storms, lack of water, and fighting amongst the group. Rady christens it Phoenix after the legendary bird. A problem evolves when a group of smugglers camp nearby; when Ian, A.J., and Rodney attempt to communicate. However, once Liddle spots Kyle's watch on a bandit's wrist, the bandits open fire, wounding Rodney. Frank kills one and captures the other, but after a short debate, Elliott unilaterally shoots the final bandit in the head, then rebukes the group for wasting water, time, and effort on a foolish mission, blaming Frank for allowing it. The two fight briefly and Elliott quits the project. Elliott refuses to continue until everyone verbally says, "please" and acknowledges that he is in charge.

After finishing the Phoenix Frank discovers that Elliott's aircraft design experience has been restricted to the design of model aircraft, much to the anger of everyone. While everyone argues, Ian quietly locates the Bandit's pistol and nearly shoots Elliott before Frank intervenes. In high wind, Liddle notices the plane slowly lifting on its own, proving Elliott's design theory, and the group stops fighting. However, the following storm buries most of their supplies, the original fuselage, and most of the Phoenix itself.

Frank rallies the group and inspires them to keep working to reach their loved ones and they eventually dig out the Phoenix. With only a few attempts to start the engine, Frank tries a risky procedure to clear the fuel cylinders, but it works, and the engine revs to life. The noise draws additional smugglers, who open fire on the craft and disable the rudder. Elliott manages to fix the problem during takeoff. The Phoenix plummets off the edge of a cliff at the end of their runway, but the additional airspeed from the fall allows Frank to pull up and fly away.

Through a series of photos, we see what became of the survivors when they made it back to civilization. All have been revitalized by the experience and have happy lives: Frank and A.J. start their own airline (appropriately named Phoenix Aviation), Sammi and his wife start their own restaurant (Jeremy and Rady are there to celebrate), Liddle is reunited with his wife and kids, Ian enjoys golf by taking early retirement, Kelly is boss on an ocean oil rig, and Elliott is wearing a flight suit on a Flight International magazine cover with the headline: "NASA's New Hope?"

== Cast ==
- Dennis Quaid as Frank Towns
- Giovanni Ribisi as Elliott
- Tyrese Gibson as A.J.
- Miranda Otto as Kelly
- Hugh Laurie as Ian
- Tony Curran as Rodney
- Kirk Jones as Jeremy
- Jared Padalecki as Davis
- Scott Michael Campbell as Liddle
- Jacob Vargas as Sammi
- Kevork Malikyan as Rady

== Production ==
In July 1997, it was reported that 20th Century Fox had struck a deal to develop a new adaptation of The Flight of the Phoenix with John Davis and William Aldrich, son of the original film's director Robert Aldrich, set to produce with Jim and John Thomas set to write the new script.

Co-writer Edward Burns was personally asked by Tom Rothman, who at the time was the president of Fox and had discovered Burns when he bought The Brothers McMullen as Fox Searchlight's first acquisition, to rewrite the film's dialogue. Burns said, "I probably did three drafts of it, and that was it. I never met Scott (Scott Frank, the other credited co-writer)." This is the only film Burns has writing credit on that he did not also direct.

Director John Moore scouted locations in Morocco and Australia before looking at, and quickly choosing, Namibia as the crash site. "Where most of the film takes place, was only a 20 minute-drive from the coastal town of Swakopmund." The Namib Desert location caused problems: cameras and other equipment had to be constantly cleaned of sand, and a "couple of hundred people were employed as 'dune groomers'" so that visual continuity could be maintained.

The set was the site of several mishaps:

- A ferry sank during transportation of a major set piece across a river, forcing the river bottom salvage of the aircraft fuselage.
- Jared Padalecki flipped his vehicle.
- Concluding the aerial filming sequences, the flying C-119G N15501 suffered a long gash under the right wing when a film truck backed under it and its driver misjudged the truck's height. A repair crew was flown in, the damaged segment re-skinned and the aircraft flown back across the Atlantic.
- On June 3, 2004, camera operator and second unit cinematographer Ciaran Barry was "filming behind a plywood barrier intended to protect his equipment" when an 800-pound "fiberglass model plane propelled down an elevated track, bounced off a sand dune in the Namibian desert and crashed into his hut."

For the latter, in October 2009 a Los Angeles jury awarded Barry $3.95 million in damages for broken legs and neurological damage he received during the accident; $1.3 million of the amount was awarded for lost future income.

A behind-the-scenes documentary, The Phoenix Diaries, was included on the DVD. In it, director John Moore can be seen screaming at the crew. Fox executives are also not shown in a flattering light. The documentary was not included in the 2006 Blu-ray release.

== Home video release ==
Flight of the Phoenix released March 1st, 2005 on DVD and VHS.

== Aircraft ==
Four Fairchild C-119 aircraft were used during the film:

- C-119G, N15501 - flying shots. (still flying as of 2007, now part of the Lauridsen Collection at the Buckeye Municipal Airport, February 2010.)
- C-119F, BuNo.131700 / N3267U - desert wreck.
- C-119F, BuNo.131691 - Phoenix film prop.
- C-119F, BuNo.131706 - Phoenix film prop.

A Phoenix that could be taxied but not flown was built for closeups. The Phoenix in flying scenes were done using a radio-controlled model and computer graphics.

== Reception ==
=== Box office ===
The film grossed $21,009,180 at the box office in the United States and another $14,012,317 outside the US, which brings the worldwide total of $35,021,497. The film's failure was partly due to its competition with Lemony Snicket's A Series of Unfortunate Events, Ocean's Twelve, and Meet the Fockers.

=== Critical reaction ===
On Rotten Tomatoes, Flight of the Phoenix holds an approval rating of 31% based on 118 reviews, with an average rating of 4.8/10. The site's critics consensus states: "What this update lacks in tension, it makes up for with generic action." On Metacritic, the film holds a weighted average score of 47 out of 100, indicating "mixed or average" reviews. Audiences polled by CinemaScore gave the film an average grade of "B−" on an A+ to F scale.

The main criticism for the film was its similarity to the original. John Anderson from Newsday said, "if you've seen the original, there's absolutely no difference in what happens. And very little reason to check it out." Aviation fan site Aerofiles said Flight of the Phoenix was "perhaps the worst remake ever of a classic film." Stephen Holden of The New York Times said the film is a "rickety update of the far superior 1965 movie" that "throws in every cheap trick in the manual to pump up your heartbeat [and] is so manipulative that the involuntary jolts of adrenaline it produces make you feel like a fool." Roger Ebert of the Chicago Sun-Times gave the film two out of four stars, writing "I'm not recommending it for those who know the original, but it might work nicely enough for those who have not."

The film did receive some praise. Scott Brown from Entertainment Weekly gave the film a B grade, saying "refreshingly, it's actually about action, albeit arbitrary action, and how it defines us and keeps us alive." Kevin Thomas of the Los Angeles Times gave the film four stars out of five, calling it "a worthy remake."

== See also ==
- Flight of the Phoenix (soundtrack)
- Coffman engine starter
- Lady Be Good (aircraft)
- Tragedy at Kufra
