= The Quiller Memorandum =

1966 British film by Michael Anderson

- Film poster by Tom Beauvais
- Directed by: Michael Anderson
- Screenplay by: Harold Pinter
- Based on: The Berlin Memorandum; 1965 novel by Elleston Trevor
- Produced by: Ivan Foxwell
- Starring: George Segal; Alec Guinness; Max von Sydow; Senta Berger; George Sanders; Robert Helpmann
- Cinematography: Erwin Hillier
- Edited by: Frederick Wilson
- Music by: John Barry
- Production company: Ivan Foxwell Productions
- Distributed by: Rank Film Distributors
- Release dates: 10 November 1966 (London-Premiere); 13 January 1967 (UK)
- Running time: 105 minutes
- Country: United Kingdom
- Language: English
- Budget: £912,757
- Box office: $1,500,000 (US/ Canada)

The Quiller Memorandum is a 1966 British neo noir eurospy film filmed in Deluxe Color and Panavision, adapted from the 1965 spy novel The Berlin Memorandum, by Elleston Trevor under the name "Adam Hall", screenplay by Harold Pinter, directed by Michael Anderson, featuring George Segal, Alec Guinness, Max von Sydow and Senta Berger. The film was shot on location in West Berlin and in Pinewood Studios, England. It was nominated for three BAFTA Awards, while Pinter was nominated for an Edgar Award for the script.

The film is a spy-thriller set in 1960s West Berlin, where agent Quiller is sent to investigate a neo-Nazi organisation.

The film had its world premiere on 10 November 1966 at the Odeon Leicester Square in the West End of London.

== Plot ==
Having lost two agents in Berlin, British intelligence chiefs arrange for American agent Quiller to report to the local controller, Pol, and continue the assignment, which is to find the headquarters of Phoenix, a neo-Nazi organisation.

Quiller leaves the Konigshof Hotel in West Berlin and confronts a man who has been following him, learning that it is his minder, Hengel. Hengel gives Quiller the few items found on his dead predecessor: a bowling alley ticket, a swimming pool ticket and a newspaper article about a Nazi war criminal found teaching at a school.

Pretending to be a reporter, Quiller visits the school featured in the article. The headmistress introduces him to a teacher who speaks English, Inge Lindt. After the interview, Quiller drives Inge to her flat and stops for a drink.

Confronting a man who seems to be following him, Quiller reveals that he really speaks German fluently. When he returns to his hotel, a passing porter bumps Quiller's leg with a suitcase on the steps. Quiller drives off, managing to shake Hengel, then notices men in another car following him. But Quiller has become drowsy from a drug that was injected by the porter at the hotel; when he passes out at a traffic stop, the other car pulls alongside and abducts him.

Quiller awakes in a dilapidated mansion, surrounded by many of the previous incidental characters. They are all members of Phoenix, led by the German aristocrat code-named Oktober. Though Quiller avoids answering questions about his agency, a doctor injects him with a truth serum, after which he reveals a few minor clues. In a feint to see if Quiller will reveal more by oversight, Oktober decides to spare his life.

Quiller comes round beside Berlin's Spree River. He steals a taxi, evades a pursuing vehicle and books himself into a squalid hotel. He calls Inge from there and arranges to meet her that evening at her flat. There he admits to her that he is really an "investigator" on the trail of neo-Nazis. After they have sex, she unexpectedly reveals that a friend was formerly involved with neo-Nazis and might know the location of Phoenix's HQ. The friend proves to be the swimming pool attendant, Hassler, who drives them to meet an old contact that he says knows a lot more. This turns out to be Inge's headmistress, who claims she turned in the teacher from the article and points out the dilapidated Phoenix mansion.

Quiller decides to enter the building, while Hassler and the headmistress leave one of their cars for him and Inge. But while he investigates, Quiller is confronted by Phoenix thugs. Oktober reveals they are moving base the next day and then that they have captured Inge. Quiller must reveal where his base is by dawn or Inge will be killed.

Allowed outside to think about it, Quiller finds he is being followed down the street by Oktober's men. After failing to shake them off, Quiller returns to his hotel, but then slips out though a side door to the small garage yard where his car is kept. He finds that a bomb has been strapped underneath and sets it on the bonnet of the car so that it will slowly slide and fall off due to vibration from the running engine. He manages to get over the wall of his garage stall as well as the adjoining one and then outside to the side of the building before detonation. The thugs believe him dead when they see the burning wreckage.

When Quiller reaches Pol's secret office in Berlin, he gives Pol the location of the building where he met Oktober. Pol dispatches a team to Phoenix's HQ, which successfully captures the neo-Nazis there, but there is no report of a woman being discovered.

Quiller returns to Inge's school and confronts her in her classroom. She states that she was lucky that they let her go and that there was no answer from the phone number he gave her for emergencies. Quiller suspects that not all the neo-Nazis have got away but can get Inge to admit nothing. As he leaves, he startles the headmistress on her way in.

== Cast ==
- George Segal as Quiller
- Alec Guinness as Pol
- Max von Sydow as Oktober
- Senta Berger as Inge Lindt
- George Sanders as Gibbs
- Robert Helpmann as Weng
- Robert Flemyng as Rushington
- Peter Carsten as Hengel
- Edith Schneider as Headmistress
- Günter Meisner as Hassler
- Philip Madoc as Oktober's Man (Man with brown trousers)

== Production ==
In March 1966 Rank announced it would make nine films with a total cost of £7.5 million of which it would provide £4 million. Two films were financed by Rank completely, a Norman Wisdom movie and a "doctor" comedy (Doctor on Toast which became Doctor in Trouble). The others were The Quiller Memorandum, Deadlier than the Male, Maroc Seven, Red Hot Ferrari (never made), The Fifth Coin (never made), The Battle of Britain and The Long Duel. It was co financed by National General Pictures the first feature from that company.

== Awards and critical reception ==
At the 1967 BAFTA Awards the film had nominations in the best Art Direction, Film Editing and Screenplay categories, but did not win. Harold Pinter was nominated for an Edgar Award in the Best Motion Picture category, but also didn't win.

In a contemporary review for The New York Times, critic Bosley Crowther wrote: "Clearly, 'The Quiller Memorandum' is claptrap done up in a style and with a musical score by John Barry that might lead you to think it is Art. But don't let it fool you for one minute–nor Mr. Segal, nor Senta Berger as the girl. The whole thing, including these two actors, is as hollow as a shell."

The review aggregator website Rotten Tomatoes reports that 60% of critics have given the film a positive rating, based on 15 reviews. Variety wrote that "it relies on a straight narrative storyline, simple but holding, literate dialog and well-drawn characters". Ian Nathan of Empire described the film as "daft, dated and outright confusing most of the time, but undeniably fun" and rated it with 3/5 stars.

=== Box office ===
According to Fox records, the film needed to earn $2,600,000 in rentals to break even and made $2,575,000, meaning it initially showed a marginal loss, but subsequent television and home video sales moved it into the black.

== Score and soundtrack ==
The Quiller Memorandum

Soundtrack album by John Barry
- Released: 1966
- Length: 34:37
- Label: Columbia Records

The mainly orchestral atmospheric soundtrack composed by John Barry was released by Columbia in 1966. Performed by Matt Monro, "Wednesday's Child" was also released as a single.

1. "Wednesday's Child" – main theme (instrumental)
2. "Quiller Caught" – The Fight
3. "The Barrel Organ"
4. "Oktober" – Walk from the River
5. "Downtown" (composed by Tony Hatch)
6. "Main Title Theme"
7. "Wednesday's Child" – vocal version (lyrics: Mack David / vocals: Matt Monro)
8. "The Love Scene" – The Old House
9. "Autobahn March"
10. "He Knows The Way Out"
11. "Night Walk in Berlin"
12. "Quiller and the Bomb"
13. "Have You Heard of a Man Called Jones?" – closing theme
