= Bury Him Among Kings =

1970 novel by Elleston Trevor

- First edition (UK)
- Author: Elleston Trevor
- Language: English
- Genre: War novel, Family saga
- Publisher: William Heinemann Ltd (UK); Doubleday (US);
- Publication date: UK; 18 May 1970; USA; 7 August 1970
- Publication place: United Kingdom
- Media type: Print (Hardback)
- Pages: 384
- ISBN: 0434793108
- Preceded by: A Place for the Wicked (1968) (as Elleston Trevor)
- Followed by: The Paragon (1975) published in the US as Night Stop (as Elleston Trevor)

Bury Him Among Kings is a 1970 novel by Elleston Trevor. The title is taken from the Inscription on the Tomb of the Unknown Warrior in Westminster Abbey in London commemorating a British soldier of World War I. The plot involves a fictitious British Army battalion, the Third Dukes, serving on the Western Front in France between 1914-1918; the cast of characters includes a wide range both of those serving and their friends and family at home.

== Background and publication ==
The novel was first published by William Heinemann in the UK and by Doubleday in the US, where it was the August 1970 Book of the Month Club selection. Elleston Trevor was then a successful and prolific novelist, best known in the US for his 1964 novel The Flight of the Phoenix and the 1965 film based on it. (Note: Trevor moved to the US in 1973 and became well-known for his Quiller series, writing as Adam Hall.)

It has much in common with the 1961 novel 'Covenant with Death' by his contemporary John Harris and the stories share a number of very similar episodes and characters e.g. the battalion's first march to the trenches. However, unlike Trevor, Harris' novel focuses on Kitchener's Army and covers the period from enlistment in August 1914 to the Somme in 1916.

Trevor himself was educated at an English public school, which he allegedly loathed; some of this is noticeable in his characterisation, although not overly so.

== Source of title ==
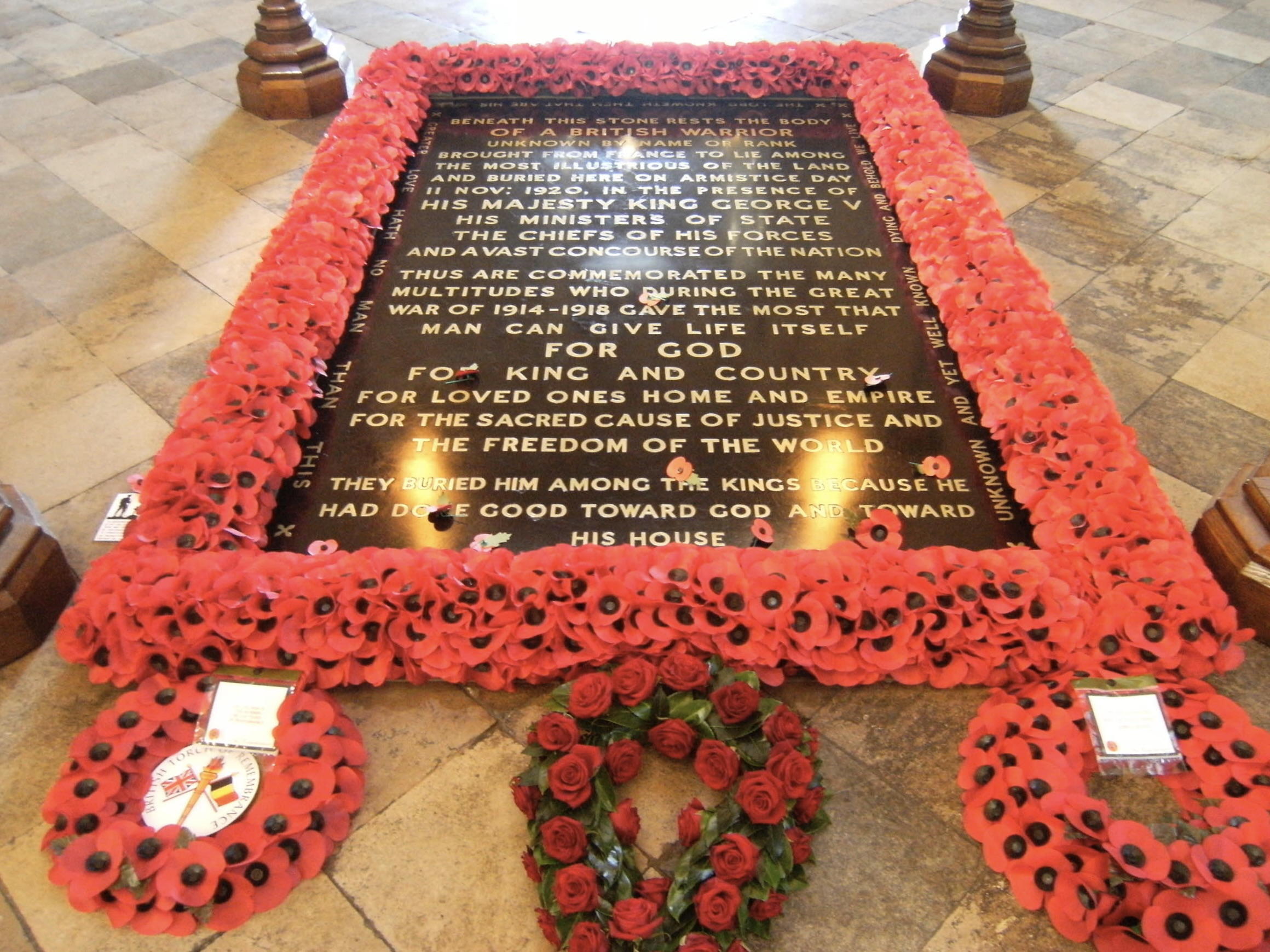
Tomb of the Unknown Warrior, Westminster Abbey.

The title is taken from the Inscription on the Tomb of the Unknown Warrior in Westminster Abbey in London commemorating a British soldier of World War I. It reads in full;

Beneath this stone rests the body of a British warrior, unknown by name or rank, brought from France to lie among the most illustrious of the land and buried here on Armistice Day, 11 Nov: 1920, in the presence of His Majesty King George V, his Ministers of State, the Chiefs of his forces and a vast concourse of the nation. Thus are commemorated the many multitudes who during the Great War of 1914 – 1918 gave the most that Man can give, life itself; for God, for King and country, for loved ones, home and empire, for the sacred cause of justice and the freedom of the world.

They buried him among the kings because he had done good toward God and toward his house.

The last line is an adapted version of 2 Chronicles, Chapter 24, Verse 16, King James Version; And they buried him in the city of David among the kings, because he had done good in Israel, both toward God, and toward his house.

== Plot summary ==
The family featured here are the Talbots, an upper-middle-class family living at Ashbourne Manor in the London suburbs; the actual location is not given but clues suggest Richmond, London. (Note: The house is within 30-40 minutes driving distance from central London in 1914, on the way home they pass the Grenadier Guards barracks in Chelsea and cross the River Thames.)

The Talbots are composed of Aubrey, his younger brother Victor, his 19-year-old sister Pam, his father William, editor of a Fleet Street newspaper and his wife Lady Eleanor, who is the emotional heart of both family and book. It opens on 4 August 1914, the day war began between the British and German Empires. Aubrey and Victor enlist in the 3rd Dukes, as does their family chauffeur Freddie Kemp and Tom Follett, an orphan working as a junior gardener at Ashbourne. Pam joins the Red Cross in London as an ambulance driver.

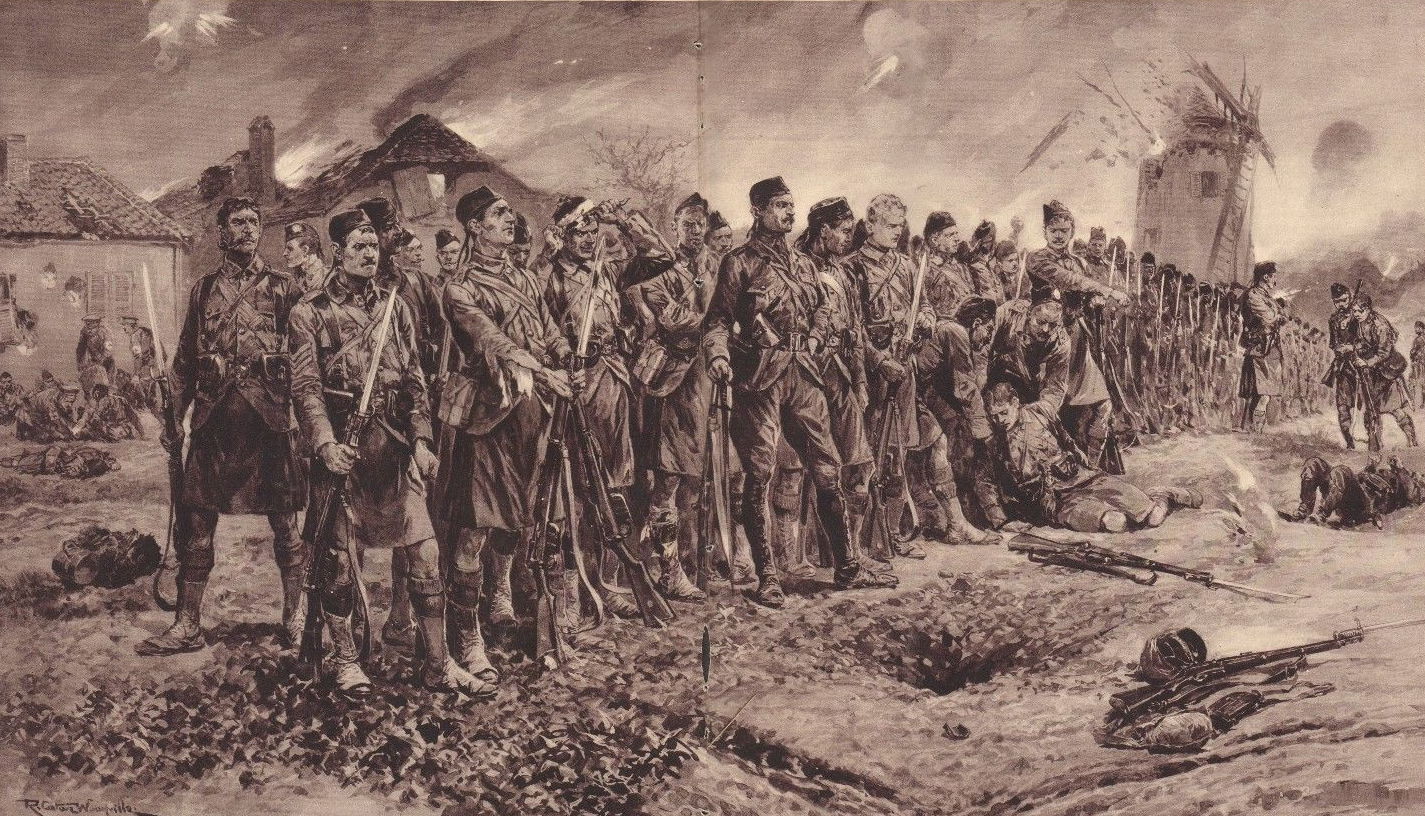
A Territorial Force unit, the London Scottish at Messines, 31 October 1914; the Dukes would have been similar.

The provenance of the 3rd Dukes is uncertain but the novel has it serving on the Western Front before Christmas 1914. This makes it part of the Territorial Force rather than the better known Kitchener's Army, whose first units did not reach France until early 1915.

The Talbot circle includes Hugh Sadler, their neighbour, long-term friend and conscientious objector who is shunned by his parents as a result and Diana Lovell, sister of Aubrey's fellow officer Julian, who becomes a nurse in France and later Aubrey's fiancée. A small group of enlisted men in the Dukes features prominently; the Talbot family chauffeur Freddie Kemp, Tom Follett, an orphan employed as a junior gardener at Ashbourne, Geoff Tufnell, Wiggy Bennett, Percy Stokes and Sam Quincy, an American.

In general, the book focuses more on the emotional links between the characters and their development, rather than details of the fighting itself; unusually for books of this era, the Battle of the Somme is barely mentioned. The central theme is loyalty, both to friends and to ideals.

It provides a wide range of the motives driving personal choices; Aubrey and Freddie enlist because they think it is their duty to do so, Victor to escape from what he sees as the restrictions placed on him by his family and Aubrey in particular. Hugh and Geoff are the moral centre of the novel; one enlists and the other does not, but both have deeply held beliefs and Geoff also comes to oppose the war. Others join for adventure, Wiggy Bennett to provide support for his widowed mother.

While one or two episodes seem unlikely e.g. Aubrey's confrontation with a senior staff officer who orders the continuation of a pointless attack, it is generally a well-balanced portrayal that does not avoid the realities of the time and place. Some significant characters die while the different living conditions and expectations of the social classes are referenced, although rarely criticised. The standard 'selfish worker at home, striking for pay while their colleagues die in France' puts in an appearance but so do those working and dying in munitions factories.

The novel ends in Trafalgar Square where it began, with the crowds celebrating in Armistice Day, 11 November 1918; the emotions are similar but very different in motivation.

== Reviews ==
Kirkus Reviews criticized the book's characterization as "at best an assumption" but also noted that Bury Him Among Kings "reads with the proficiency which comes with long practice." Martin Levin of The New York Times wrote that "Mr. Trevor catches the spirit of the times." Publishers Weekly called the book "an intensely moving and human portrait of that bloody and frequently pointless time."
