= Rise of the Phoenix =

Rise of the Phoenix may refer to:

- Rise of the Phoenix (album), a 2012 album by Before the Dawn
- Rise of the Phoenix (video game), first released in 1993
- The Rise of the Phoenix, a 2017 album by Chanté Moore

== See also ==
- The Rise of Phoenixes, a 2018 Chinese TV series
- Rize of the Fenix, a 2012 album by Tenacious D
- "Rise Like a Phoenix", a 2014 song by Conchita Wurst
- Rising Phoenix, a 2020 documentary about paralympic games
- The Flight of the Phoenix (disambiguation)
