= Quiller =

Fictional character

- First appearance: The Berlin Memorandum (1965; U.S. title The Quiller Memorandum)
- Last appearance: Quiller Balalaika (1996)
- Created by: Elleston Trevor as Adam Hall
- Portrayed by: George Segal in The Quiller Memorandum (1966 film); Michael Jayston in Quiller (TV series)

In-universe information
- Gender: Male
- Nationality: English

Quiller is a fictional character created by English novelist Elleston Trevor. Quiller, whose one-word name is a pseudonym, works as a spy, and he is the hero of a series of 19 Cold War thrillers written under the pseudonym Adam Hall, and became Trevor's most popular character.

The books concern a solitary, highly capable operative who works, usually on his own, for a British government organization, referred to as "The Bureau", which "doesn't exist". Quiller narrates his adventures in the first person, addressing the reader in an informal tone. He was named after the real-life Cornish writer Sir Arthur Quiller-Couch.

== Characterisation ==
Quiller is a highly skilled driver, pilot, diver, linguist and martial artist. In his choice of self-defence methods, he favours Shotokan karate, much like Trevor himself. Additionally, Quiller has knowledge of Chin Na—a related, complementary art that relies on advanced joint manipulation. He does not carry a firearm "in peacetime". Indeed, this may mean that he has not carried one since World War II, reasoning that if he were caught, he would be able to explain anything he was carrying except a gun. He also believes that guns give their carriers a dangerously false sense of security, and dislikes the noise they make. His resistance to interrogation is exceptional and he has managed to keep the "suffix-nine" designation indicating he is "reliable under torture". He has a morbid dislike of dogs, especially guard dogs. During times of extreme stress, he develops a nervous tic in his left eyelid.

Quiller's narration of the tradecraft he routinely employs is one of the defining elements of the novels. There are detailed descriptions of "shadowing," the art of following targets and evading surveillance. He is almost always reluctant to take on a mission and he regularly tells the reader all Bureau operatives have an option to refuse. Manipulation to get him to agree to the mission is usually necessary.

In contrast to the glamorous lifestyles depicted in the James Bond canon, Quiller's operational locations are almost always unfriendly (Warsaw in winter, the Sahara under the blazing sun, etc.). He is aware his expenses will be scrutinised minutely. Most of the books feature an extended, detailed scene of hand-to-hand combat. His missions are organised under the control of a director in the field, and a control operating from the bureau in London. Several of these characters recur in the books; some are heartily disliked by Quiller, and he comments on how much he doesn't want to work with them.

== Novels ==
- The Berlin Memorandum (1965)
- The 9th Directive (1966)
- The Striker Portfolio (1968)
- The Warsaw Document (1971)
- The Tango Briefing (1973)
- The Mandarin Cypher (1975)
- The Kobra Manifesto (1976)
- The Sinkiang Executive (1978)
- The Scorpion Signal (1979)
- The Peking Target (1981)
- Quiller/Northlight (1985)
- Quiller's Run (1988)
- Quiller KGB (1989)
- Quiller Barracuda (1990)
- Quiller Bamboo (1991)
- Quiller Solitaire (1992)
- Quiller Meridian (1993)
- Quiller Salamander (1994)
- Quiller Balalaika (1996)

== Short story ==
- "Last Rites" (Espionage Magazine, April 1986)

== Adaptations ==
- The Quiller Memorandum (1966): Film based on the first book in the series, adapted under its American title and starring George Segal.
- Quiller (1975): British television series featuring Michael Jayston.
