= The Berlin Memorandum =

1965 spy novel

First edition (UK)

The Berlin Memorandum (UK title, published by Collins; published as The Quiller Memorandum in the US by Simon & Schuster), is a 1965 spy novel written by Elleston Trevor (under the pseudonym Adam Hall). It is the debut novel of the character Quiller, who was ultimately featured in a series of 19 thrillers, until Trevor's death in 1995, having been Trevor's most popular character.

== Reception ==
In Britain, The Bookseller reported that the novel was one of Collins' best selling works in spring 1965. Portions of it were serialized in the Daily Mail. By June 1965, The Publishers Association had The Berlin Memorandum in its top 5 best sellers list for fiction in Britain.

The work won the 1966 Edgar Allan Poe Award for Best Novel. It also won the 1966 Grand Prix de Littérature Policière for best international crime novel.

Anthony Boucher, writing for The New York Times Book Review, subsequently said that The Quiller Memorandum had attracted a "large body of readers" and that it was "one of the small handful of truly distinguished spy novels of the 1960s." It has been considered part of a wave of spy novels influenced by John le Carré's groundbreaking 1963 work The Spy Who Came in from the Cold. In fact, Trevor later said he had been inspired by reading a review of (but not, fearing he might take too close an influence, the actual text of) The Spy Who Came in from the Cold.

== Adaptation and subsequent events ==
It was adapted as the 1966 film The Quiller Memorandum starring George Segal based on a screenplay written by Harold Pinter. The film took many departures from the novel, including making Quiller an American, and Trevor was unhappy with Pinter's work on it.

Collins then republished the novel as The Quiller Memorandum in the UK in 1967, to capitalise on the film.

The Quiller Memorandum was republished in 2004 by Forge Books, with an introduction by Otto Penzler.

== Plot summary ==
Quiller is introduced as a serving British intelligence officer in a black organization called "the Bureau" and as a veteran of clandestine service during World War II. Quiller never states which service he worked in during wartime, and we are not told the year in which that organization was founded. It is, however, mentioned the original explicit purpose of the Bureau was to prevent any possible resurgence of German militarism, any situation that might lead to something resembling a Fourth Reich.

Numerous governments offered him medals for his actions in the war, but he refused them all. During and after his wartime service, Quiller became a specialist in understanding Nazi clandestine organizations and their activities, particularly the so-called "ratlines" used by Nazis to escape from justice. Most of the book takes place in 1965, by which time Quiller has been seconded by the Bureau to secretly provide large amounts of useful intelligence information to West Germany's main war crimes investigation agency, the Z Commission. Quiller is tired and wants to return home, but the Bureau persuades him to investigate the plans of a Nazi secret society. He agrees to do so in part because that secret society has just assassinated a friend and colleague whom he had deeply respected.
