= Squadron Airborne =

1955 novel by Elleston Trevor

- First edition (UK)
- Author: Elleston Trevor
- Language: English
- Published: 1955 by Heinemann
- Publication place: United Kingdom
- Media type: Print (Hardback)
- Pages: 220 pp
- ISBN: 0532152700

Squadron Airborne (also titled "Squadron Airborn") is a 1955 novel by Elleston Trevor. The plot revolves around the fighter pilots and auxiliary personnel of a fictional Spitfire squadron in September 1940. At the beginning of the story a newly trained 19-year-old pilot, Peter Stuyckes (pronounced "Stewks") arrives at Westhill (a fictitious Home Counties aerodrome near a fictitious town called Melbury), joining an established squadron already in the thick of the fighting. Less than a week later, after a number of aerial battles and many sub-plots concerning airmen and ground staff alike, the squadron is transferred to Lincolnshire for rest and refit, having suffered many casualties. This was the eighth novel to be released by Trevor under his own name although he had published many other titles under pseudonyms.

== Plot summary ==
Pilot Officer Stuyckes arrives at Westhill and immediately suffers a mishap on a borrowed bicycle on presenting himself at his new Flight. This provokes mild amusement among his fellows and foreshadows a near-disaster when, on being taken up for an introductory flight by Squadron Leader Charlie Mason, he is so preoccupied with making a textbook landing approach that he forgets to lower his undercarriage and has to be sarcastically reminded. Keen to make an impression, he succeeds in downing a Luftwaffe bomber on his first sortie but is attacked and seriously damaged, forcing him to make a belly landing for real although impressing the ground staff with how well he manages this.

While the green Stuyckes is adapting to life on operations, it is seen that the more experienced members of Westhill Squadron (codenamed "Vestal" and never referred to by number in the book) have their own share of problems. Even Charlie Mason, regarded as invincible by many of the squadron, is beginning to suffer doubt before the end of the story; many characters do worse,

- Bob White is suffering from battle fatigue, having earlier flown in the Battle of France and in the Battle of Dunkirk and the conviction that he is fated to die soon. After he breaks down in a drunken rage, he is sent on leave to recover even though Mason and the station medical officer privately agree that he will probably kill himself anyway.
- Macklin, another veteran of the Battle of France, dies on Stuyckes' second sortie when his aircraft hits the ground (mentioned by another character during debriefing).
- Hodges, convinced that his wife has been killed in a Luftwaffe raid on Southampton but unable to make contact by telephone, first disposes of five enemy aircraft and then crashes his Spitfire into a sixth (in accordance with one of Mason's dicta, that given the balance of strength at that time in the battle, losing one fighter for five of the enemy destroyed is still a net loss for the R.A.F.). A later call from Southampton police confirms that Mrs Hodges has indeed died, but that Hodges could not possibly have known this.
- Brewer is attacked, cut off from the rest of the squadron, while his repeated calls for assistance ("Can anyone get that bastard?") go unanswered and apparently unheard, and he is shot down by his persistent attacker.
- Spencer, Mason's closest friend, allows his attention to wander for a short time in a battle, leading him to spend three seconds in a Messerschmitt Bf 109's gunsight and take a three-second burst from its MG 151 cannon, destroying his Spitfire instantly. The previous night, Spencer had opted not to sleep with his girlfriend to get a good night's rest before returning to action, and Mason had told him that he was to be nominated for a Bar to his Distinguished Flying Cross. On going through Spencer's personal effects, Mason finds a letter stating that he, Spencer, had a premonition that he was to die soon and hoped that when it came it was quick and did not inconvenience the rest of the squadron. In connection with Hodges's earlier death, this leads Mason to wonder if he too will experience the same foreknowledge of his own death.
- Carsman, a tough Northerner transferred to Westhill as a replacement a few days after Stuyckes's arrival, is listed as a casualty along with Stuart and Rooke in the final chapter.

Stuyckes continues to experience an uphill struggle. On another early mission he is forced to bail out (sustaining superficial injuries after landing in a bramble patch), leading one of the Women's Auxiliary Air Force (WAAFs), twenty-year-old Daisy Caplin, who feels a strong sisterly attachment to him, to believe he has been killed when he does not return with the rest of the squadron. After a WAAF officer, who is hiding her grief over a letter she is carrying in her uniform pocket, has interviewed Daisy and delicately inquired if she is illicitly pregnant (the phrase used is "Are you in trouble?"), Daisy sees Stuyckes walking around and only then learns that he had parachuted to safety and made his own way back to base.

At the end of the story, Stuyckes is in hospital after a more severe crash-landing, although making light of his injuries and well enough to pester the hospital staff to allow him to telephone Mason to inquire after the squadron's welfare. The squadron has already made its last operation before moving to Lincolnshire and was able to send seven aircraft (out of twelve) in response to a raid on the aerodrome, of whom at least three are mentioned as killed in Mason's conversation with Stuyckes. In addition to Mason and the injured Stuyckes, only two other pilots are mentioned as being alive, including one (Collins) who has been a byword for escaping by parachute throughout the story and has done so again.

Throughout the story, various romantic entanglements are explored. There is a suggestion that Stuyckes had his first sexual experience with a woman named Marcia on the night before he arrived at Westhill; two of the ground staff, both unhappily married, have a passionate affair which is abruptly ended by the transfer of one of them to Oban and Mason becomes aware that Felicity, actually a local heiress working as a war volunteer in the Royal Voluntary Service (WRVS) while hosting five schoolboy evacuees, is strongly attracted to him. Despite the squadron's move to Lincolnshire, Mason resolves to return as soon as he has leave, as he finds himself returning Felicity's affection with equal force. The book closes with the departure of the survivors of the squadron, other than the hospitalised Stuyckes, and the arrival of a new squadron at the damaged but still operational aerodrome.

== Technical error ==
In Chapter Seven, Leading Aircraftsman Cornelius is paraded before Flight Lieutenant Robey to be disciplined for "breaking out of camp" (in this case, a short unauthorised absence, not via the official exit, to socialise privately with a WAAF). Robey punishes him with a reprimand. There are several issues with this:

- Cornelius and his fellows are relieved that the punishment is not more severe. In fact, a reprimand is considered a more serious punishment than would normally be imposed for a minor offence and the "Confined to Camp" punishment imposed on his girlfriend carries less weight although both speak of it as if it were more.
- A Leading Aircraftsman is not an NCO and hence is too junior to be reprimanded.
- Robey is mentioned later as being concerned not to harass engineers and fitters given the extreme hard work they are performing at this crucial stage of the Battle of Britain.

It is likely that the author confused the term "reprimand" with "admonishment". A person who is admonished is awarded a documented scolding which is considered far lighter than an official reprimand (and which can be applied to personnel below NCO rank). Later in the book, Cornelius is spoken to by Mason, after ignoring orders to take shelter while the station was under attack and Mason mentions a severe reprimand as a possible consequence for any repetition. (Mason also thanks Cornelius for his bravery and undertakes to recommend him for a decoration.)

== Chronology ==
No dates are mentioned in the book, but the reference to a raid on Southampton and the arrival of unusually large Luftwaffe formations a few days later along with bombing attacks on towns would suggest that the story begins on or about 10 September 1940.
