= The Flight of the Phoenix (novel) =

1964 novel by Elleston Trevor

- First edition (UK)
- Author: Elleston Trevor
- Language: English
- Published: 1964
- Publisher: Heinemann (UK); Harper & Row (US)
- Publication place: United Kingdom
- Media type: Print (Hardback)
- Pages: 242 pp
- OCLC: 1280808
- Dewey Decimal: 823.914
- LC Class: PR6039.R518

The Flight of the Phoenix is a 1964 novel by Elleston Trevor. The plot involves the crash of a transport aircraft in the middle of a desert and the survivors' desperate attempt to save themselves. The book was the basis for the 1965 film The Flight of the Phoenix starring James Stewart and the 2004 remake titled Flight of the Phoenix. The Flight of the Phoenix came at the midpoint of Trevor's career and led to a bidding war over its film rights.

== Plot summary ==
Pilot Frank Towns and navigator Lew Moran are ferrying a mixed bag of passengers from the Jebel oil town in the Libyan desert, among them oil workers, two British soldiers, and a German who was visiting his brother. An unexpected sandstorm forces the aircraft down, damaging it, killing two of the men, and severely injuring the German. In the book, the action takes place in the Libyan part of the Sahara.

The survivors wait for rescue but the storm has blown them far off course, far away from a search area. After several days, Captain Harris marches toward a distant oasis together with another passenger. His aide, Sergeant Watson feigns a sprained ankle to stay behind. A third man follows them. Days later, Harris barely manages to return to the crash site. The others are lost.

As the water begins to run out, Stringer, a precise, arrogant English aeronautical engineer, proposes a radical solution: rebuild a new aircraft from the wreckage of the old twin-boom aircraft, using the undamaged boom and adding skids to take off. The men set to work.

At one point, a nearby party of nomadic tribesmen is spotted. Captain Harris decides to seek their help. This time, Sergeant Watson outright refuses to accompany him. Instead another survivor, a Texan named Loomis, volunteers. The next day, Towns finds their looted bodies, throats cut, and the nomads gone.

Later, Towns learns that Stringer designs model aircraft, not full-scale planes. Fearing the effect on morale, he and Moran keep their discovery secret, believing Stringer's plan is doomed. However, the aircraft is reborn, like the mythical Phoenix rising from its own ashes. It flies the remaining passengers, strapped to the outside of the fuselage, to an oasis and civilization.

== Film adaptations ==
The book was the basis of a 1965 film starring James Stewart, Richard Attenborough, and Hardy Krüger. The 2004 remake featuring Dennis Quaid was also based on the novel, although it was re-located to the Gobi Desert in Asia.

== See also ==
- Coffman engine starter
- Lady Be Good (aircraft)
- Tragedy at Kufra
