= North American O-47 =

American observation aircraft during WWII

O-47
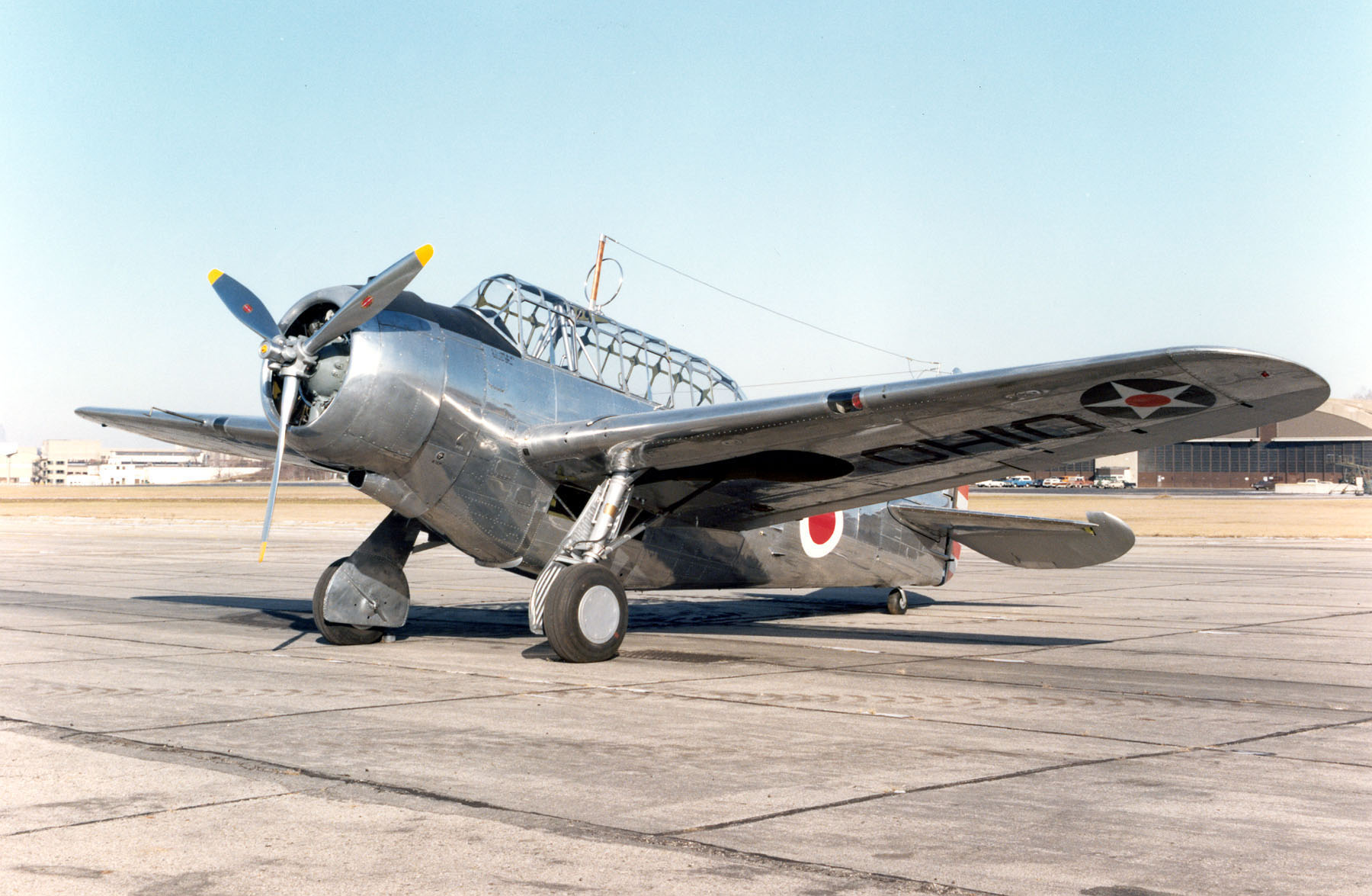
- An O-47B at National Museum of the United States Air Force

General information
- Type: Observation
- Manufacturer: North American Aviation
- Primary user: United States Army Air Corps
- Number built: 239

History
- Introduction date: 1937
- First flight: November 1935

The North American O-47 is an American observation fixed-wing aircraft monoplane designed in the mid-1930s and used by the United States Army Air Corps during World War II. It has a low-wing configuration, retractable landing gear, and a three-blade propeller.

== Design and development ==
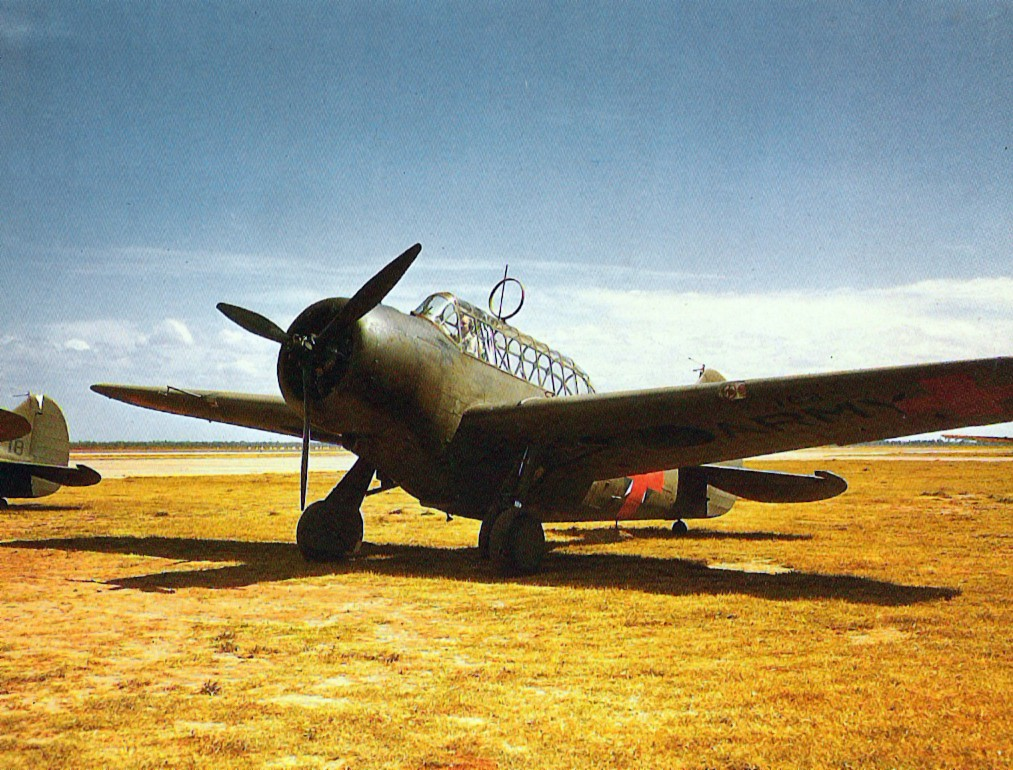
A "red force" O-47B during maneuvers in 1941.

The O-47 was developed as a replacement for the Thomas-Morse O-19 and Douglas O-38 observation biplanes. It was larger and heavier than most preceding observation aircraft and its crew of three sat in tandem under the long canopy. Windows in the deep belly overcame the obstacle that the wings presented to downward observation and photography. The design for the XO-47 prototype originated in 1934 with General Aviation Manufacturing, a subsidiary of North American Aviation, as the GA-15. The Air Corps ordered 174 O-47s in 1937 to 1938, 93 of which were assigned to National Guard units. In 1938, the Army ordered 74 O-47Bs with a redesigned engine cowling for better cooling, an uprated engine, and improved radio equipment.

== Operational history ==
Training maneuvers in 1941 demonstrated the shortcomings of the O-47. Single-engined light airplanes like the Piper L-4 and Stinson L-5 proved more capable of operating with ground troops, while fighters and twin engine bombers showed greater ability to perform recon and photo duties. Thus, O-47s during World War II, except for those caught at overseas bases by the Japanese attacks, were relegated to secondary duties such as towing targets, coastal patrol, and anti-submarine patrol.

== Variants ==
XO-47
one built, serial number 36-145 in Dundalk, Maryland, 850 hp (634 kW) Wright R-1820-41 engine
O-47A
164 built in Inglewood California, 975 hp (727 kW) Wright R-1820-49 engine
O-47B
74 built, minor improvements and a 1,060 hp (790 kW) Wright R-1820-57 engine installed, plus an extra 50 gallon fuel tank

== Operators ==
United States

- United States Army Air Corps

== Surviving aircraft ==
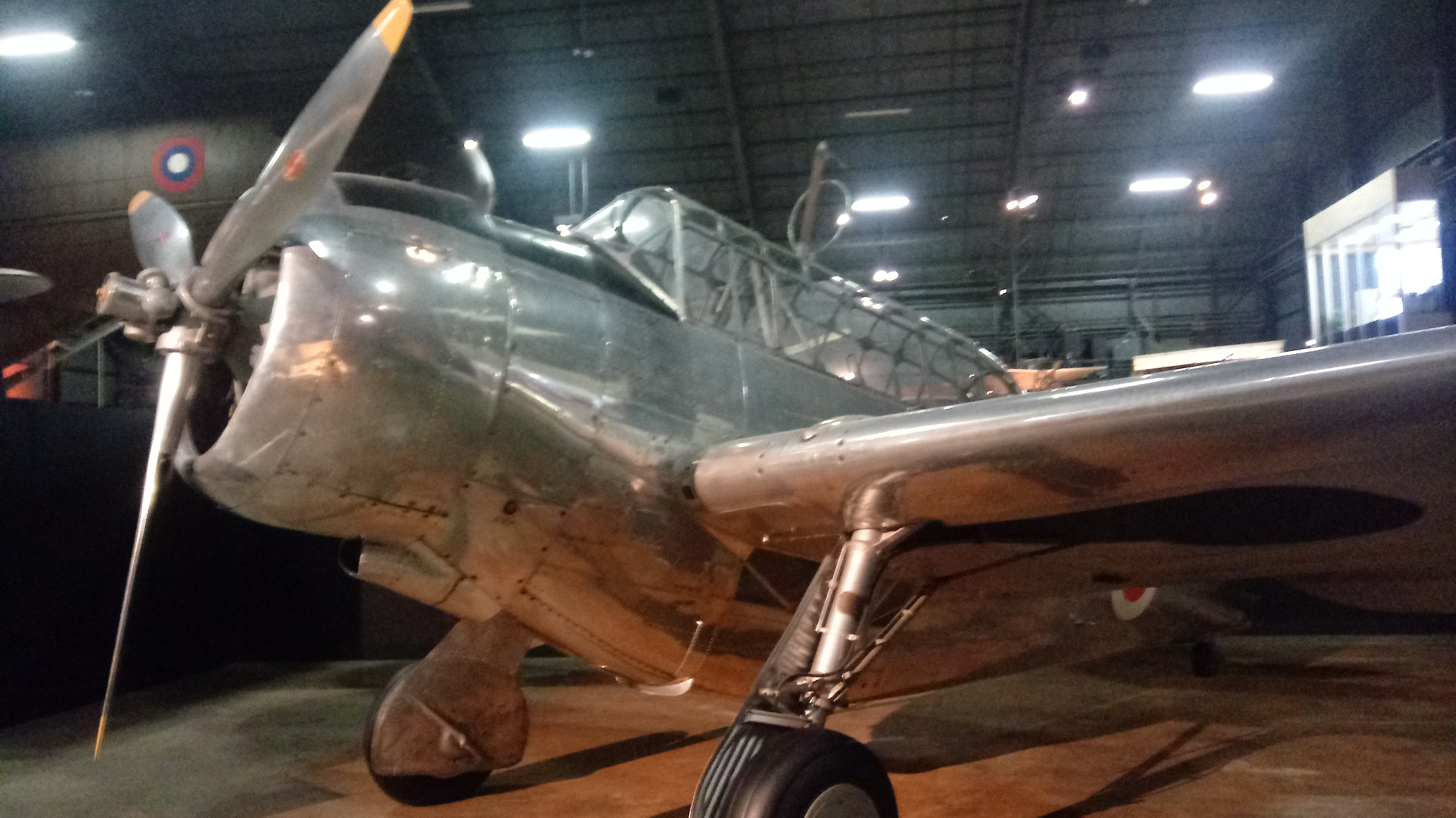
O-47B at Wright-Patterson National Museum of the USAF

- 37-279 – O-47A in storage at the Paul E. Garber Preservation, Restoration, and Storage Facility of the National Air and Space Museum in Suitland, Maryland.
- 39-098 – O-47B owned by James P. Harker of Blaine, Minnesota. It was previously placed on loan to the Combat Air Museum in Topeka, Kansas by its owner William A. Dempsay, but was sold as of June 2014.
- 39-112 – O-47B on static display at the National Museum of the United States Air Force in Dayton, Ohio. It is displayed in the markings of an O-47A belonging to the 112th Observation Squadron of the Ohio National Guard. It was acquired in 1978 from Loren L. Florey Jr., of Eden Prairie, Minnesota and was restored by the 179th Consolidated Aircraft Maintenance Squadron, Ohio Air National Guard, Mansfield, Ohio.
- Composite – O-47A under restoration at the Planes of Fame Air Museum in Chino, California. It is made up of serial numbers 38-284 and 38-295.

== Specifications (O-47A) ==
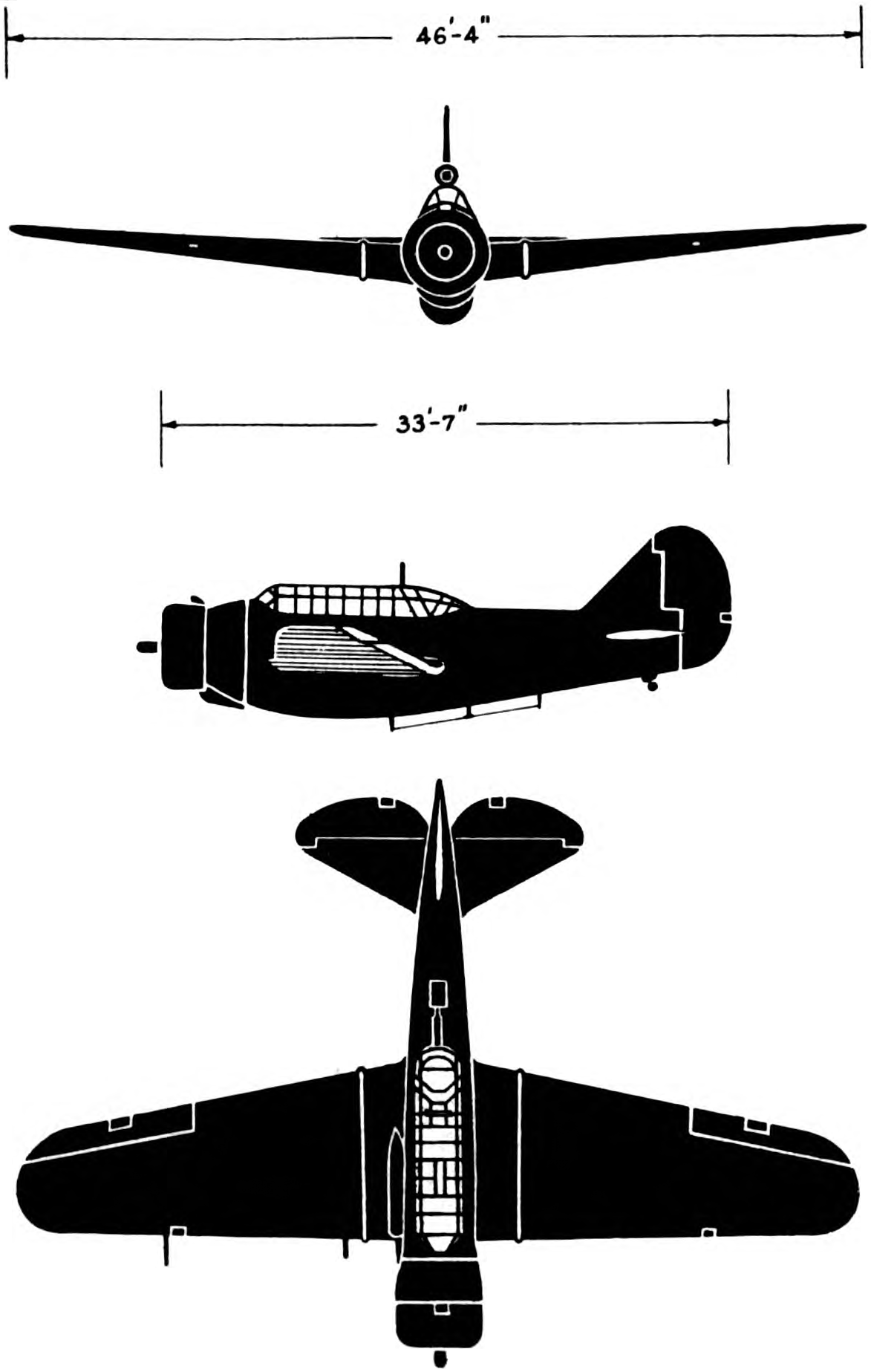
3-view silhouette of the North American O-47

Data from United States Military Aircraft Since 1909

General characteristics

- Crew: three (pilot, copilot-observer, gunner)
- Length: 33 ft 7 in (10.24 m)
- Wingspan: 46 ft 4 in (14.1 m)
- Height: 12 ft 2 in (3.7 m)
- Wing area: 350 sq ft (32.5 m^{2})
- Empty weight: 5,980 lb (2,712 kg)
- Gross weight: 7,636 lb (3,464 kg)
- Powerplant: 1 × Wright R-1820-49 radial, 975 hp (727 kW)

Performance

- Maximum speed: 221 mph (356 km/h, 192 kn)
- Cruise speed: 200 mph (322 km/h, 170 kn)
- Range: 840 mi (1,352 km, 730 nmi)
- Service ceiling: 23,200 ft (7,100 m)
- Rate of climb: 1,470 ft/min (7.5 m/s)

Armament

- 1 × fixed forward-firing .30-cal (7.62 mm) machine gun (200 rounds) in starboard wing
- 1 × flexible .30-cal (7.62 mm) machine gun (600 rounds) in rear cockpit

== See also ==
Aircraft of comparable role, configuration, and era

- Curtiss O-52 Owl
- Fieseler Fi 156 Storch
- Henschel Hs 126
- Kokusai Ki-76
- Repülőgépgyár Levente II (ones used in army co-operation and liaison tasks)
- Westland Lysander

Related lists

- List of aircraft of World War II
