= Coffman engine starter =

Piston engine starting system

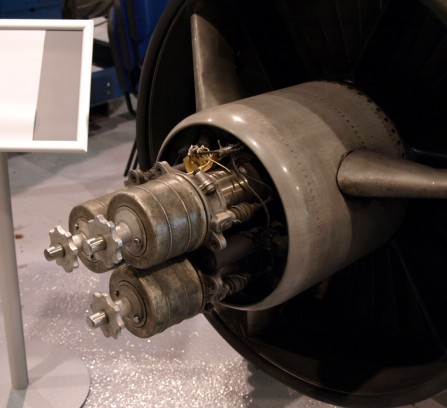
Triple cartridge starter fitted to a Rolls-Royce Avon turbojet engine

The Coffman engine starter (also known as a "shotgun starter") was a starting system used on many piston engines in aircraft and armored vehicles of the 1930s and 1940s. It used a cordite cartridge to move a piston, which cranked the engine. The Coffman system was one of the most common brands; another was the Breeze cartridge system, which was produced under Coffman patents. Most American military aircraft and tanks which used radial engines were equipped with this system. Some versions of the Rolls-Royce Merlin engine used in the British Supermarine Spitfire used the Coffman system as a starter. The Hawker Typhoon and Hawker Tempest also used the Coffman system to start their Napier Sabre engines.

Cartridge starters used on a number of jet engines, including such engines as the Rolls-Royce Avon, which were used in the English Electric Canberra and Hawker Hunter aircraft, used a high gas volume cartridge driving a turbine instead of a piston.

Some Snowcat and similar vehicles used in extreme low temperatures were historically equipped with cartridge start.

== Design ==
The Coffman device used a large blank cartridge containing cordite that, when fired, pushed a piston forward. A screw thread driven by the piston engaged with the engine, turning it over. This was in contrast with other type of cartridge starter which acted directly to drive the engine piston down and so turn the rest of the engine over, such as those used on the Field-Marshall agricultural diesel tractor.

The other systems used during the period were electric motors (such as those used in automobiles today), inertia starter (cranked either by hand or an electric motor) and compressed-air starters, which operated much like Coffman starters but were powered by pressurized air tanks.

Shotgun starters are composed of a breech, into which the cartridge is inserted, which is connected to the motor by a short steel pipe, which acts like a gun barrel. The blank cartridge fits into the breech, and is triggered either electrically or mechanically. When the aircraft's ignition is turned on and the cartridge is fired, high-velocity, high-pressure gas (~1,000 psi (6.9 MPa) at ~600 ft/s (180 m/s)) shoots down the pipe, forcing the motor to spin and engage the starter ring gear on the engine, which is attached to the crankshaft.

Shotgun starters had several advantages over other starting systems in use at the time. Electric starters required large, heavy, and often troublesome batteries to be carried on board, or external charging equipment had to be located at every place where the vehicle was anticipated to operate. Inertia starters used a heavy wheel, usually made of brass, which was spun by a hand crank or electric motor, causing the spinning wheel to engage the starter ring gear. The Coffman system was more lightweight and compact than inertial starters or internal batteries, and it did not require any special auxiliary equipment, an important feature when operating in remote areas.

The primary disadvantages of the shotgun starter are the need to keep a stock of cartridges, one of which is used for each attempt to start, and the short time that the motor is spun by each cartridge. Compressed-air starters, which use the same type of motor, are usually recharged by an engine-driven compressor, negating the need to carry cartridges, but adding requirements for the compressor and air tank. Hybrid systems can be made simply by adding a cartridge breech or an air tank to an existing system. Air tanks can also be recharged from an external source in an emergency, such as a hand pump or a portable air compressor.

The Coffman starter was the most common brand of cartridge starters during the mid-1930s, and the name was used as a generic description. Advances in electrical technology have made shotgun starters obsolete for most uses.

== See also ==
- Aircraft engine starting
- Air-start system
- Isopropyl nitrate - A monopropellant fuel used to power AVPIN turbojet starter motors.
- Components of jet engines
- Flame holder
