= Elleston Trevor =

British novelist and playwright (1920–1995)

- The author in 1970
- Born: 17 February 1920; Bromley, Kent, United Kingdom
- Died: 21 July 1995 (aged 75); Arizona, US
- Occupations: British novelist and playwright - creator of Quiller
- Years active: 1943–1995

Elleston Trevor (17 February 1920 – 21 July 1995) was a British novelist and playwright who wrote under several pseudonyms. Born Trevor Dudley-Smith, he eventually changed his name to Elleston Trevor. Trevor worked in many genres, but is principally remembered for his 1964 adventure story The Flight of the Phoenix, written as Elleston Trevor, and for a series of Cold War thrillers featuring the British secret agent Quiller, written under the pseudonym Adam Hall.

In all, Trevor wrote over 100 books. He also wrote as Simon Rattray, Howard North, Roger Fitzalan, Mansell Black, Trevor Burgess, Warwick Scott, Caesar Smith and Lesley Stone.

== Life and work ==
=== Early life ===
Trevor was born (as Trevor Dudley-Smith) to an alcoholic stockbroker and his (also alcoholic) wife. He hated his prep school, Yardley Court, where he was beaten weekly for doing badly at Latin, and subsequently also disliked Sevenoaks School. He did not attend university, having been apprenticed as a racing driver and then recruited by the Royal Air Force as a Flight Engineer for the duration of the Second World War. He also wrote prolifically, having several story-books for children published while still serving in the air force.

In the 1950s, he was a bestselling author of military adventure stories, published mainly, at that stage, by Heinemann. His spy writing started in the early 1960s and he was often described in the blurb to his paperbacks as "Adam Hall, the mystery author of international bestsellerdom".

=== Private life ===
Born in Bromley (Kent), he lived after the Second World War in Roedean, near Brighton in Sussex, before moving abroad. He lived in Spain and France for fifteen years before moving in 1973 to the United States, where he lived in Phoenix, Arizona and where he died of cancer, in Cave Creek, in 1995. He was married twice — in 1947 to Jonquil Burgess (died 1986) by whom he had one son, Jean Pierre Trevor, and in 1987 to Chaille Anne Groom. He was proficient in karate. He also enjoyed flying kites and racing miniature cars.

=== Writing ===
The Quiller series focuses on a solitary, highly capable "shadow executive" (named after Sir Arthur Quiller-Couch) who works (generally alone) for a British agency in Whitehall called "the Bureau". Officially the organisation doesn't exist, which allows a greater latitude to the sometimes-questionable and always hazardous operations it conducts. He narrates his own adventures. Quiller (not his real name) occupies a literary middle ground between James Bond and John le Carré. He is a skilled driver, pilot, diver, martial artist, and linguist, but he does not carry a gun. Regarded by his superiors as "reliable under torture", Quiller is sometimes captured, then interrogated or tortured without giving away vital information.

The series is very stylised, featuring intense depictions of spy tradecraft (especially "shadowing," the techniques of tailing and evading surveillance) and professional relationships, surprising jump cuts between chapters, and deep, self-critical, incisive, practically stream-of-consciousness, interior monologues highlighting Quiller's mental self-discipline. Most of the novels feature a high-speed car chase, with Quiller as pursuer or pursued, and an extended, detailed scene of hand-to-hand combat.

The first of the Quiller novels, The Berlin Memorandum (1965) (retitled The Quiller Memorandum in the US) won an Edgar Award, from the Mystery Writers of America, for Best Novel. It was filmed in 1966 under its US title with a screenplay by Harold Pinter and starred George Segal, Max von Sydow, and Alec Guinness. It was also adapted into a 1975 British television series, featuring Michael Jayston.

As "Simon Rattray," he wrote mystery novels featuring Hugo Bishop, a brilliant man who, like Agatha Christie's Hercule Poirot, solved crimes as a kind of mental challenge. The first Bishop novel, Knight Sinister, appeared in 1951; five more followed, the last appearing in 1957. (These have later been republished under the Adam Hall byline.) That Trevor could also be very effective in the straight, non-mystery genre is shown by The Billboard Madonna (1961): the protagonist accidentally kills a beautiful woman in a car crash, and is obsessively compelled to memorialise her.

Under the name "Adam Hall," he also wrote The Volcanoes of San Domingo about a mysterious plane crash off the coast of San Domingo and the efforts to uncover what really happened. When alerted by a report indicating that one of the crew members had been seen alive, "Rayner," an employee of the airline, is sent to investigate.

He also wrote children's books about the character "Wumpus", a koala, and his friends, including Flip Flap, the penguin. Titles included Wumpus (published 1945, by Gerald G. Swan), and More about Wumpus (published 1947). Other children's books include Scamper-Foot the Pine Marten, Ripple-Swim the Otter, and the Woodlander series (Deep Wood, Green Glade, Sweethallow Valley, Badger's Moon, Badger's Beech, Badger's Wood, Mole's Castle and Panic in the Woodland).

His book The Big Pick-Up was one of the stories on which the 1958 film Dunkirk was based.

Trevor also wrote radio plays for the BBC.

== Reception ==
Some of the critical acclaim for the Quiller series: "Tense, intelligent, harsh, surprising" (The New York Times)..."A model of breathless entertainment" (The New Yorker)..."Stunningly well done, tense, elliptical, without a misplaced word" (The New Republic)..."You can't go wrong with Quiller" (Harper's).

== Works ==
=== Novels ===
==== As by Elleston Trevor ====
- The Immortal Error (1946)
- Chorus of Echoes (1950)
- Redfern's Miracle (1951)
- Tiger Street (1951)
- A Blaze of Roses (1952); published in the UK as The Fire-Raiser (1970)
- The Passion and the Pity (1953)
- The Big Pick-Up (1955)
- Squadron Airborne (1955)
- The Killing Ground (1956)
- Gale Force (1956)
- The Pillars of Midnight (1957); reissued in the UK as 80,000 Suspects
- Dream of Death (1958)
- Runaway Man (1958)
- Silhouette (1959)
- The V.I.P. (1959)
- The Billboard Madonna (1960)
- The Mind of Max Duvine (1960)
- The Burning Shore (1961); published in the US as The Pasang Run (1962)
- The Flight of the Phoenix (1964)
- The Second Chance (1965)
- Weave a Rope of Sand (1965)
- The Shoot (1966)
- The Freebooters (1967)
- A Place for the Wicked (1968)
- Bury Him Among Kings (1970)
- The Paragon (1975) published in the US as Night Stop
- The Theta Syndrome (1977)
- Blue Jay Summer (1977)
- Seven Witnesses (1977)
- The Damocles Sword (1981)
- The Penthouse (1983)
- Deathwatch (1984)
- The Sister (1994)
- Flycatcher (1994)
- Welcome to South Park (1995)

==== As by Adam Hall ====
- The Volcanoes of San Domingo (1963)
- Quiller series:
  1. The Berlin Memorandum (1965); republished as The Quiller Memorandum
  2. The 9th Directive (1966)
  3. The Striker Portfolio (1968)
  4. The Warsaw Document (1971)
  5. The Tango Briefing (1973)
  6. The Mandarin Cypher (1975)
  7. The Kobra Manifesto (1976)
  8. The Sinkiang Executive (1978)
  9. The Scorpion Signal (1979)
  10. The Pekin Target (1981); published in the U.S. as The Peking Target (1982)
  11. Northlight (1985); published in the U.S. as Quiller
  12. Quiller's Run (1988)
  13. Quiller KGB (1989)
  14. Quiller Barracuda (1990)
  15. Quiller Bamboo (1991)
  16. Quiller Solitaire (1992)
  17. Quiller Meridian (1993)
  18. Quiller Salamander (1994)
  19. Quiller Balalaika (1996)
- The Sibling (1979), published in the UK as by Elleston Trevor (1981); later reissued in the U.S. as by Elleston Trevor

==== As by Mansell Black ====
- Dead on Course (1951)
- Sinister Cargo (1951)
- Shadow of Evil (1953)
- Steps in the Dark (1954)

==== As by Trevor Dudley-Smith ====
- Over the Wall (1943)
- Double Who Double Crossed (1944)
- Escape to Fear (1948)
- Now Try the Morgue (1948)

==== As by Roger Fitzalan ====
- A Blaze of Arms (1967); later published in the UK as by Adam Hall

==== As by Howard North ====
- Expressway (1973); reissued in the US and UK in paperback as by Elleston Trevor

==== As by Simon Rattray ====
- Hugo Bishop series:
  1. Knight Sinister (1951); reissued in the UK and US as by Adam Hall
  2. Queen in Danger (1952); reissued in UK and US as by Adam Hall
  3. Bishop in Check (1953); reissued in the UK and US as by Adam Hall
  4. Dead Silence (1954); reissued in the UK and US as by Adam Hall as Pawn in Jeopardy
  5. Dead Circuit (1955); reissued in the UK and US as by Adam Hall as Rook's Gambit
  6. Dead Sequence (1957)

==== As by Warwick Scott ====
- Image in the Dust (1951); US title Cockpit (1953); reissued in the UK as by Elleston Trevor
- The Domesday Story (1952); US title Doomsday (1953); reissued in the UK as by Elleston Trevor
- Naked Canvas (1954); reissued in the UK and US as by Elleston Trevor

==== As by Caesar Smith ====
- Heat Wave (1957); reissued in the UK as by Elleston Trevor

==== As by Lesley Stone ====
- Siren Song (1985); as by Leslie Stone in the US
- Riviera Story (1987)

=== Short stories collections ===
==== As by Elleston Trevor ====
- Elleston Trevor Miscellany (1944)

=== Short stories ===
==== As by Adam Hall ====
- Quiller series:
  - "Last Rites", published in the April 1986 issue of Espionage Magazine

==== As by Elleston Trevor ====
- "The Chicken Switch" published in the April 1965 issue of Science Fantasy; republished in Bonfiglioli, Kyril, ed. (1966). SF Reprise 4. Compact Books.; republished in van Thal, Herbert, ed. (1975). The 16th Pan Book of Horror Stories. Pan Books. pp. 113–119. ISBN 0-330-24544-9.
- "They're Making a Mistake" published in van Thal, Herbert, ed. (1976). The 17th Pan Book of Horror Stories. Pan Books. pp. 81–93. ISBN 0-330-24805-7.

=== Children's books ===
==== As by Elleston Trevor ====
- Animal Life series:
  1. Scamperfoot, the Pine Marten (1943)
  2. Ripple-Swim, the Otter (1944)
  3. Shadow, the Fox (1944)
- Happy Glade/Deep Wood series:
  1. Into the Happy Glade (1943); issued as by Trevor Dudley-Smith
  2. By a Silver Stream (1944); issued as by Trevor Dudley-Smith
  3. Deep Wood (1945)
  4. Heather Hill (1946)
  5. The Secret Travellers (1948)
  6. The Island of the Pines (1948)
  7. Badger's Beech (1948)
  8. The Chipmunks of Willow Wood (1948)
  9. The Wizard of the Wood (1948)
  10. Badger's Moon (1949)
  11. Mole's Castle (1951)
  12. Sweethallow Valley (1951)
  13. Badger's Wood (1958)
  14. Green Glade (1959)
  15. Squirrel's Island (1963)
- Wumpus series:
  1. Wumpus (1945)
  2. More about Wumpus (1947)
  3. Where's Wumpus (1948)
- Ant's Castle (1949)
- Challenge of the Firebrand (1951)
- Secret Arena (1951)
- Forbidden Kingdom (1955)
- The Crystal City (1959)

==== As by Trevor Burgess ====
- A Spy at Monk's Court (1949)
- Mystery of the Missing Book (1950)
- The Racing Wraith (1953)

==== As by Trevor Dudley-Smith ====
- Happy Glade/Deep Wood series:
  1. Into the Happy Glade (1943)
  2. By a Silver Stream (1944)

=== Stage plays ===
==== As by Elleston Trevor ====
- The Last of the Daylight (1959)
- Murder by All Means (1960)
- The Search (no later than 1963)
- A Pinch of Purple (1971)
- A Touch of Purple (1972)
- Just Before Dawn (1972)

=== Radio plays ===
==== As by Elleston Trevor ====
- Knight Sinister (BBC Light Programme, 29 October 1952; adapted from his 1951 novel)
- Full Cry (BBC Home Service, 7 February 1953)
- The Hoxton Statement (BBC Home Service, 20 May 1953)
- Dead Silence (BBC Light Programme, 8 June – 27 July 1953 in eight weekly episodes; adapted from his own story)
- One Green Bottle (BBC Light Programme, 18 October 1953)
- Queen in Danger (BBC Light Programme, 4 November 1953; adapted from his 1952 novel)
- A Blaze of Roses (BBC Light Programme, 17 January 1954; adapted from his 1952 novel)
- The Domesday Story (BBC Light Programme, 21 March 1954; adapted from his 1952 novel)
- The Passion and the Pity (BBC Home Service, 27 March 1954; adapted from his 1953 novel)
- Mister Mysterious (BBC Home Service, 30 October 1954; adapted from his 1951 novel Redfern's Miracle)
- Dead Circuit (BBC Light Programme, 31 May – 19 July 1955 in eight weekly episodes; adapted from his own novel)
- Heatwave (BBC Home Service, 17 November 1955)
- The Cloud (no later than 1962)
- Murder By All Means (BBC Home Service, 1 April 1964; adapted from his 1960 stage play)
- Bury Him Among Kings (BBC Home Service, 4–18 July 1973 in three weekly parts; adapted from his 1970 novel)

=== Unfilmed screenplays ===
==== As by Elleston Trevor ====
- Woman of Straw (1964; uncredited)

=== Nonfiction ===
==== As by Elleston Trevor ====
Journalism:

- Trevor, Elleston (27 June 1982). "Bridge Across the Years". Arizona Magazine.
