= Harat Zuwayyah =

Town in Khufra District

Coordinates: 24°15′13″N 21°57′56″E

Khufra District highlighted on a map.

Harat Zuwayyah (also Ḩārat Zuwayyah) is a town located in south-east Libya's Khufra District, in the Cyrenaica Region. The town spread over 8 square kilometres (3.1 sq mi) is 1 km north of Rabyanah, both residing in the basin of an intermittent oasis on the foothills of a small cluster of mountains, with a zenith of 600m. Harat Zuwayyah is roughly 135 km west of its nearest major road which includes the settlement al-Jawf.

Coordinates: 24°15'N 21°58'E
Country	Libya
Region	Cyrenaica
District	Khufra District
Elevation	306 m (1004 ft)
Time zone	UTC+2 (EET)
Weather	Refer to TWN
