= Rebiana Sand Sea =

Sand desert region in Libya

Rabyanah Sand Sea بحر الرمال ربيانة
- Desert
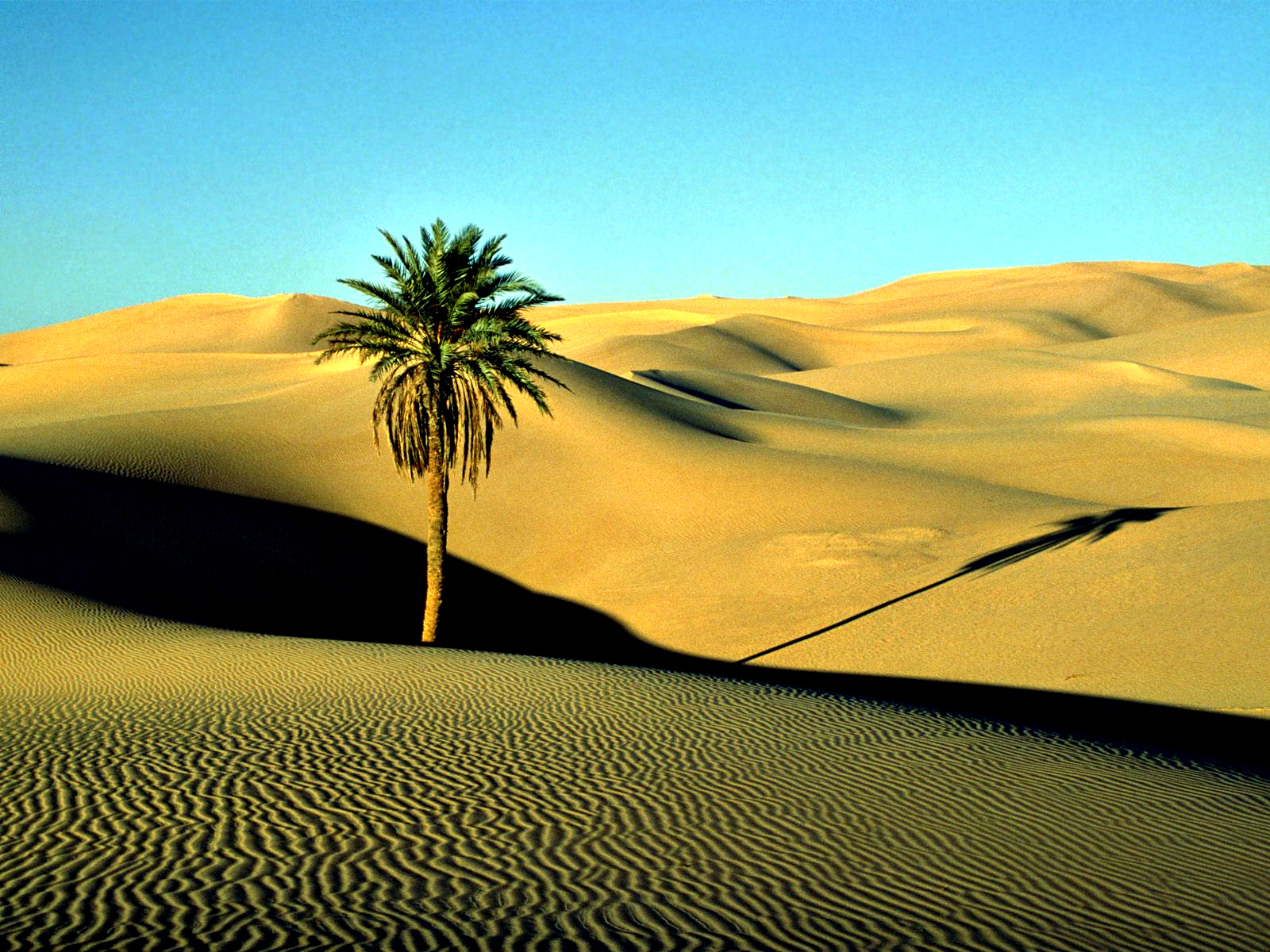
- Phoenix dactylifera Saharan date palm in the Saharan Libyan Desert, Cyrenaica - Southeastern Libya.

- Location within Libya
- Coordinates: 25°0′N 19°0′E
- Location: Libya
- Part of: Libyan Desert, Sahara

Area
  - Total: 65,000 km^{2} (25,000 sq mi)
- Elevation: 360 m (1,180 ft)

The Rabyanah Sand Sea, Rabyanah, is a sand desert region spanning approximately 65,000 km^{2} in southeastern Libya.

== Geography ==
The area of the Rabyanah Sand Sea is in the western part of the Libyan Desert in the Kufra District of the Cyrenaica region. It is named after the oasis town of Rabyanah located towards its eastern end.

Together with the Calanshio Sand Sea and the Great Sand Sea, the Rabyanah Sand Sea is part of the greater Libyan Desert.

== See also ==
- Libyan Desert
  - Calanshio Sand Sea
  - Great Sand Sea
