= Tragedy at Kufra =

1942 aviation incident

Kufra multiple aircraft crew loss
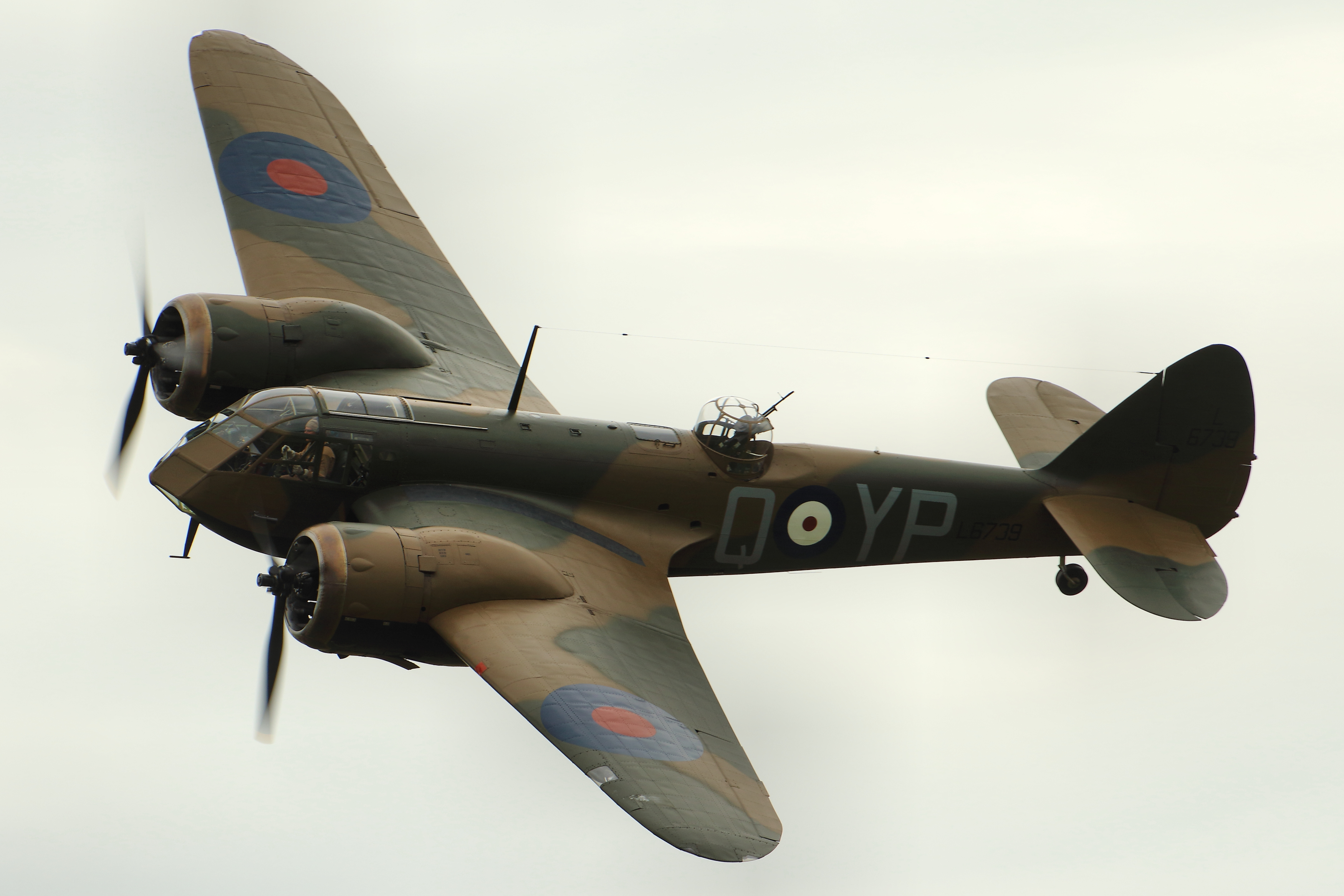
- Blenheim light bomber

incident
- Date: 4 May 1942
- Summary: Navigation error
- Site: NE of Kufra airfield, Libya, North Africa; 24°51′00″N 24°25′00″E

Aircraft
- Aircraft type: 3x Bristol Blenheim Mark IV
- Flight origin: Desert airfield Kufra on four legged circuit back to point of origin
- Destination: 15 Sqn SAAF airfield at Kufra
- Crew: 12 (3 crews of 4 each)
- Fatalities: 11
- Survivors: 1

The Tragedy at Kufra occurred in May 1942 during World War II, when 11 of 12 South African aircrew flying in three Bristol Blenheim Mark IV aircraft of No. 15 Squadron of the South African Air Force died of thirst and exposure, after the flight became lost following a navigational error near the oasis of Kufra in Libya and made a forced landing in the Libyan Desert.

== The deployment to Kufra ==
The South African Air Force's 15 Squadron, equipped with Bristol Blenheim Mark IV aircraft, departed South Africa in January 1942 for service in Egypt in support of Allied forces in the North African campaign of World War II. Arriving in Egypt in February 1942, it set up operations south of Amreya, near Alexandria. Only two men in the squadron – its commanding officer, Lieutenant Colonel H. H. Borckenhagen and Captain J. L. V. de Wet – had experience in desert operations.

The squadron was ordered to dispatch a detachment of aircraft to the oasis at Kufra, deep in the Libyan Desert in southeastern Libya, where they were to support Allied ground forces garrisoning Kufra with aerial reconnaissance, air defence and support to the Long Range Desert Group operating behind German lines in southern Libya. On 8 April 1942, 47 ground staff departed for Kufra, making a journey by train, river steamer, and ground vehicle; they arrived on 25 April. The newly promoted Major de Wet, who was placed in command of the detachment, meanwhile flew to Kufra on 11 April to make final arrangements for the detachment's arrival.

15 Squadron selected its three best Blenheims (Z7513, Z7610, and T2252) for the detachment. Each carrying a three-man crew, they arrived at Kufra on 28 April 1942, flying from Amariya via Wadi Halfa to avoid passing over enemy-held territory. Upon arrival, they found that the direction-finding station at Kufra was not functioning properly. Back in Amariya, Lieutenant Colonel Borckenhagen, who had no direct communications with Kufra, asked Royal Air Force Headquarters in the region to pass orders to de Wet on his behalf to keep the detachment grounded until the direction-finding station was made fully operational.

== The flight ==
By 3 May 1942 the direction-finding station was back in working order and Major de Wet briefed his crews on their first familiarisation flight which he would lead early the following morning. The flight was to be made at a true air speed of 150 mph (240 km/h) and was to familiarise crews with landmarks in the area and to gain experience with desert flying. Takeoff was planned for early morning 4 May and was to follow roughly a square path, with its first leg one of 83 miles (134 km) from Kufra to Rebiana, Libya, on a course of 269°, followed by a second leg of 51.5 miles (82.9 km) on bearing 358° to Bzema, then a third leg of 64 miles (103 km) on bearing 63° to Landing Ground 007 (LG-007 Matruh West), and finally on bearing 162° for the 83.5-mile (134-km) leg back to Kufra, with ETA at Kufra planned for 07:42. In addition to the crew of three in each aircraft, each plane would carry an armourer to assist with armament aboard the aircraft during the flight. Each aircraft carried four days of rations plus water.

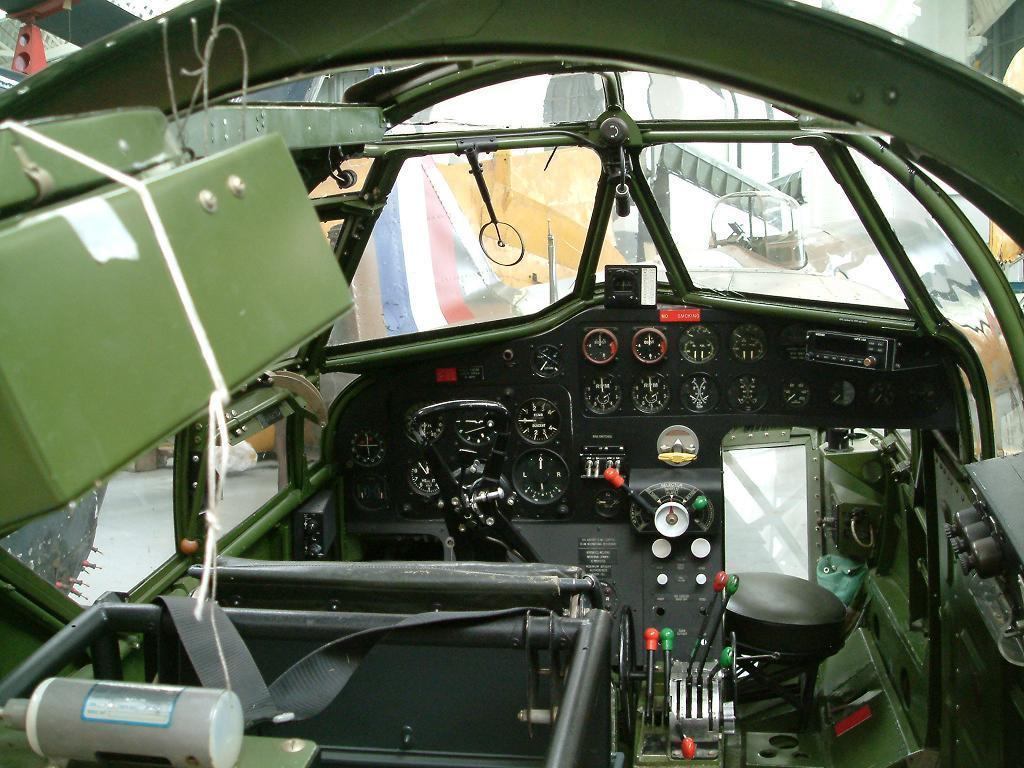
The cockpit of a Bristol Blenheim Mark IV on display at the Imperial War Museum Duxford in August 2005.

After receiving the early-morning weather report for the region which predicted a visibility of 2.5 miles (4.0 km) and wind from a bearing of 60° at a speed of 19 to 24 mph (31 to 39 km/h) at 1,600 feet (490 m), de Wet refused a weather balloon check of wind conditions – this was to prove fatal. The three Blenheims, each with four men aboard, took off from Kufra and after initial communications checks nothing was heard from the aircraft until 7:10. In the meantime, the three Blenheim crews believed that they had successfully completed their flight, identifying each waypoint and planning to arrive at Kufra between 07:33 and 07:42. However, Allied personnel at Rebiana did not hear them fly past, suggesting that they already were off course by the time they thought they had completed the first leg of their flight. A contributing factor may have been that a weather balloon launched shortly after they took off revealed that the earlier weather report was wrong, and that winds at 2,200 feet (670 m) actually were blowing at 31 mph (50 km/h) from a bearing of 290°, and one of the navigators aboard the planes noted that the flight was so bumpy that he was unable to take drift readings.

At 07:10, Kufra finally heard from the Blenheims, when aircraft Z7610 requested a bearing and Kufra requested that it transmit dashes so that the direction-finding station could establish its bearing; the aircraft did not respond. At 07:27, Major de Wet's Blenheim, Z7513, requested a course for a return to Kufra, but its radio operator ceased broadcasting before the direction-finding station could determine its bearing; after taking a snap bearing, Kufra radioed 120-3=0527, meaning that the aircraft should "steer 120° (zero wind) third-class fix, time 05h27 GMT," but the aircraft appears only to have heard the numbers 3-0-5 and as a result believed the course to base was 305°. The aircraft turned to this course at 07:42, and Allied infantrymen at Taizerbo heard them fly past to the west. At 08:10 they turned 180° to fly on the reciprocal bearing, 125°. After T2252's starboard engine began to malfunction around 09:00 hours, Major de Wet ordered the aircraft to land in the desert, which all three Blenheims did successfully at 09:15.

== The search ==
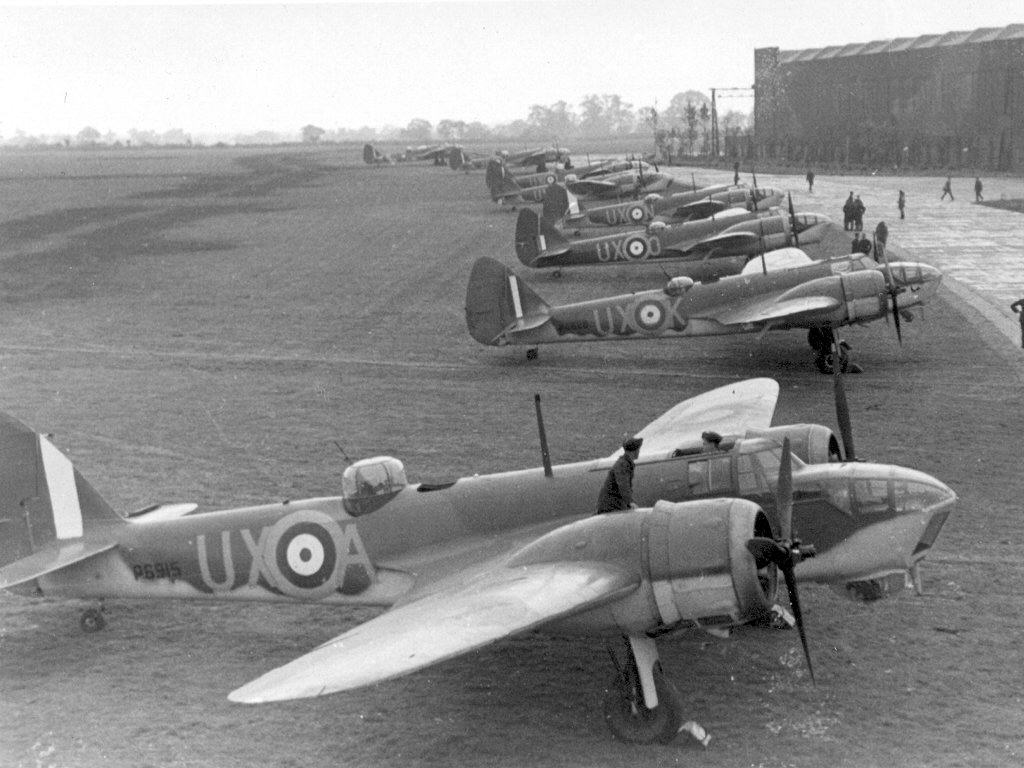
A line-up of Bristol Blenheim Mark IVs, the same of type of aircraft forced down in the Kufra incident.

=== 4 May ===
The Blenheim crews conferred and erroneously concluded that they were only about 20 miles (32 km) from Kufra. At 11:00, a crew took off in Z7610 and flew southwest, but returned at 11:30 having failed to find Kufra. After transferring fuel from the disabled T2252, a crew again took off in Z7610 and flew on a heading of 213° for about 24 miles (39 km), but returned at 11:40 without having sighted Kufra. A third flight left at 15:35 and flew on a course of 240° – which would have led it to Kufra – but turned back after 81 miles (130 km) before reaching Kufra. The crews made no further attempts to find their base that day and apparently assuming imminent rescue they consumed a great deal of water during their first day in the desert.

By midday on 4 May, Kufra was aware that the three Blenheims must have landed somewhere in the desert. Occasional weak signals from the aircraft during the day were inadequate to establish their bearing. Ground search parties were organised at Rebiana, Bzema, and LG07 and various direction-finding stations monitored possible signals from the missing aircraft. Ground searches began based on doubtful bearings taken during the day.

=== 5 May ===
The downed Blenheim crews made two more unsuccessful flights seeking Kufra on 5 May. Flying Z7513 using fuel transferred from T2252, one crew flew on a bearing of 90° for about 45 miles (72 km); after its return, it departed again on a flight of 96 miles (154 km) on a bearing of 290° with three men aboard, but was forced down by fuel exhaustion 24 miles (39 km) north of the other two stranded Blenheims. Evidence discovered when searchers found Z7513 four days later suggested that its crew had landed twice during this flight, but were unable to rejoin the other Blenheims due to lack of fuel. Meanwhile, most of the various ground search parties returned to report their lack of success, and the requirement for an air search became obvious. With Z7513 not returning, the remaining survivors assumed that the aircraft had reached Kufra and that rescue was imminent.

=== 6 May ===
The nine men stranded with Z7610 and T2252 had used up almost all of their water by the morning of 6 May. Major de Wet himself took off in Z7610 to search on a bearing of 290°, but returned without success. Meanwhile, three Bristol Bombays of the Royal Air Force's No. 216 Squadron began an air search, but encountered a sandstorm that grounded them for the next two days. The sandstorm aggravated the plight of the men with the stranded Blenheims; those with Z7610 and T2252 began to die during the afternoon.

=== 7–11 May ===
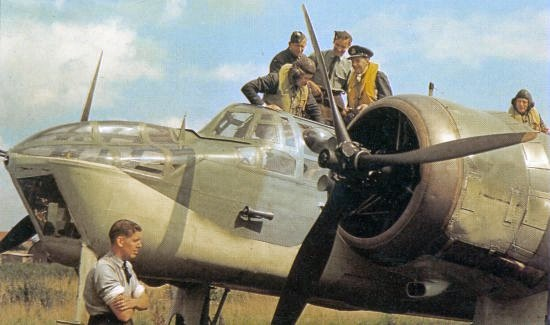
A Royal Air Force Bristol Blenheim Mark IV similar to those involved in the Kufra incident being serviced in the Middle East ca. 1942.

The sandstorm continued through 7 May and into 8 May, when visibility finally began to improve. Major de Wet recorded on 8 May that only six men remained alive out of the 12, and expressed concern that the men might shoot one another or him; later in the day he observed that only two men were left alive besides him. At various times between 5 and 9 May, ground search parties came to within 2 miles (3.2 km) of Z7513 and T2252 and within 5 miles (8.0 km) of Z7513, but limited visibility prevented them from finding the stranded Blenheims.

On 9 May, with the sandstorm finally over, a Vickers Wellington sighted Z7513 and landed alongside it. Its crew found the Blenheim's three-man crew lying in the shade of its wing, all apparently dead since 8 May.

On 11 May, the same Wellington found Z7610 and T2252 parked nose-to-nose at either 24°51′00″N 24°25′00″E or 24°49′00″N 24°10′00″E. (Note: The Coetzee narrative cites both positions without explanation for the apparent contradiction.) Once landed, the Wellington crew found A/Mech Juul as the sole survivor. The bodies of Major de Wet and seven of his men were found around the aircraft, some with what were assumed to have been self-inflicted gunshot wounds. Three revolvers were found with all ammunition expended. One of the revolvers was found in the hand of Major de Wet. Juul was flown to Kufra for medical attention and later testified at the SAAF/RAF Court of Enquiry.

== Aftermath ==
=== Inquiry ===
An inquiry into the incident took place at Kufra from 1 to 4 June 1942. The board of inquiry attributed the incident to the crews' lack of experience in desert flying; their failure to keep accurate navigator's logs; and the failure of wireless operators to perform their duties during the flight. The board placed the responsibility for the forced landing on the crew of the leading aircraft, Z7610 flown by Major de Wet. The board attributed the failure of the ground and air searches to a lack of accurate information regarding the possible position of the aircraft; the difficult terrain; the sandstorm; problems with unserviceable aircraft that could not carry out search functions assigned to them and poor signal organisation. It also found that the downed Blenheim crews did little to assist the searchers in finding them because the crews engaged in bad direction-finding procedures even after landing and failed to employ visual signals and smudge fires.

The inquiry also identified reasons for the early death of the stranded aviators, finding that they failed to appreciate their plight or to ration water immediately and that they made foolish use of compass alcohol, A/Mech van Breda having drunk it despite its poisonous qualities, and fire extinguishers, which they had sprayed on themselves for temporary relief from the heat resulting in the infliction of painful skin injuries and their ignorance of survival techniques.

To avoid any recurrence of the Kufra incident, the board made comprehensive recommendations with regard to equipment to be carried on aircraft likely to fly over the desert and emergency procedures in the event of forced landings in the desert. It also recommended that only experienced crews operate from Kufra. By a strange stroke of irony, Major de Wet had been dubbed "Jannie sonder koers" (Off-Course Jannie) in Abyssinia following an incident when he led his flight of Fairey Battles in the wrong direction due to instrument damage and disorientation.

=== Bodies ===
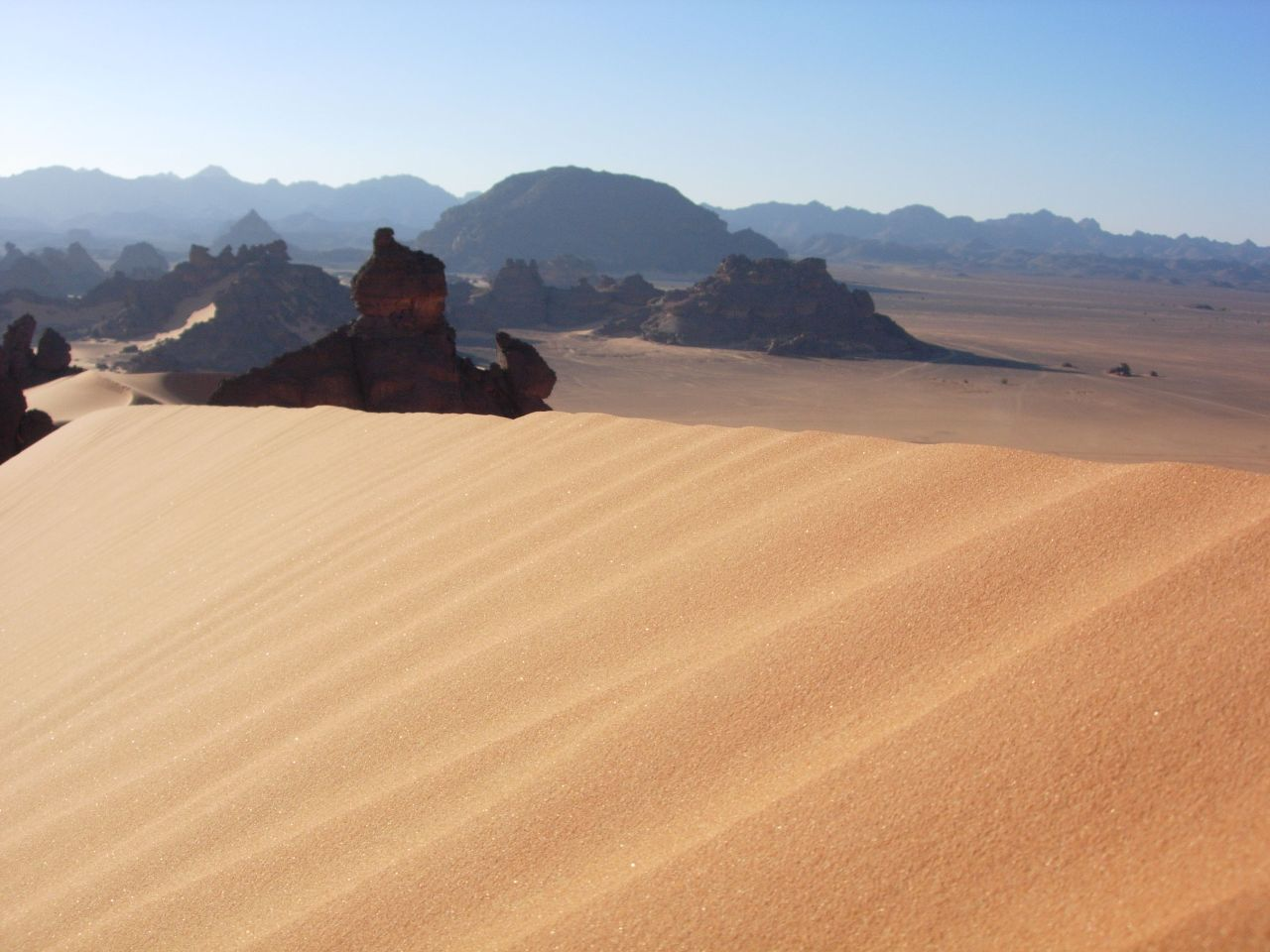
The Libyan Desert landscape in southern Libya.

The search parties buried the three men found with Z7513 (Note: Z7513 Crew consisting of: 205553 2/Lt. Johannes Hendrik Pienaar; 102448 2/Lt. Francis John Reid and, 207954 Air/Sgt. Wallace William Olivier) next to the plane, and the eight men found dead around Z7610 (Note: Z7610 Crew included: 102660 Maj. Johan Louis Venter De Wet, 94293 2/Lt. Jacobus Stephanus Du Toit, 206367 Air/Sgt. Andries Pieter Vos and; 207954 A/Mech Charles Frederick van Breda; 58738 A/Mech Rudolph Johannes Swanepoel from Z7513.) and T2252 (Note: T2252 Crew were: 104019 2/Lt. Louis Theodorus Wessels, 102078 2/Lt. Hope Pienaar, 99328V Air/Sgt. Sidney Egbert Shipman and; A/Mech Noel St Malo Juul. Juul was the sole survivor who later testified at the SAAF/RAF Court of Enquiry).) at their discovery site.

In February 1959, a geological survey party rediscovered Z7513, and the bodies of its three crewmen were exhumed and reburied in Knightsbridge War Cemetery at Acroma, Libya. The bodies of the eight men found with Z7610 and T2252 remained where they had been buried until 1963 when they were exhumed and reinterred in Knightsbridge.

=== Aircraft recovery ===
In May 1942, Z7610 and T2252 were repaired and flown back to Kufra. T2252 later suffered engine failure and crashed near Kufra, but Z7610 operated with No. 15 Squadron's detachment there until 27 November 1942, when the detachment departed Kufra to return to the squadron. By that time, the squadron had converted to Bristol Bisleys – the Mark V ground-attack variant of the Blenheim – so the detachment left Z7610 behind at Kufra to be repaired by a Royal Air Force Maintenance Unit (MU) and flown to Khartoum in the Sudan. Z7513's engines had been run with excessive manifold pressure and, as it was considered un-flyable, it was abandoned where it lay. After an Axis air raid on Kufra on 25 September 1942, it was cannibalised for spare parts to repair a Bisley damaged in the raid.

== See also ==
- Lady Be Good, a World War II B-24 bomber also lost, with her entire crew, in the Libyan Desert
- List of North African airfields during World War II
