= Jouf =

Jouf may refer to:

- Osaka Broadcasting Corporation’s radio station at Osaka, Japan, callsign JOUF
- Al Jawf (disambiguation), the name of several places
