= Wadi Zighen =

Saharan oasis in Libya

Coordinates: 25°26′29″N 22°10′55″E

Wadi Zighen (also Wadi Zighan) is a depression (height 310 metres) located in the Libyan Desert in the Kufra District of Libya, about 180 km north-northwest of El Tag and east of Tazirbu. There are five wells in Wadi Zighen, the most important is named Bir el Hárasc. Around the wells grow some palms, but there are no permanent inhabitants.

== Sources ==
- Bertarelli, L.V. (1929). Guida d'Italia, Vol. XVII (in Italian). Milano: Consociazione Turistica Italiana.
