= Calanshio Sand Sea =

Desert region in eastern Libya

The Calanscio Sand Sea (Sarīr Kalanshiyū ar Ramlī al Kabīr) is an erg located in the Libyan Desert, in Cyrenaica's Kufra District, eastern Libya. It has a surface of approximately 62,000 km². The erg, an area of actively shifting dunes, extends from Jaghbub and Jalo in the north to Kufra in the south, a distance of 500km.

The erg lies parallel to the Great Sand Sea and is contiguous with it at their northern ends. They contain dunes up to 110m in height: these lie in a roughly north-south direction and were created by the wind.

The Calanscio Sand Sea is the site of the missing World War II B-24 Liberator Lady Be Good. The wreck was discovered 200 km (120 mi) north of Kufra 15 years after it was reported missing in 1943. The crew bailed out believing they were over the sea, when their plane ran out of fuel, and they became lost. When they landed in the Libyan Desert they could feel a northwesterly breeze. Thinking they were near the Mediterranean Sea, they headed into the wind hoping it would lead them to safety. However, they were more than 640 km inland from the Mediterranean, and slowly died from dehydration after covering 130 km with minimal water in a place so dry even the desert Bedouins refused to enter.

== See also ==
- Libyan Desert
  - Ribiana Sand Sea
  - Idehan Murzuq
  - Idehan Ubari
- Calansho Desert
