= King Nine Will Not Return =

- The Twilight Zone episode
- Episode no.: Season 2 Episode 1
- Directed by: Buzz Kulik
- Written by: Rod Serling
- Production code: 173-3639
- Original air date: September 30, 1960

Guest appearances
- Bob Cummings as Captain James Embry; Gene Lyons as Psychiatrist; Paul Lambert as Doctor; Jenna McMahon as Nurse

Episode chronology
← Previous "A World of His Own"	Next → "The Man in the Bottle"
- The Twilight Zone (1959 TV series, season 2)

"King Nine Will Not Return" is the season two premiere episode, and 37th overall, of the American television anthology series The Twilight Zone. It originally aired on September 30, 1960 on CBS.

This was the first episode where Rod Serling appeared on camera at the beginning, rather than introducing the episode in a voice-over narration.

== Opening narration ==
This is Africa, 1943. War spits out its violence overhead, and the sandy graveyard swallows it up. Her name is King Nine, B-25, medium bomber, Twelfth Air Force. On a hot, still morning, she took off from Tunisia to bomb the southern tip of Italy. An errant piece of flak tore a hole in the wing tank and, like a wounded bird, this is where she landed, not to return on this day, or any other day.

== Plot ==
During World War II, the B-25 Mitchell bomber King Nine has crashed in the desert. Captain James Embry finds himself stranded among the wreckage, with his crew mysteriously disappeared. The movement of the plane in the wind and his visions of the missing men serve to heighten Embry's disorientation.

While searching for his crew, Embry finds the grave of one of his men, and recognizes in the sky Navy F9F Cougar jets, which have not yet been invented. He is bewildered as to how he knows about jet aircraft and becomes increasingly distressed. Embry collapses in the sand, and it is revealed that he is apparently hospitalized and suffering hallucinations, 17 years after the crash.

Confident that Embry will recover, two doctors discuss their speculation that his suffering has been triggered by a newspaper headline. The paper has reported the desert discovery of the long-lost King Nine, which had not returned to base from a wartime mission in 1943. Having come down with a fever just before he was to board the ill-fated flight, Embry had been replaced on the mission by another captain. Seeing the headline has triggered survivor guilt, the intensity of which has caused him to imagine himself at the crash site.

The doctors assure Embry he has returned to the site only in his mind. However, when a nurse handling his clothes accidentally turns one of his shoes on its side, sand spills out.

== Closing narration ==
Enigma buried in the sand, a question mark with broken wings that lies in silent grace as a marker in a desert shrine. Odd how the real consorts with the shadows, how the present fuses with the past. How does it happen? The question is on file in the silent desert, and the answer? The answer is waiting for us in - The Twilight Zone.

== Cast ==
- Bob Cummings as Captain James Embry
- Gene Lyons as Psychiatrist
- Paul Lambert as Doctor
- Jenna McMahon as Nurse

== Production notes ==
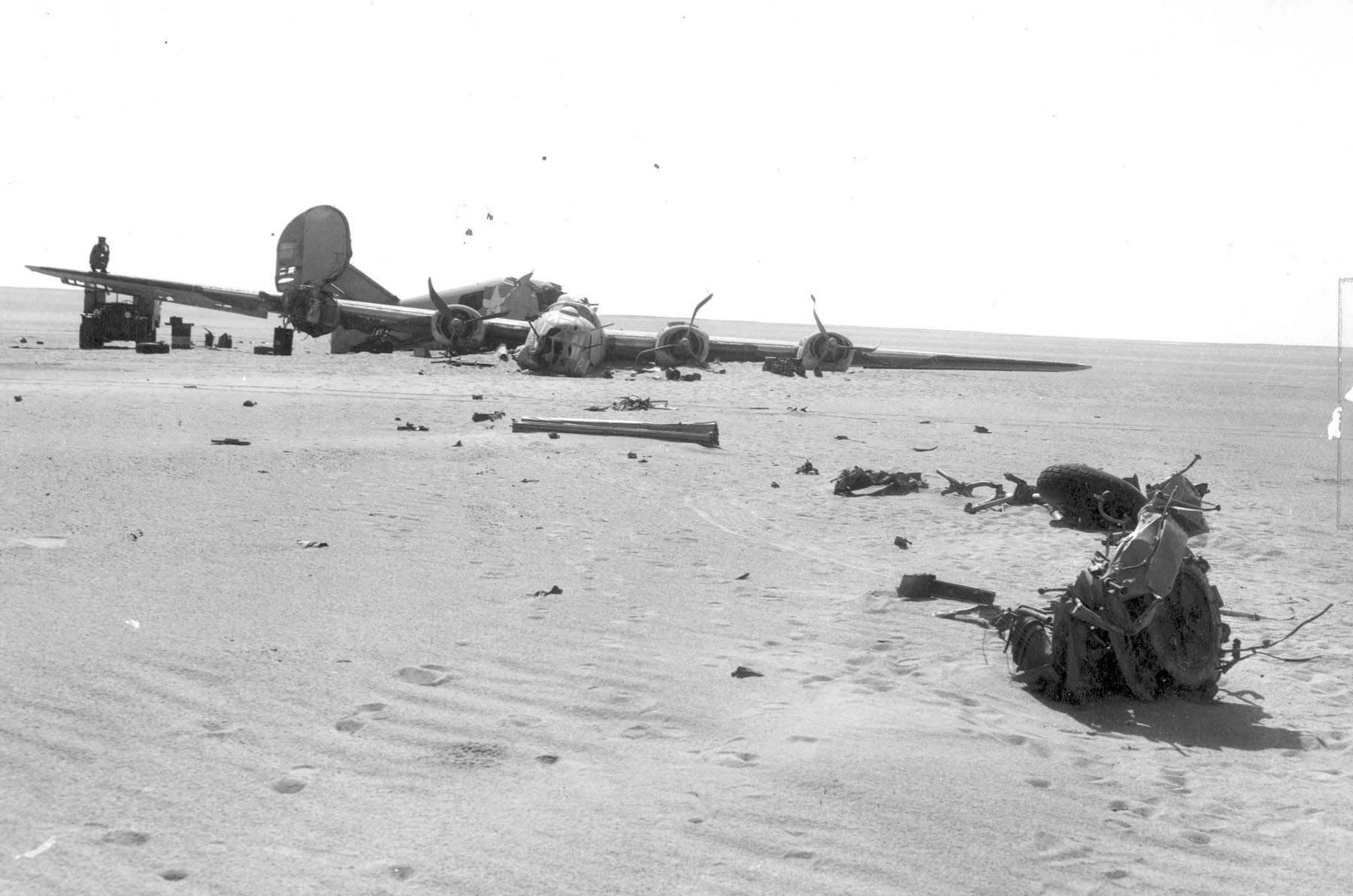
Wreckage of the Lady Be Good

This was the first episode to feature the familiar Marius Constant Twilight Zone theme. The score by Fred Steiner was later used in other Twilight Zone episodes.

The episode was based on the discovery of the B-24 Liberator bomber Lady Be Good and her crew's remains; the plane had crash-landed at night, deep in the Libyan desert after running out of fuel, while returning from a World War II bombing mission over Naples, Italy. In the episode, the marker of a grave of a member of the crew of King Nine is dated "5 April 1943," the day on which the Lady Be Good was lost. Lady Be Good had been found in 1958, and the bodies of eight of the nine-man crew were discovered between February and August 1960 – the eighth crewman being found just a few weeks before "King Nine Will Not Return" aired.

The bomber aircraft used in this episode was a North American Aviation B-25C-10NA 42-32354, which still exists in storage with Aero Trader, Borrego Springs, California.

Cummings played a number of pilots during his career.

== Short story adaptation ==
"King Nine Will Not Return" was adapted into short story form by Walter B. Gibson in the 1963 collection Rod Serling's Twilight Zone as "Return From Oblivion". Despite the different title, it follows the plot of the television version precisely, with no significant changes.

== See also ==
- Lady Be Good (aircraft)
- List of The Twilight Zone (1959 TV series) episodes
- Sole Survivor (1970)
