= Gene Lyons (actor) =

American actor (1921–1974)

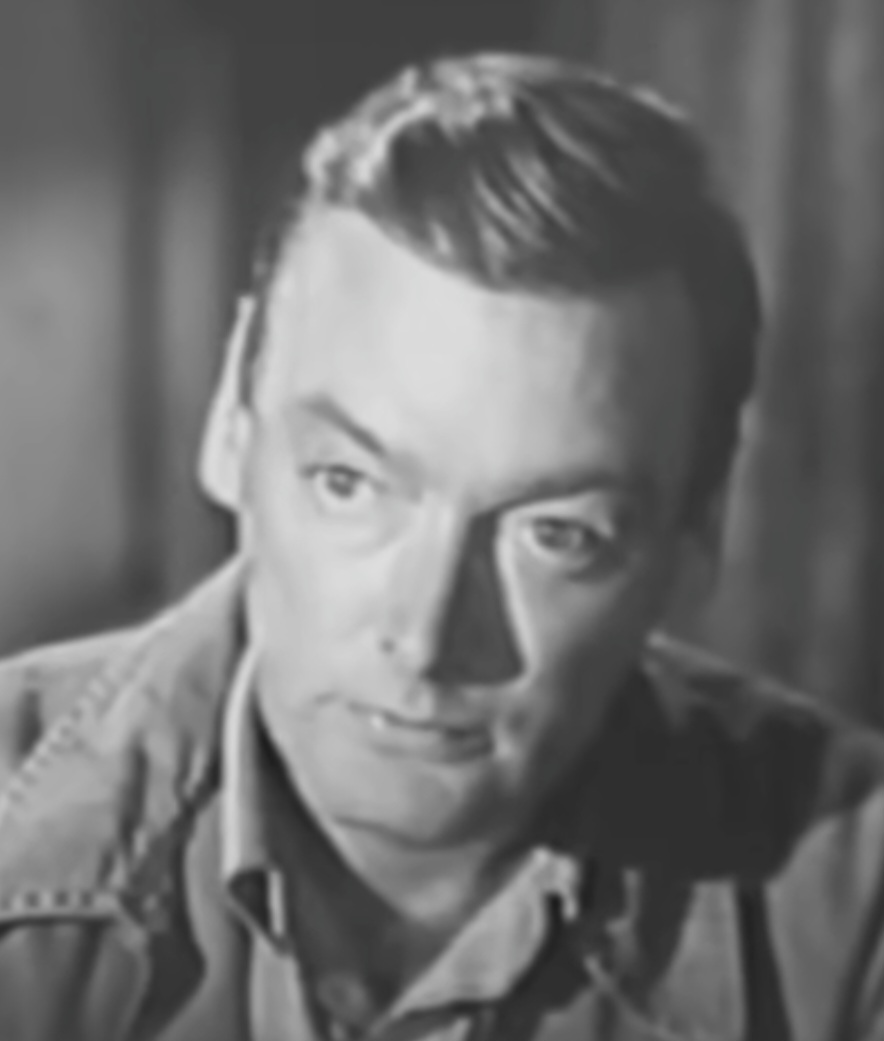
- Lyons in an episode of One Step Beyond (1960)
- Born: Matthew Eugene Lyons; February 9, 1921; Pittsburgh, Pennsylvania, U.S.
- Died: July 8, 1974 (aged 53); Hollywood, California, U.S.
- Resting place: Calvary Catholic Cemetery (Pittsburgh), U.S.
- Occupation: Actor
- Years active: 1943–1974

Gene Lyons (February 9, 1921 – July 8, 1974) was an American television actor perhaps best known for his role as police commissioner Dennis Randall on the NBC detective series Ironside.

== Career ==
Born in Pittsburgh, Lyons was a life member of The Actors Studio. His first of seven Broadway appearances was in February 1943, in a short-lived production of Walter Livingston Faust's This Rock, produced by Eddie Dowling. He co-starred in the Broadway production of Witness for the Prosecution for two years (1954–56). His other Broadway credits are Harriet (1943–44), Death of a Salesman (1949–50), An Enemy of the People (1950–51), The Trip to Bountiful (1953) and Masquerade (1958).

In 1953, Lyons played a police detective on the CBS drama series Pentagon Confidential (renamed Pentagon U.S.A. by second episode). He appeared in 1954 as Steve Rockwell on the CBS daytime drama Woman with a Past. In 1963 Lyons appeared as Sheriff Jonathan Ballard on the TV western The Virginian in the episode titled "If You Have Tears".

Before joining Raymond Burr as a regular on Ironside (1967–74), he appeared on Burr's Perry Mason, in the 1965 episode "The Case of the Wrathful Wraith". He also made guest appearances on nearly two dozen other series including The Dick Van Dyke Show, Gunsmoke (“Bently”), Have Gun – Will Travel, The Fugitive, Ben Casey, Star Trek ("A Taste of Armageddon"), The Twilight Zone ("King Nine Will Not Return"), The Alfred Hitchcock Hour, Bonanza ("Shining in Spain") and The Untouchables. He also appeared in films including The Young Don't Cry and Kiss Her Goodbye.

== Death ==
Lyons was 53 years old when he died in Los Angeles from complications related to chronic alcoholism, and is buried at Calvary Catholic Cemetery in Pittsburgh.

== Filmography ==
| Year | Title | Role | Notes |
|---|---|---|---|
| 1957 | The Young Don't Cry | Max Cole | |
| 1959 | Kiss Her Goodbye | Corey Sherman | |
| 1963 | The Alfred Hitchcock Hour | Howard Raydon | Season 1 Episode 16: "What Really Happened" |
| 1964 | The Alfred Hitchcock Hour | Robert McBain | Season 2 Episode 16: "The Evil of Adelaide Winters" |
| 1964 | The Alfred Hitchcock Hour | Max Wilding | Season 3 Episode 11: "Consider Her Ways" |
| 1965 | Sylvia | Gavin Cullen | |
| 1969 | Daddy's Gone A-Hunting | Dr. Blanker | |
