= Ruth Attaway =

American actress (1910–1987)

- Born: June 28, 1910; Greenville, Mississippi, U.S.
- Died: September 21, 1987 (aged 77); New York City, U.S.
- Occupations: Actress, social worker
- Years active: 1936–1979
- Spouse: Allan Morrison (died 1968)

Ruth Attaway (June 28, 1910 – September 21, 1987) was an American film and stage actress. Among the films she appeared in are Raintree County (1957), Porgy and Bess (1959) and Being There (1979).

== Early life ==
Attaway was born on June 28, 1910, in Greenville, Mississippi. She was the daughter of physician W.A. Attaway, PhD. Her siblings included a sister, Florence, and a brother, novelist and writer William. She graduated from the University of Illinois at Urbana–Champaign, where she majored in sociology.

== Career ==
=== Theatre work ===
Attaway made her Broadway debut in 1936 in the Pulitzer Prize winning play, You Can't Take It with You.

Attaway was the first director of the New York Players Guild, a black repertory theater company formed in New York in 1945.

From 1954 to 1955, Attaway portrayed Anna Hicks in the play Mrs. Patterson at the National Theater.

From 1964 to 1967, Attaway was with the Repertory Society of Lincoln Center.

=== Film work ===
Attaway made her film debut by portraying Moll in The President's Lady (1953), opposite Susan Hayward and Charlton Heston. She went on to play a variety of characters in film such as Philomena in The Young Don't Cry (1957), Serena in Porgy and Bess (1959), Edna in Conrack (1974) and Louise in Being There (1979).

=== Television work ===
In 1954, Attaway was within the cast of an unaired pilot titled Three's Company.

She also played Delia in the 1978 television movie, The Bermuda Depths.

=== Other ventures ===
In addition to acting, Attaway was also trained as a social worker and, between acting jobs, worked with the American Red Cross, the New York State Department of Social Welfare and New York's Metropolitan Hospital.

=== Honors ===
On November 10, 1953, Attaway was one of three people cited by the Coordinating Council For Negro Performers at a special benefit in Harlem.

== Personal life and death ==
Attaway was married to Allan Morrison, an editor of Ebony. He died on May 29, 1968, at the age of 51.

Attaway died on September 21, 1987, in New York Hospital of injuries resulting from a Manhattan apartment fire. She was 77 years old.

== Partial filmography ==
- The President's Lady (1953) - Moll
- The Young Don't Cry (1957) - Philomena
- Raintree County (1957) - Parthenia (uncredited)
- Porgy and Bess (1959) - Serena Robbins
- Terror in the City (1964) - Farmer's Wife
- Conrack (1974) - Edna
- The Taking of Pelham One Two Three (1974) - Mayor's Nurse
- The Bermuda Depths (1978) - Delia
- Being There (1979) - Louise (final film role)
