= The Young Don't Cry =

1957 film by Alfred L. Werker

- Directed by: Alfred L. Werker
- Written by: Richard Jessup
- Produced by: Philip A. Waxman
- Starring: Sal Mineo; James Whitmore; J. Carrol Naish
- Cinematography: Ernest Haller
- Edited by: Maurice Wright
- Music by: George Antheil
- Production company: Columbia Pictures
- Distributed by: Columbia Pictures
- Release date: July 26, 1957
- Running time: 89 minutes
- Country: United States
- Language: English

The Young Don't Cry is a 1957 American film noir crime film directed by Alfred L. Werker and starring Sal Mineo, James Whitmore and J. Carrol Naish.

== Plot ==
An all-boys orphanage is not far from a prison camp near a swamp. Leslie Henderson, a teen boy, gets to know one of the convicts, Rudy Krist, who saved Les's life from a rattlesnake.

Les stands up for a defenseless boy when bully Tom Bradley makes fun of a boat the boy made. Les is punished at the orphanage by a week of his summer vacation being taken away. Successful businessman Max Cole mocks boys like Les who look out for anybody but themselves. At the prison, Rudy and his inmate friend Doosy are treated inhumanely by a brutal warden, Plug.

Les decides to let Rudy know where the boat is, in case it can help him escape. When he sees Rudy flee in one direction, Doosy runs the other way, but is hunted down by prison dogs and killed. Rudy vows revenge but he, too, ends up dead. Cole feels sorry for Les and offers him a job, but Les has other plans for how to spend the rest of his life.

== Cast ==
- Sal Mineo as Leslie Henderson
- James Whitmore as Rudy Krist
- J. Carrol Naish as Plug
- Gene Lyons as Max Cole
- Paul Carr as Tom Bradley
- Thomas A. Carlin as Johnny Clancy
- Leigh Whipper as Doosy
- Stefan Gierasch as Billy
- Victor Throley as Whittaker
- Dolores Rosedale as Mrs. Maureen Cole (as Roxanne)
- James Reese as Mr. Gwinn
- Ruth Attaway as Philomena
- Leland Mayforth as Allan
- Richard Wigginton as Jimmy
- Stanley Martin as Stanley Brown

== See also ==
- List of American films of 1957

== Bibliography ==
- Lawrence Frascella & Al Weisel. Live Fast, Die Young: The Wild Ride of Making Rebel Without a Cause. Simon and Schuster, 2005.
