= Buzema =

- Location in Libya
- Coordinates: 24°53′57.98″N 22°01′40.86″E
- Country: Libya
- Region: Cyrenaica
- District: Kufra
- Time zone: UTC+2 (EET)

Buzema is an oasis in the Libyan Desert in the Kufra District of Libya, about 150 km northwest of Kufra. It has a surface of 230 km^{2} and stretches in a semicircle around an 18 km long salt lake. Buzema lies to the bottom of a mountain range where the remains of a Toubou fortification system are still visible. The oasis trees (palm, fig, tamarisk, acacia) bear a lot of fruit due to the abundance of fresh water. On the northwest shore of the lake lies a village.
