= Al Jawf =

Al-Jawf or Al-Jouf (Arabic: الجوف) may refer to:

- Al-Jouf Province, Saudi Arabia
- Al-Jawf Governorate, Yemen
- Al Jawf, Libya, a town in Kufra
