= The Bermuda Depths =

1978 film

- Original U.S. TV advertisement
- Genre: Adventure; Fantasy; Science fiction
- Written by: William Overgard; Arthur Rankin Jr.
- Directed by: Tsugunobu Kotani(小谷承靖) (credited as Tom Kotani)
- Starring: Leigh McCloskey; Carl Weathers; Connie Sellecca; Julie Woodson; Burl Ives; Ruth Attaway
- Music by: Maury Laws
- Countries of origin: Japan; United States
- Original language: English

Production
- Producers: Arthur Rankin Jr. Jules Bass
- Cinematography: Jeri Sopanen
- Editor: Barry Walter
- Running time: 98 minutes (U.S. version); 90 minutes (Japanese edited version); 102 minutes (Japanese unedited version)
- Production companies: Rankin/Bass Productions; Tsuburaya Productions

Original release
- Network: ABC
- Release: January 27, 1978

The Bermuda Depths is a Japanese/American co-production 1978 fantasy film originally broadcast as a made-for-TV movie written by Arthur Rankin Jr. of Rankin/Bass fame. Special effects and creature elements were handled by Tsuburaya Productions, most famous for the Ultraman franchise. The film first aired in the United States January 27, 1978 on ABC, and was later released to theaters in Japan.

== Plot ==
On a Bermuda beach, a sleeping man, Magnus Dens, is approached by a beautiful but mysterious woman, Jennie Haniver, who seems to recognize him. In the meantime, Magnus is dreaming of his childhood, playing on the same beach, watching a turtle egg hatch with his friend Jennie. Jumping a few years later, both are playing with a grown turtle, Magnus carves "J+M" inside a heart on the turtle's shell while Jennie makes a cowrie shell necklace for Magnus. The scene then shifts to young Magnus on the beach spotting Jennie riding the turtle, heading out to open sea and disappearing beneath the water as he calls after her, then shifts again to his nightmare of the night his father, Lionel, was knocked into the water by an unseen horror in the cave beneath the house and part of his house on a cliff crumbling down to the beach as the storm rages on.

Finally awakening and groggily gathering his things to go to town, Magnus sees a woman swimming in the ocean. He meets his childhood friend, Eric, at the docks. When Eric asks him where he has been, he admits he has been drifting for a few years. Eric introduces Magnus to Dr. Paulis, whom Eric is working for to finish his master's degree in marine biology. Suddenly, the boat lists violently to one side and the net they pulled up has been shredded by something very large and strong.

That evening, the three men are joined by Eric's wife, Doshan, for dinner at Dr. Paulis' house. He explains that he and Eric are doing teratology. Dr. Paulis calls out to Delia, their cook, to hurry up with dinner. Magnus is intrigued by the necklace she wears, which resembles his own.

After dinner, upon not getting answers to his question about his father's death from Dr. Paulis, Magnus steps outside. He again sees Jennie swimming by the boat. He jumps into the water to follow her, but he is saved from drowning and revived on the beach by the woman, whom he does not recognize. She returns to the ocean, telling him her name is Jennie Haniver. His description of the incident to Dr. Paulis is not taken seriously. Dr Paulis tells him the woman must have been joking with him, as "Jennie Haniver" is the name given to a sea creature of local folklore. But Delia later tells him the full legend; Jennie Haniver was a beautiful but vain woman who bargained with a mysterious god to save her from a violent storm at sea, and was granted eternal life at the cost of becoming a sea creature who can never again live on land.

The next morning, the police bring in Eric to examine enormous tracks on the beach. Magnus goes down to the beach and meets Jennie. Finally remembering her as his young playmate, he takes her to his father's wrecked house. He tells her some of his memories from childhood, while she describes the quadrilles her father would hold in their great hall. Then Eric calls him away to go out on a boat with Dr. Paulis. Again the boat lurches uncontrollably, forcing Eric to cut the cable to the trawling net.

In the evening, Magnus again confronts Dr. Paulis about his father's death. Paulis explains that Lionel was conducting tests regarding mutation in sea life when he was attacked and apparently eaten. Magnus asks him if he remembers the turtle from his childhood, and describes how he carved initials on the shell, for himself and Jennie. Paulis is dismayed.

Magnus awakens to Eric and Dr. Paulis arguing. Eric wants to use the Horror, a harpoon-firing bazooka. Paulis, aghast at the idea, withdraws his support for the expedition. Eric collects Magnus and heads out in the boat. After some trawling, they again find something dragging on the line. Taking a small harpoon gun, Eric dives to try to save the net. He shoots at a form he can see only vaguely. It turns out to be Jennie. Eric and Magnus resume trawling. Magnus tells Eric he had been with Jennie the night before on the beach, and how she was his friend from when he was young. Eric does not remember her, and dismisses her as an imaginary friend. The trawl lines finally catch the turtle, which is so large it begins to tear through the net. Eric blasts it with the Horror, and allows it to run out the line, waiting for it to resurface.

After sundown, the boat's power mysteriously gives out, the compass spins crazily. Magnus leaves the boat's cabin, finds Jennie on board the ship. She begs him to free the turtle, nebulously saying she made a promise long ago she will forever regret.

At Doshan's insistence, Dr. Paulis boards a helicopter to fly out to the boat. Upon arriving, he observes a huge shape underwater near the boat. The turtle surfaces, swimming quickly towards the helicopter, then leaping out of the water, sending the helicopter crashing into the ocean. Upon seeing the crash, Eric rushes out onto the deck, but is confronted by Jennie. To his horror, her eyes glow an eerie green, just as the turtle surfaces under the boat, capsizing it. Magnus climbs aboard the lifeboat amidst the wreckage and desperately tries to help Eric on board, but he is entangled in the line from the Horror. The turtle surfaces, its eyes glowing green exactly like Jennie's, before it dives down into the depths, dragging Eric helplessly behind.

Jennie approaches an unconscious Magnus lying face flat on the beach, sadly kisses him, then returns to the ocean for the last time.

Doshan approaches Magnus in the graveyard where his parents are buried and expresses her horror at the losses of her husband and Dr. Paulis. Magnus tells her he is leaving Bermuda and wants nothing to do with the sea ever again. He walks away without noticing the statue of Jennie and the inscription "Jennie Haniver, 1701- , Lost at Sea" on her gravestone.

On the ferry leaving Bermuda, Magnus removes the necklace Jennie had given him and sadly throws it into the sea. It sinks past the giant turtle, which is shown to have the same initials Magnus inscribed on its shell all those many years ago.

== Cast ==
- Leigh McCloskey as Magnus Dens
- Carl Weathers as Eric
- Connie Sellecca as Jennifer 'Jennie' Haniver
- Julie Woodson as Doshan
- Ruth Attaway as Delia
- Burl Ives as Dr. Paulis
- Elise Frick
- Nicholas Ingham
- Kevin Petty
- Nicole Marsh
- George Richards
- John Instone
- Jonathan Ingham
- Patricia Rego
- Doris Riley
- Tracy Anne Sadler

== Production ==
- Filming was done in Bermuda.
- The sounds made by the giant turtle are in fact humpback whale songs.
- The partnership between Rankin/Bass and Tsuburaya Productions also resulted in two more monster/adventure films: The Last Dinosaur (1977) and The Ivory Ape (1980).

== Music ==
The recurring classical theme is Vivaldi's Concerto in D Major RV. 93, II-Largo.

== Home media ==
It was released on DVD-R on-demand directly from the Warner Bros. Warner Archive shop.

Warner Bros. Warner Archive released the film on Blu-ray in March 2021, including both the 1.33:1 U.S. broadcast television version and the widescreen international theatrical version.
