= Calansho Desert =

Desert in eastern Libya

Coordinates: 27°49′03″N 020°58′30″E

Calanscio Desert (Sarīr Kalanshiyū, Calanscio Serir) is a desert in eastern Libya in Al Wahat District. It is part of the Sahara and has a hot desert climate (BWh). It is primarily rocky in the north and center, but forms part of the "Great Sand Sea" to the east and contains the Calanscio Sand Sea to the south. As Sarīr is the only settlement in the Sarīr Kalanshiyū. The Sarir oil field is located in the western Sarīr Kalanshiyū.

It is currently thought that the ancestral Nile flowed through what is now the Calanscio Desert during the Miocene.

== Climate ==
Like most inland deserts it is hot during the day and cold at night, with the average annual temperature being around 25 °C (77 °F). The warmest month is August, when the average temperature is 36 °C (97 °F) and the coldest is January, with 12 °C (54 °F). The average annual rainfall is less than 30 millimetres (1.2 in). The wettest month is May, with an average rainfall of 5 millimetres (0.20 in), and the driest is July, with 1 millimetre (0.039 in).
