= Rebiana, Libya =

Rebiana
- Oasis
- Location in Libya
- Coordinates: 24°14′N 21°59′E
- Country: Libya
- Region: Cyrenaica
- District: Kufra
- Elevation: 961 ft (293 m)

Population (2019)
  - Total: 8,000
- Time zone: UTC+2 (EET)

Rebiana (or Rabiana, Rabyanah, also called Erbehna, Arabic: موزي or ربيانة), in Tedaga called Muzui or Mouzi which is the original name of this place, is an oasis in the Libyan Desert, in the Cyrenaica region's Kufra District of Libya, about 120 km west of El Tag.

On one side of the oasis, which features many palm and mango trees, is a salt lake and a chain of hills; on the other are sand dunes. On the north edge of the oasis there is a village with a zaouia. The native inhabitants are members of the Toubou people; Al Tawatia and Bazama peoples have also settled there.

In 2014, the Libyan historian Saad Buhagar described the population of Rebiana as follows: "After some migration towards the big cities, for reasons of employment and comfort, between 1500 and 2000 individuals remain, most of them Tubu, and a small group of Zouia Arabs, most of them of the Bazama family, descendants of the Elmdjabra tribe, living in the Jalu oasis. The Tubu constitute the most ancient dwellers of the oasis, as they do in general in the Kufra region."

== See also ==
- Rebiana Sand Sea
