= Great Sand Sea =

Great Sand Sea بحر الرمال العظيم
- Desert
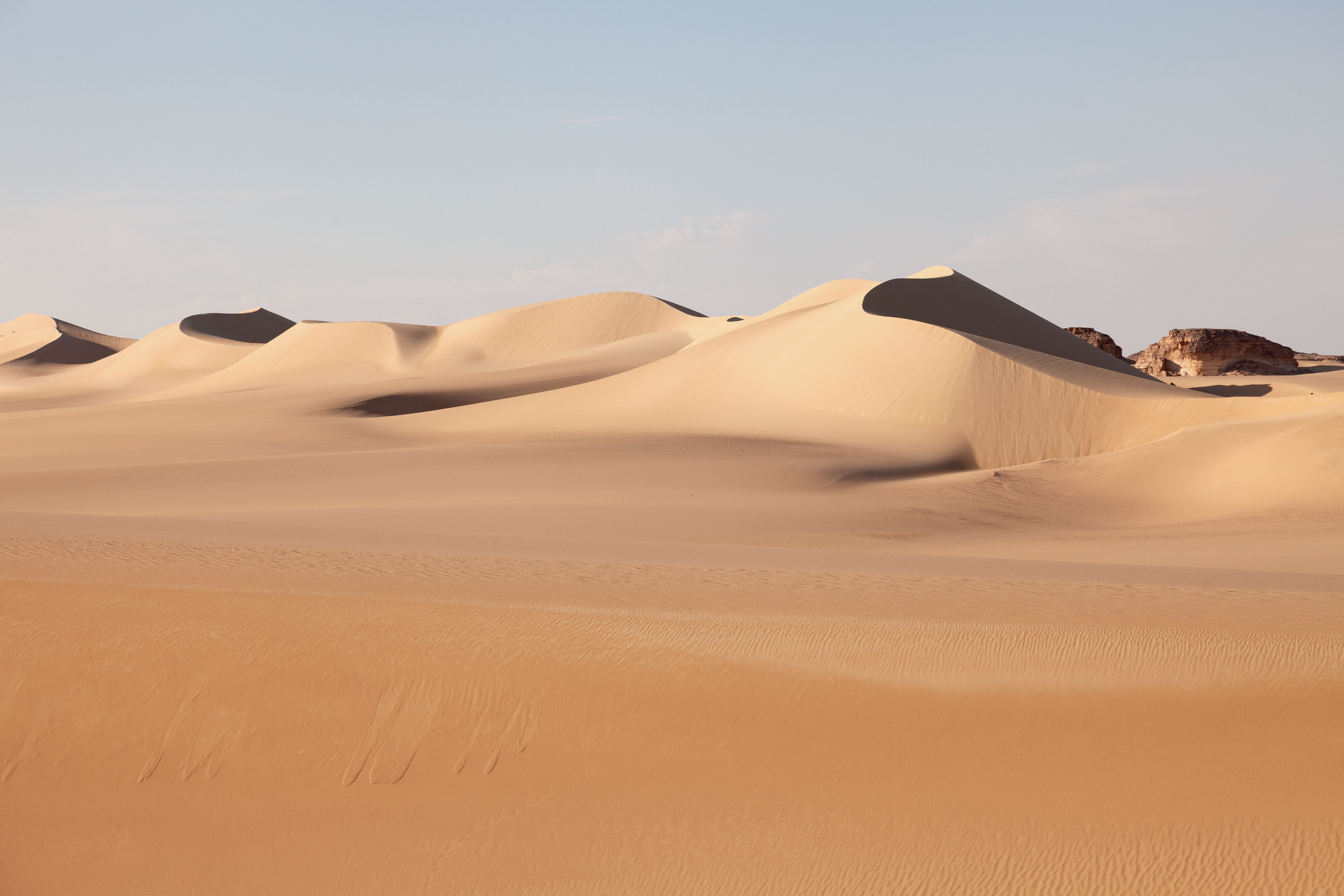
- The dunes of the Great Sand Sea near Siwa, Egypt

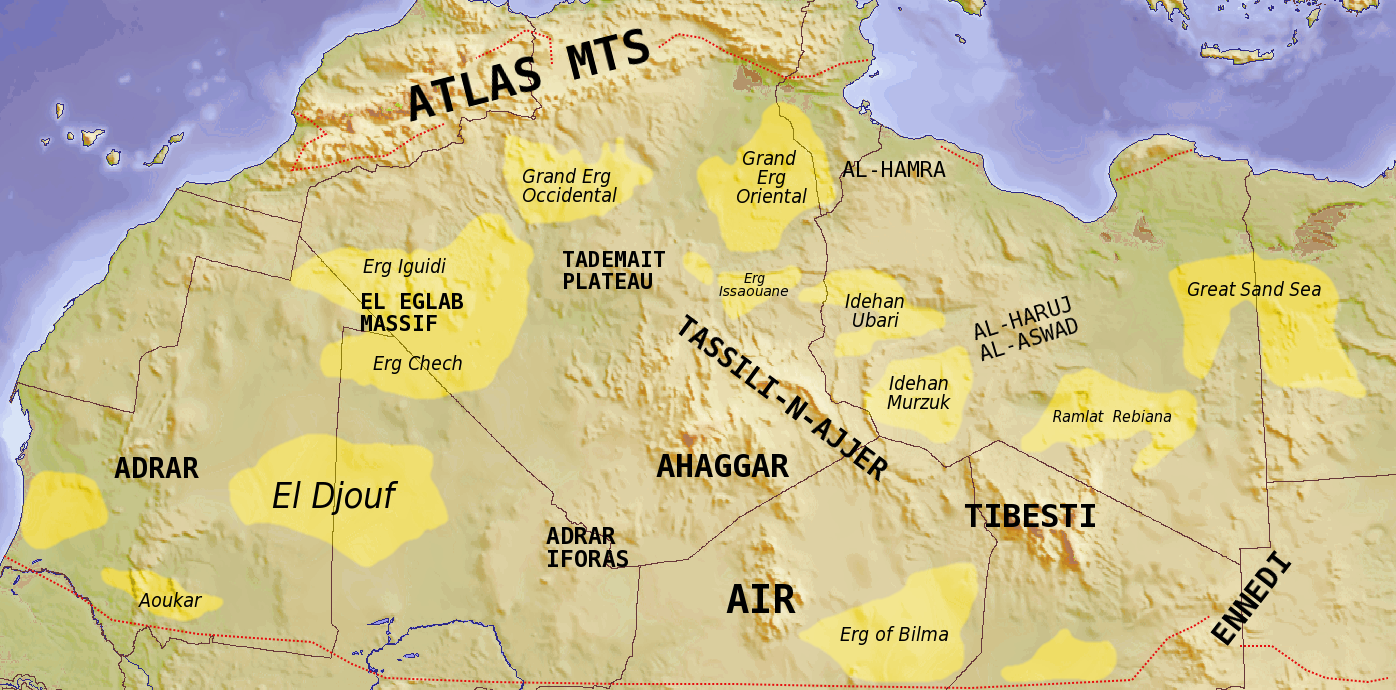
- Map of the topographic features of the Sahara

- Location within Egypt
- Coordinates: 26°54′0″N 26°2′0″E
- Country: Egypt and Libya

Area
  - Total: 72,000 km^{2} (28,000 sq mi)
- Elevation: 100 m (330 ft)

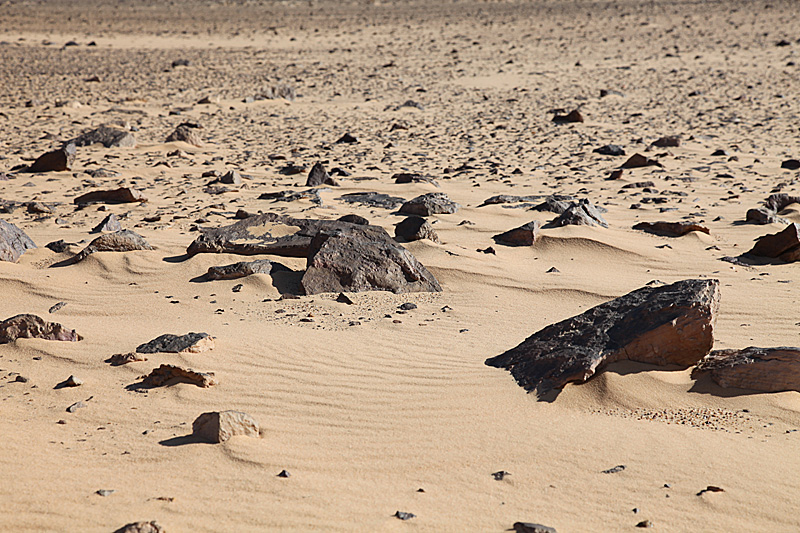
Stony area of the Great Sand Sea.

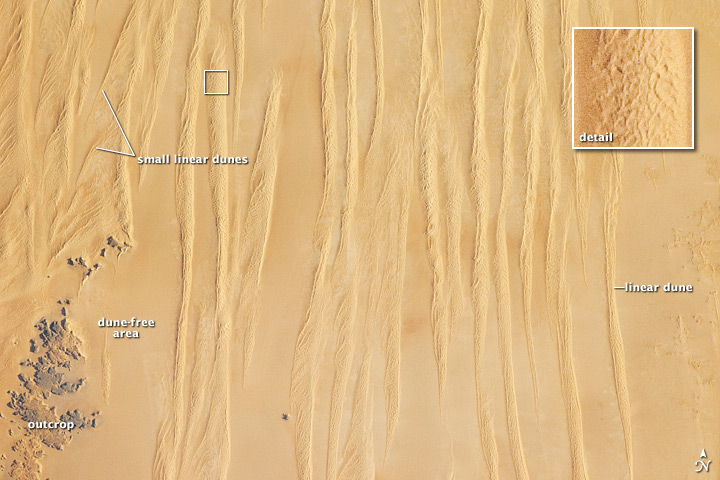
Dune pattern in the Great Sand Sea, Egypt. NASA Earth Observatory.

The Great Sand Sea is an approximately 72,000 km^{2} (28,000 mi^{2}) sand desert (erg) in the Sahara that stretches from western Egypt to eastern Libya, in North Africa. Most of the area is covered by sand dunes.

== Geography ==
The Great Sand Sea stretches about 650 km (400 mi) from north to south and 300 km (190 mi) from east to west. On satellite images, this desert shows a pattern of long sand ridges running in a roughly north-south direction. However, despite the apparent uniformity, the Great Sand Sea has two large areas with different types of megadunes. The Egyptian sand sea lies parallel to the Calanshio Sand Sea of Libya, with which it is contiguous in the north. The dunes of the Great Sand Sea cover about 10% of the total area of the Egyptian Western Desert.

Siwa is an oasis located in Egypt, about 50 km (30 mi) east of the Libyan border, in the eastern part of the Great Sand Sea or Egyptian Sand Sea.

Although well-known to the Tuareg and traders who traveled with caravans across the Sahara, Friedrich Gerhard Rohlfs was the first European to document the Great Sand Sea. He began his Saharan expeditions in 1865, and named the great expanse of dunes the Große Sandmeer (Great Sand Sea), but it was not until 1924 with the maps of Egyptian courtier Ahmed Hassanein that the full scope of the Great Sand Sea was appreciated by Europeans.

== In popular culture ==
- In the 2017 Ubisoft game Assassin's Creed Origins, the Great Sand Sea is featured as one of the nomes, or regions.

== See also ==
- Great Sand Sea Glass – Desert glass found in Libya and Egypt
- Libyan Desert – North-eastern part of the Sahara Desert
- Sahara – Desert on the African continent
