= El Tag =

El Tag التاج
- Village
- Location in Libya
- Coordinates: 24°12′33.82″N 23°19′41.14″E
- Country: Libya
- Region: Cyrenaica
- District: Kufra
- Time zone: UTC +2

El Tag (Arabic: التاج, romanized: at-Tāj; also Al-Tag, Al-Taj) is a village and holy site in the Kufra Oasis, within the Libyan Desert subregion of the Sahara. It is in the Kufra District in the southern Cyrenaica region of southeastern Libya. The Arabic el tag translates as "crown" in English, and derives from the site's position above the Kufra basin. El Tag, being on a rise, is without an oasis spring and native date palm habitat.

== Senussi ==
El-Tag was founded in 1895 by Muhammad El-Mahdi es-Senussi (1844–1902), after the Ottomans forced him and the Senussi Order from Jaghbub in the Cyrenaican desert to Kufra. He was the son of the founder and the supreme leader (1859–1902) of the Order. El-Mahdi founded a Zaouia (madrassa – school) with a mosque with a low octagonal minaret tower here. He also built several tombs of the Senussi family here, which later included his own, therefore making El-Tag a Senussi holy place.

== Italians and World War II ==
During the colonial Italian Libya period, the Italians built a World War I-style fort in El Tag in the mid-1930s. Although some guns were stationed at the fort, its battlements were out of date and of little use in the mobile warfare tactics of World War II. The fort, airfield, and town of Kufra were taken by Free French forces and the British-New Zealand Long Range Desert Group in the 1941 Capture of Kufra, in the Allies World War II Western Desert Campaign.

== Sources ==
- Bertarelli, L.V. (1929). Guida d'Italia, Vol. XVII (in Italian). Milano: Consociazione Turistica Italiana.
