= Al Jawf, Libya =

Al Jawf الجوف
- Town
- Location in Libya
- Coordinates: 24°13′N 23°18′E
- Country: Libya
- Region: Cyrenaica
- District: Kufra
- Elevation: 1,253 ft (382 m)

Population (2022)
  - Total: 18,587
- Time zone: UTC+2 (EET)

Al Jawf (Arabic: الجوف Al Ğawf) is a town in southeastern Libya, the capital of the Kufra district in Libya.

The city has an elevation of 382.2 m (1,254 feet). In 2022, the city's population was 18,587. Al Jawf receives almost no rain, averaging only 2.5 millimetres or 0.1 inches per year. Summer high temperatures average above 38 °C or 100 °F.

The city lies in the largest oasis in the Kufra basin, extracting the water from the Nubian Sandstone Aquifer System. It is one of the most heavily irrigated oases in the Sahara. The surrounding area contains clusters of center-pivot irrigation systems used for agriculture. The distinctive pattern was photographed from orbit by the crew of the International Space Station in 2016.

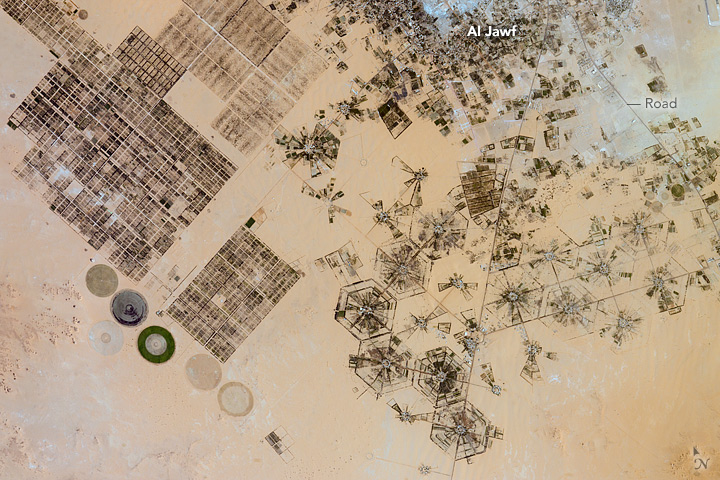
Irrigation at Al Jawf oasis

== Climate ==
Al Jawf has a hot desert climate (Köppen climate classification BWh).

Climate data for Al Jawf
Month	Jan	Feb	Mar	Apr	May	Jun	Jul	Aug	Sep	Oct	Nov	Dec	Year
Mean daily maximum °C (°F)	21 (69)	23 (74)	28 (82)	33 (91)	36 (97)	39 (102)	38 (100)	38 (101)	36 (96)	32 (90)	27 (81)	23 (73)	31 (88)
Daily mean °C (°F)	11 (51)	13 (55)	16 (61)	20 (68)	24 (75)	27 (81)	28 (83)	29 (85)	25 (77)	22 (71)	18 (64)	12 (53)	20 (68)
Mean daily minimum °C (°F)	5 (41)	7 (44)	10 (50)	15 (59)	19 (67)	22 (72)	23 (73)	23 (74)	21 (69)	17 (62)	12 (53)	7 (45)	15 (59)
Average precipitation mm (inches)	2.5 (0.1)	0 (0)	0 (0)	0 (0)	0 (0)	0 (0)	0 (0)	0 (0)	0 (0)	0 (0)	0 (0)	0 (0)	2.5 (0.1)
Source: Weatherbase

== Sources ==
- Bertarelli, L.V. (1929). Guida d'Italia, Vol. XVII (in Italian). Milano: Consociazione Turistica Italiana.
