= Tazirbu =

Tazerbu
- Location in Libya
- Coordinates: 25°39′51.49″N 21°02′42.94″E
- Country: Libya
- Region: Cyrenaica
- District: Kufra

Population (2006)
  - Total: 6,600
- Time zone: UTC+2 (EET)

Tazerbu (Arabic: تازربو) is an oasis located in the Libyan Desert in the Kufra District of Libya, about 250 km to the northwest of Kufra. The name means "main seat" in the Toubou language, because this was the seat of the Toubou Sultanate before the Arab conquest. The oasis is 25–30 km long and 10 km wide. In the middle of the oasis and parallel to it runs a shallow valley with salt ponds and salines. In Tazerbu there are about ten villages: the most important is called El-Jezeera. In the oasis grow groups of palms, tamarisks, acacias, esparto and Juncus. Several kilometers to the north of this village lie the ruins of an old castle, named Gasr Giránghedi, which was the seat of the Sultan. The first European to visit the oasis was the German geographer and explorer Gerhard Rohlfs in August 1879.

== Sources ==
- Bertarelli, L.V. (1929). Guida d'Italia, Vol. XVII (in Italian). Milano: Consociazione Turistica Italiana.
