= Kufra District =

District of Libya

Coordinates: 24°N 23°E

Kufra
- District
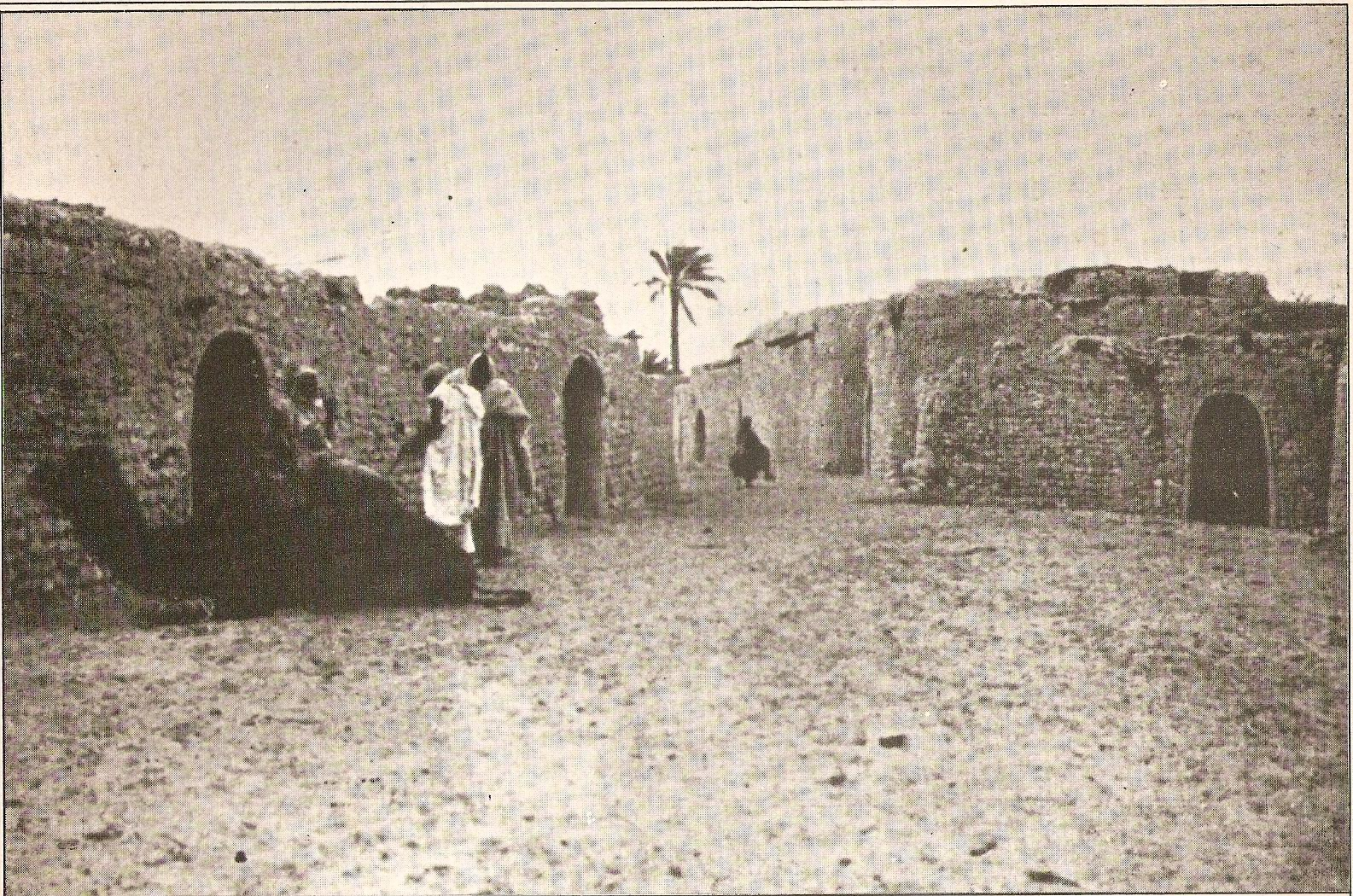
- Kufra in 1930

- Map of Libya with Kufra district highlighted
- Country: Libya
- Capital: Al Jawf

Area
  - Total: 453,611 km^{2} (175,140 sq mi)

Population (2006)
  - Total: 50,104
- License Plate Code: 20

Kufra, Kufrah or Kofra (Arabic: الكفرة Al Kufra), also spelled Cufra in Italian, is the largest district of Libya and the second-largest African administrative division. It is slightly smaller than the country of Turkmenistan. Its capital is Al Jawf, one of the oases in Kufra basin. There is a very large oil refinery near the capital. In the late 15th century, Leo Africanus reported an oasis in the land of the Berdoa, visited by a caravan coming from Awjila. It is possible that this oasis in question was either the Al Jawf or the Taiserbo oasis, and on early modern maps, the Al Kufra region was often labelled as Berdoa based on this report.

== History ==
The name Kufra is derived from the Arabic word kufr (كُفْر), which means "cover" or "concealment." Kufra did not fall under the dominion of either the Arabs or the Ottomans and was owned by the Arab Bedouin tribe of the Zuwayya only in the mid-19th century, and eventually by the Italians by the 1930s. In 1931, during the campaign of Cyrenaica, General Rodolfo Graziani easily conquered Kufra, considered a strategic region, leading about 3,000 infantry and artillery personnel, supported by about twenty bombers.

== Geography ==
Kufra's location in Libya's southeast places it on the country's border with Egypt, Sudan (unlike any other Libyan district), and Chad. It borders the following regions of these countries, namely, New Valley Governorate, Egypt in the east, Shamaliyah State, Sudan in the southeast, North Darfur State, Sudan in the far southeast, and Bourkou-Ennedi-Tibesti Region, Chad in the south. Domestically, it borders the following districts, namely, Murzuq in the west, Jufra in the northwest and Al Wahat in the north. Kufra is a part of Cyrenacian geographical subdivision, the largest region in Libya and which is mostly semi-arid in nature. The region receives average annual rainfall of 5 in (130 mm). There are no perennial rivers in the region, although it is abundant with groundwater aquifers. The terrain of all three regions of the county is mostly a flat undulating plain and occasional plateau, with an average elevation of around 423 m (1,388 ft). Around 91 per cent of the land is covered by desert, with only 8.8 per cent agricultural land (with only 1% arable lands) and 0.1 per cent of forests. It is desert climate in all other parts of the region. Dust storms lasting four to eight days are fairly common during the spring.

Per 2006 census, there were totally 13,313 economically active people in the district. There were 6,295 government employees, 2,178 employers, 6,454 first level workers, and 1 second level worker. There were 85 workers in state administration, 85 in agriculture, animal husbandry and forestry, 2,445 in agriculture and hunting, 2,029 in education, 1,558 in private enterprises, 584 in health and social work, 85 in production, 2,214 in technical work, and 354 service workers. The total enrollment in schools was 17,364 and the number of people above secondary stage and less than graduation was 875. As per the report from World Health Organization (WHO), there was one communicable disease centre, one dental clinic, one general clinic, three out-patient clinics, five pharmacies, 16 PHC centres, one rural clinic, and no specialized clinics.

== Local administration ==
During 2007, the northern part of Kufra District was moved to the newly created Al Wahat District. Besides the main Oasis group of the Kufra basin, four more oases belong to the region, which lie northwest of Kufra basin are Rebiana, Buzema, Wadi Zighen and Tazirbu. The oasis-valleys of Jabal Arkanu and Jebel Uweinat lie southeast of the basin. Libya became independent in 1951 from the colonial empire and generally known for its oil rich resources. As a part of decentralization in 2012, the country is administratively split into 13 regions from the original 25 municipalities, which were further divided in 1,500 communes. As of 2016, there were 22 administrative divisions in the country in the form of districts.
