= Route of the 2nd Armoured Division =

Historical military route

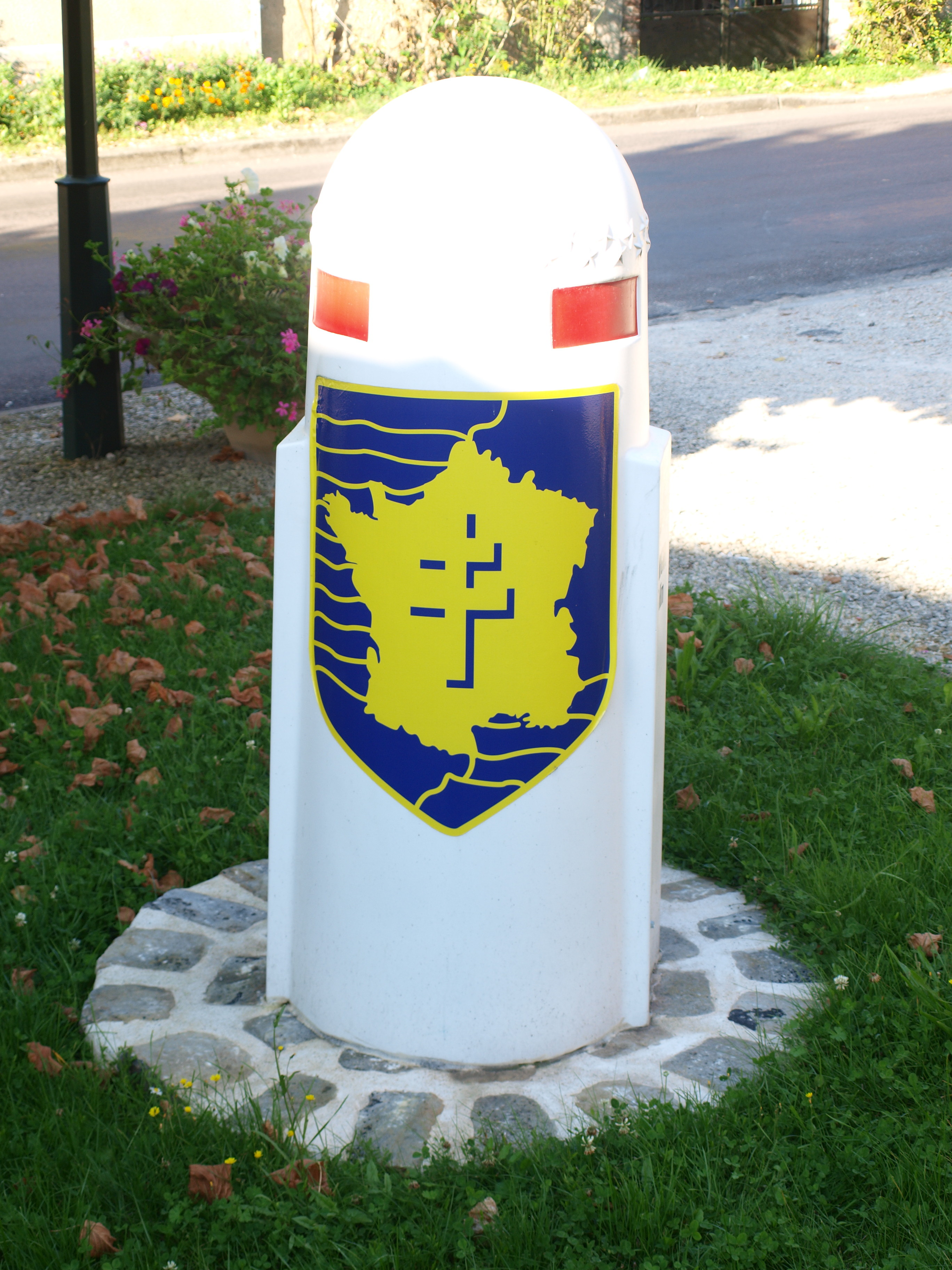
Marker at Fleurigny, showing the face with the divisional emblem

The Route of the 2nd Armoured Division (French: Voie de la 2e Division Blindée) is a series of commemorative bollards marking the route taken by the French 2nd Armoured Division during the liberation of France in 1944. The route runs from Saint-Martin-de-Varreville on the English Channel coast, where the division landed in August 1944, to Strasbourg which was liberated by the division in November in completion of General Philippe Leclerc's Oath of Kufra. The scheme was set up in 2004 by the mayor of Saint-Martin and is now administered by the Leclerc Foundation. Individual municipalities apply to the foundation for permission to install bollards, and some 283 have been determined to be eligible to do so. Around 100 bollards have been installed so far.

== 2nd Armoured Division ==
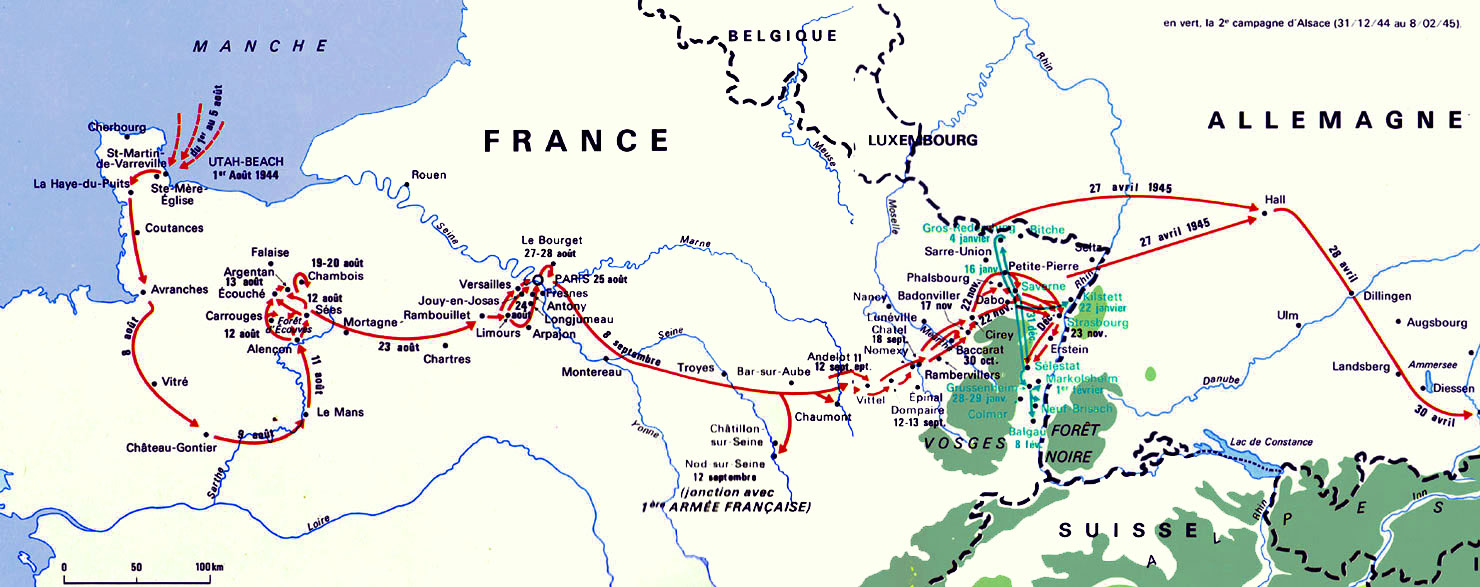
Route of the 2nd Armoured Division 1944-45

The 2nd Armoured Division (in French: 2e Division Blindée), under General Philippe Leclerc, was the most famous and effective formation of the Free French Forces during the Second World War. Initially a smaller formation that fought in Africa, the division was involved in the capture of Kufra, Libya, in March 1941 where Leclerc and his men swore the Oath of Kufra: "to lay down their arms only when our colors, our beautiful colors, fly over Strasbourg cathedral". The division was transferred to the United Kingdom in spring 1944, where it was expanded and equipped with American-made tanks. Assigned to General George Patton's Third Army, the formation landed in France on 1 August, following the Invasion of Normandy. The 2nd Armoured Division progressed through northern France to liberate Paris on 20 August and Strasbourg, near the German border, on 23 November. The formation afterwards crossed into Germany where it was involved in the capture of Berchtesgaden, towards the end of the war.

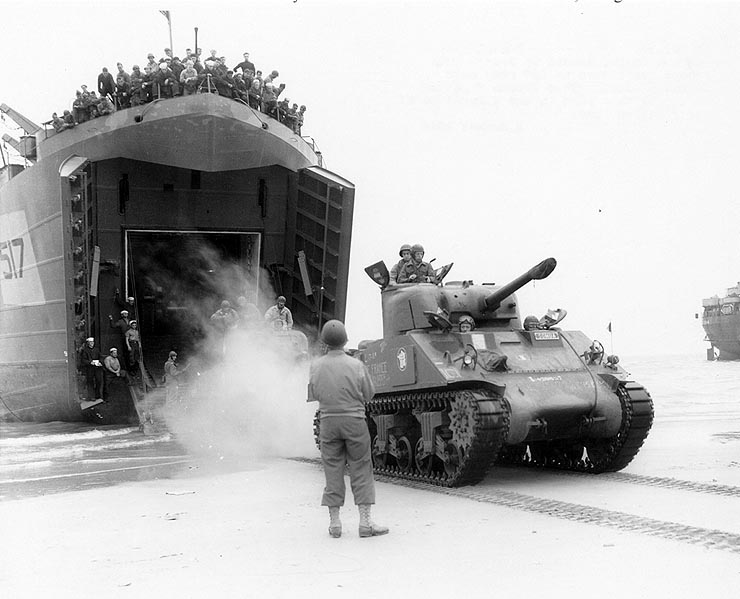
A 2nd Armoured Division tank lands on Utah beach, 2 August 1944

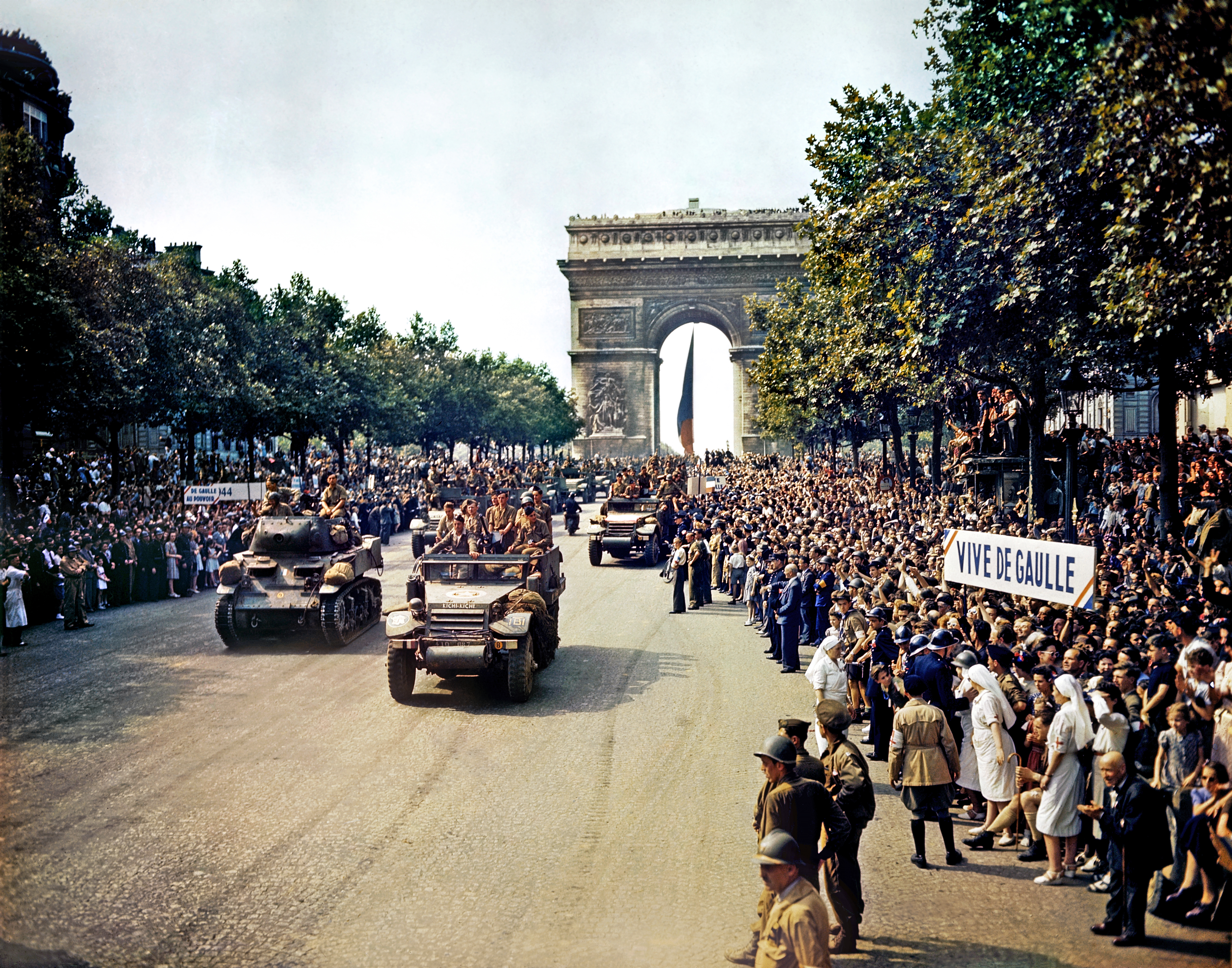
Vehicles of the division parade along the Champs Elysees, 26 August 1944

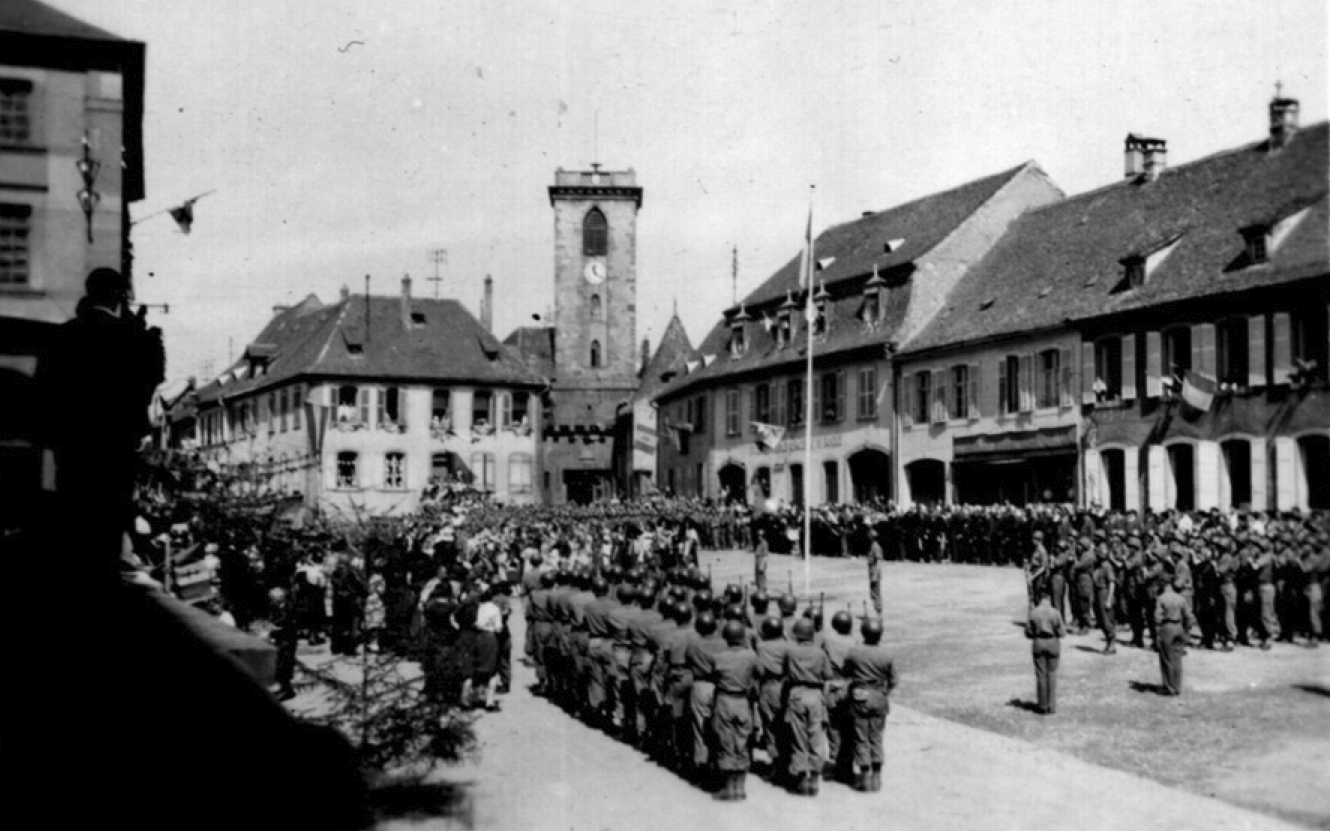
Liberation ceremony in Wasselonne, November 1944

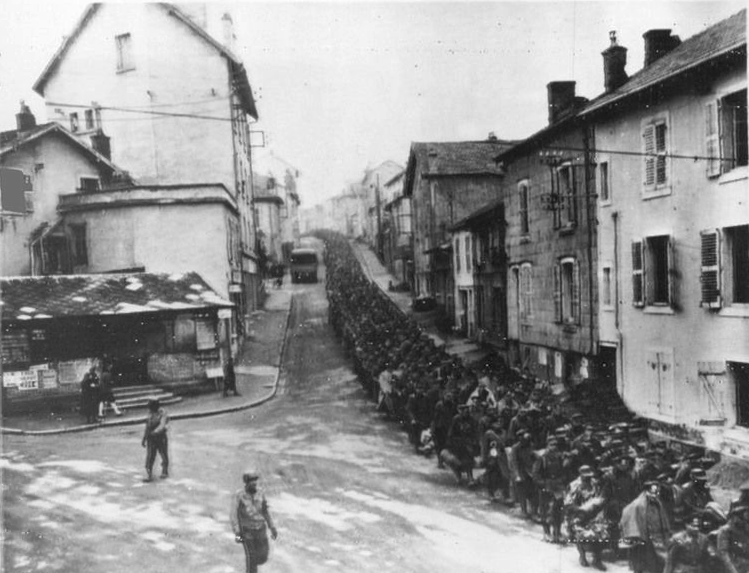
German prisoners taken in Strasbourg, 7 December 1944

== History of the route ==
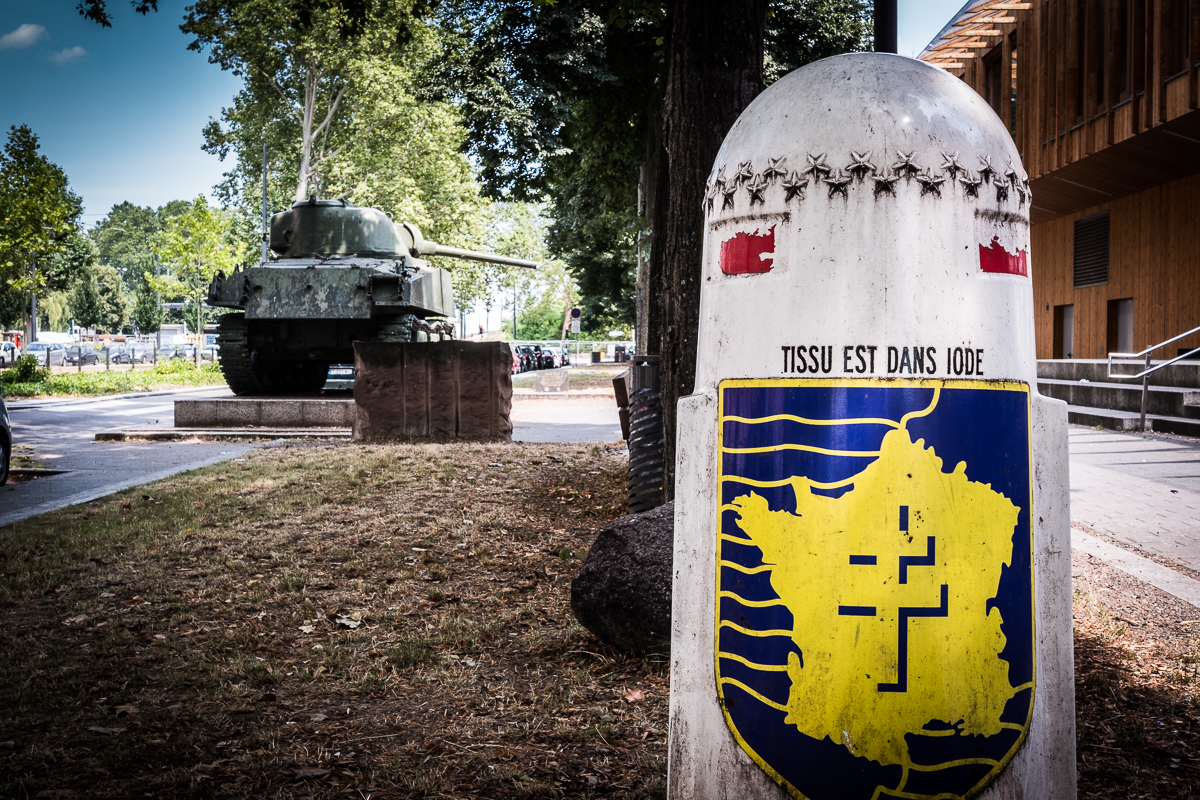
Marker and tank monument at Port du Rhin, Strasbourg. The additional text "tissu est dans iode" ("tissue is in Iodine") is a code phrase used by the French to announce the capture of the city.

The route was the idea of the mayor of Saint-Martin-de-Varreville, Ghyslène Lebarbenchon, in 2004. She wanted to mark the route of the division which advanced from the village on 1 August 1944. Other municipalities along the route also installed markers over the following years. It took ten years, until 21 September 2014, for the route to be formally inaugurated.

The installation of markers is managed by the Leclerc Foundation, to which individual municipalities must apply. Some 109 markers are planned for the entire route. By May 2017 80 markers had been installed and 98 were in place by June 2018. Some of the marker posts have been ceremoniously "baptised" by being washed in the incoming tide of the English Channel before being installed. Some of the marker posts have been linked by a cycle path and a Michelin green guide has been produced for the overall route and made available free of charge.

The foundation has identified some 283 municipalities that were crossed or liberated by the division in France and so are eligible for a marker. One exception to the usual rules has been permitted. The foundation approved a request from Grugé-l'Hôpital in Maine-et-Loire, Western France. This post marks the location from which Leclerc began his escape from occupied France in 1940. He obtained false identification documents from Grugé's town hall before travelling to the United Kingdom via Spain and Portugal.

== Description of the markers ==
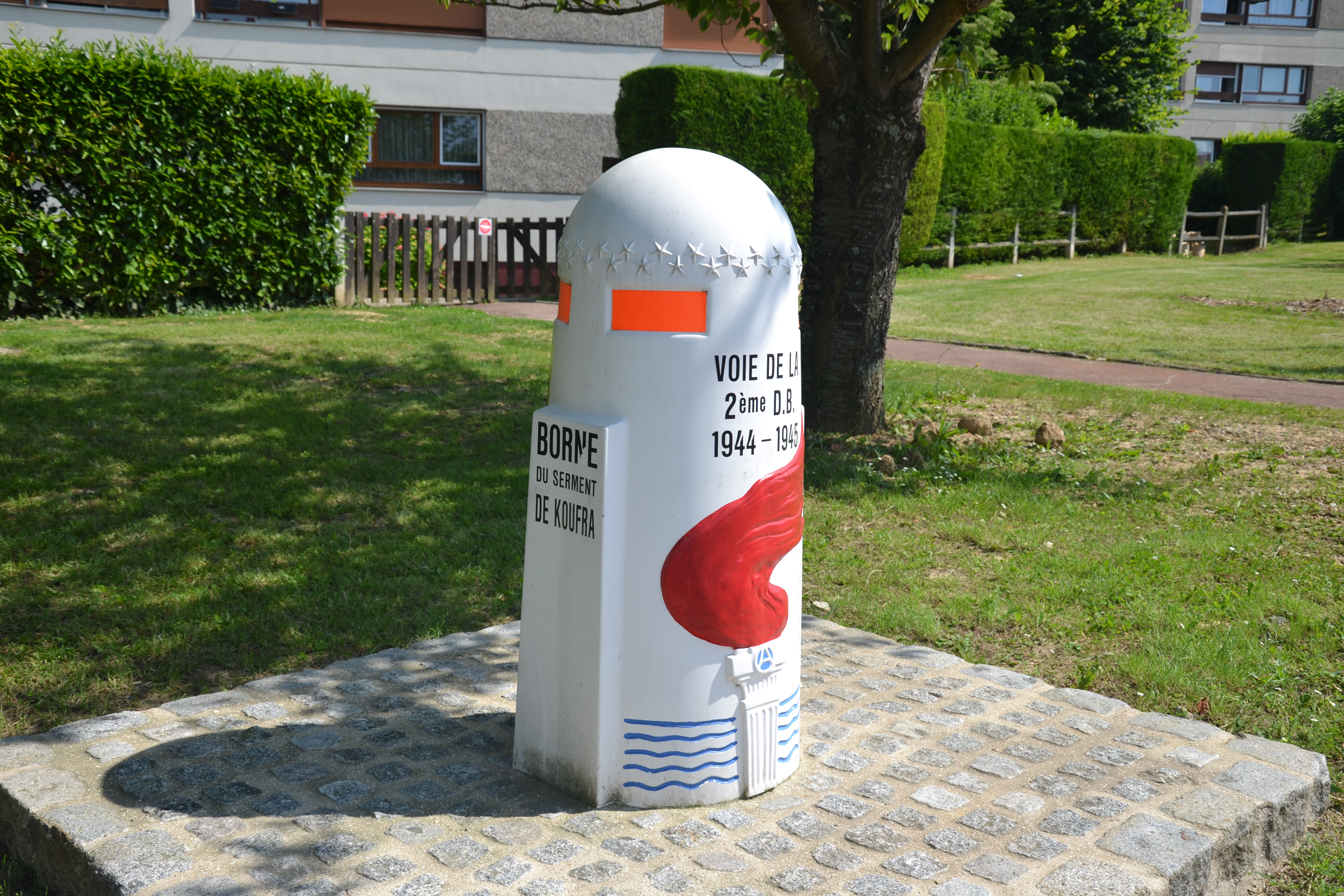
Marker in Longjumeau, Paris showing the face with the torch of liberty

The markers are made of white resin. One side is marked with a red torch of liberty; the blue and white "A" badge of the Third Army and the words "Voie de la / 2ème D. B. / 1944-1945". The opposite side is marked with the emblem of the 2nd Armoured Division: a blue and yellow map of France superimposed with the Cross of Lorraine. In between the main emblems are two flat panels: one shows the name of the locality and distance along the route from Saint-Martin-de-Varreville and the other the words "Borne du serment de Koufra" (Marker of the Koufra Oath). The distance shown is determined by the municipality in which the marker is sited and not determined by any single method so may not be consistent when compared with adjacent markers. The top of the bollard is domed, below this the circumference is marked with the 48 stars of the 1912–1959 American flag.

Adjacent to each terminal two information panels are provided. One is common across all terminals and provides the history of the division during the war; the second panel is specific to each location and provides local history and the actions of the division in the locality during the war.
