= Jebel Sherif =

Mountain in southeastern Libya

Coordinates: 23°13′13.7″N 22°47′33.8″E

Jebel Sherif (Arabic: جبل شريف, Jabal ash Sherif) is a mountain in southeastern Libya, about 130 km southwest of Kufra. It was the site of an action during the Battle of Kufra.
