= Air Libya =

Airline of Libya

IATA	ICAO	Call sign
7I	TLR	AIR LIBYA
- Founded: 1996; 29 years ago
- Hubs: Benina International Airport
- Fleet size: 5
- Headquarters: Benghazi, Libya
- Key people: Mohammed Abusaif-Chairman
- Website: airlibya.aero

Air Libya is a privately owned charter airline based in Benghazi, Libya. It was established in 1996 as Tibesti Air Libya, and was initially based in Tripoli. The company now operates charter flights in support of oil field operations, as well as providing some scheduled and "ad hoc" charter services. Its main base is at Benina International Airport in Benghazi.

AIR LIBYA was established by the late Mr. Mohamed Almukhtar Abousaif and stood out as the first privately owned airline to receive an AOC (Air Operator Certificate) in the country. It held a unique position as the sole aviation company headquartered in Benghazi. Initially, its focus was on agricultural aviation, commencing operations with a fleet comprising six Cessna 188AG-Truck, two Zlin-137, and one Cessna 185AG-Wagon aircraft. Two years later, the company expanded its fleet by acquiring a Cessna C402C and C421C.

It is on the List of airlines banned in the European Union.

== Destinations ==
=== Current destinations ===
As of January 2021, Air Libya does not serve any scheduled destinations.

=== Terminated destinations ===
- Agadez - Agadez Airport
- Alexandria - Alexandria International Airport
- Al-Fashir - El Fasher Airport
- Benghazi - Benghazi Airport
- Kufra - Kufra Airport
- N'Djamena - N'Djamena Airport
- Sabha - Sabha Airport
- Tobruk - Tobruk Airport

== Fleet ==
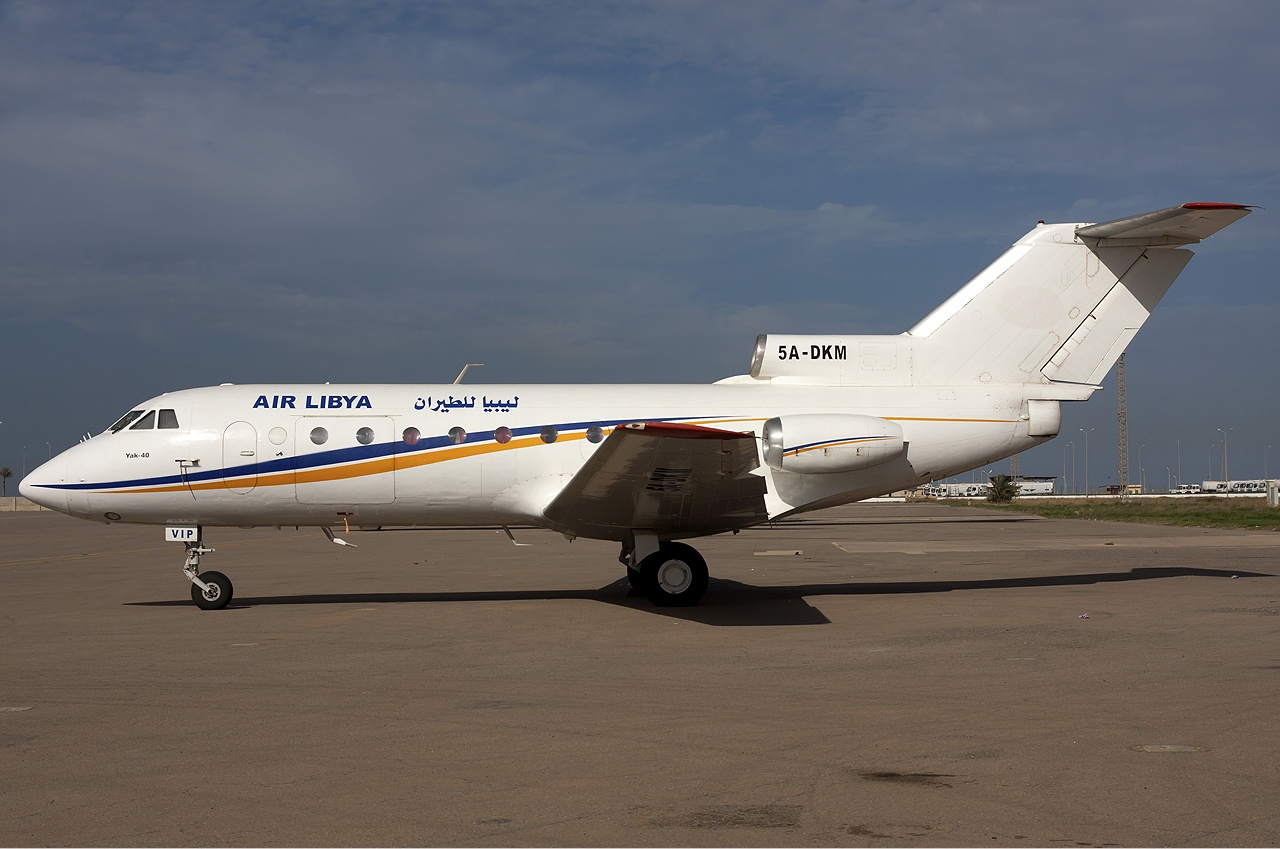
Air Libya, Yakovlev Yak-40, Mitiga, 2007

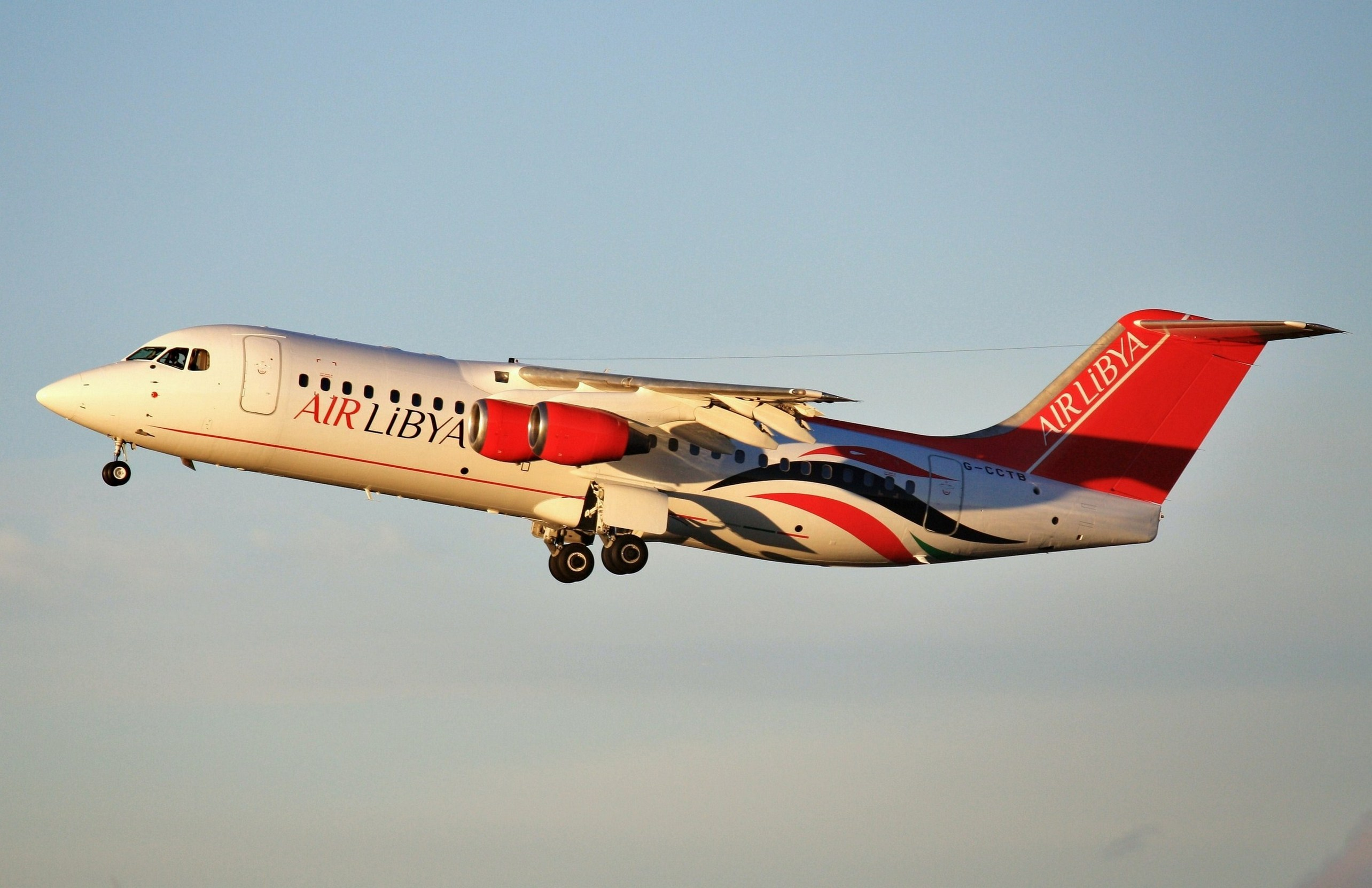
2012 photo of Air Libya plane with newer paint design

=== Current fleet ===
As of July 2026, Air Libya operates the following aircraft:

Air Libya fleet
Aircraft	In Service	Orders	Passengers		Notes
Aircraft	In Service	Orders	Y	Total	Notes
Avro RJ100	3	—	97	97	
Bombardier CRJ200LR	2	—			
Total	5	—			

=== Former fleet ===
As of August 2025, Air Libya operated 3 Avro RJ100 and 1 Bombardier CRJ200.

The airline also previously operated:

- 1 BAe 146-200
- 1 further Avro RJ100
- 1 Boeing 737-200
- 1 Boeing 737-500 (as of August 2017)
- 1 Yakovlev yak-40
