= Friedrich Gerhard Rohlfs =

German explorer (1831-1896)

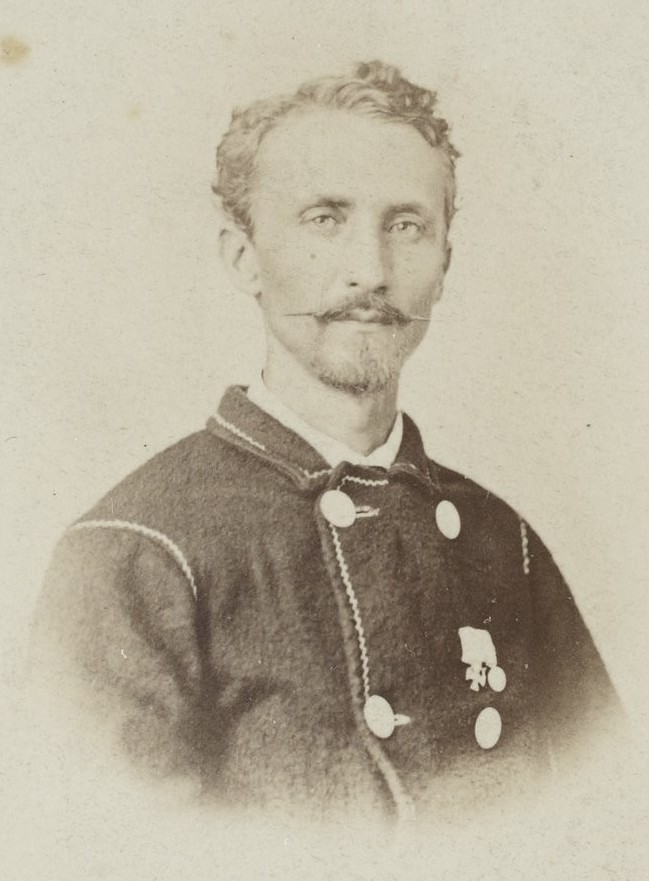
- Friedrich Gerhard Rohlfs
- Born: April 14, 1831; Vegesack, Germany
- Died: June 2, 1896 (aged 65); Rüngsdorf, Bonn, Germany
- Occupation: Explorer
- Years active: 1861-1885
- Known for: Exploring North West Africa

Friedrich Gerhard Rohlfs (14 April 1831 – 2 June 1896) was a German geographer, explorer, author and adventurer. Rohlfs served in the French Foreign Legion in a medical capacity and served in the First Schleswig War. He is most known for his exploration of North-West Africa, mainly the Atlas Mountains and the Sahara Desert.

== Biography ==
Friedrich Gerhard Rohlfs was born at Vegesack, later part of Bremen. His father was a physician, and encouraged Rohlfs to join the field of medicine. After the ordinary course at the gymnasium of Osnabrück, he entered the Bremen corps in 1848, and took part as a volunteer in the Schleswig-Holstein campaign, being made an officer after the battle of Idstedt (July 1850). Rohlfs then became a medical student, and studied at the universities of Heidelberg, Würzburg, and Göttingen. He wanted to travel, and joined the French Foreign Legion in a medical capacity, serving during the conquest of Kabylia. He attained the highest rank open to a foreigner, and was decorated for bravery as Chevalier of the Legion of Honour. Having learned Arabic and the mode of life of the inhabitants, in 1861 he went to Morocco, and was for some time personal physician to a nobleman there.

Rohlfs then set off on his own, exploring the oases of Morocco. During this trip he was attacked and left for dead, his leg almost severed from his body. These injuries would keep him from returning to Europe for most of his life, the cold weather aggravating them. In 1864 he continued his travels in Morocco, and crossed the Atlas Mountains to the oasis of Tuat. His description and map of the country were the first made from personal observation and with scientific knowledge.

After this trip, and a short visit to Germany, Rohlfs returned to Africa, and, disguised as an Arab (going so far as to have himself circumcised), was the first European to cross Africa from Tripoli across the Sahara desert via Lake Chad and along the Niger River and to present-day Lagos on the Gulf of Guinea from 1865 to 1867. He was the second European explorer to visit the region of the Draa River in southern Morocco. For this work he was awarded the Patron's Medal of the Royal Geographical Society of London in 1868. Rohlfs's detailed account of it is contained in the Ergänzungsheft ("Supplement") No. 34 to Petermann's Geographische Mittheilungen (Gotha, 1872).

At the close of 1867, by order of the King of Prussia, he joined the British punitive expedition to Abyssinia. He returned to Tripoli in 1868, and in 1869 traversed the desert from Tripoli to Alexandria, visiting the oasis of Siwah, site of the ancient cult of Jupiter Ammon. Returning to Germany, he married and settled down in Weimar.

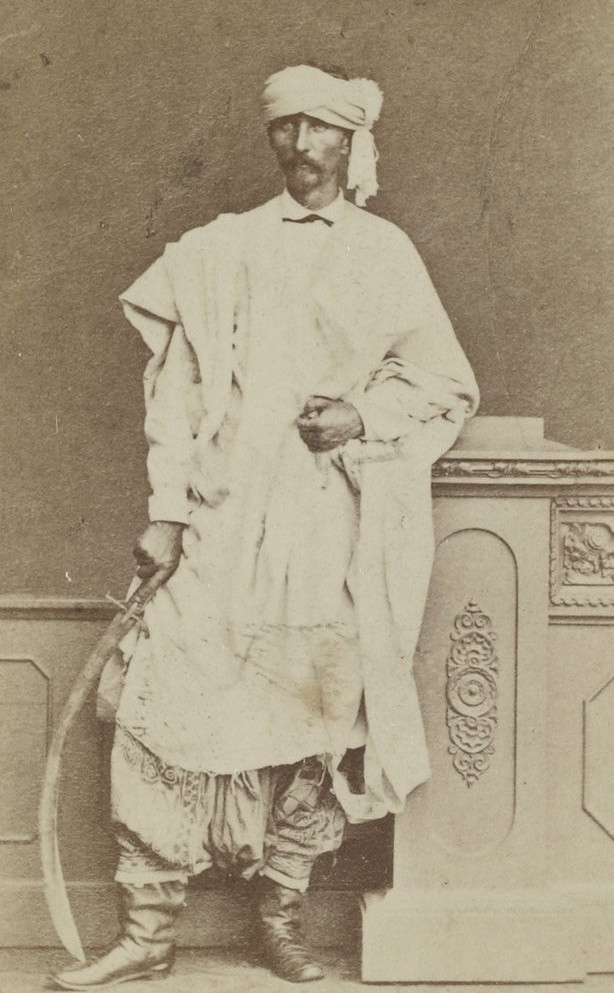
Rohlfs posing with a scimitar

In 1873, with an expedition of 100 camels and 90 men, organized under the patronage of Isma'il Pasha, the khedive of Egypt, Rohlfs explored the Libyan desert west of the chain of oases which skirt the valley of the Nile, and discovered that the depression called the Bahr Bela-ma (river without water), marked on many maps of the desert at that time, did not exist. Locals of Dakhla Oasis recounted a legend to the explorer Harding King, telling of Rohlfs arriving at the oasis in search of treasure at Deir al Hagar; claiming that he sacrificed one of the black workers of his entourage to the afrite guarding the treasure. It is possible that this is a testament to the cruel and exploitative treatment he would exhibit towards his workers. In 1874 Rohlfs set out from Dakhla Oasis intending to reach Kufra. By February the party was about 100 kilometres (62 mi) north of Abu Ballas (Pottery Hill) in the Western Desert, looking for a way around the dunes. Accompanied by Karl Zittel and a surveyor called Jordans, Rohlfs and his colleagues experienced a torrential downpour - a rare occurrence in the desert. Rohlfs' team restocked and watered their camels and built a cairn at the place he named Regenfeld ("Rain field"). The westward progress of the expedition continued to be hampered by the north–south dune ridges of the Great Sand Sea which the loaded camels were unable to climb. The party was forced to head northwest along the easier inter-dune corridors and reached Siwa.

In 1875, he visited the United States, and lectured on his travels. In 1878 Rohlfs and Anton Stecker (1855-1888) were commissioned by the German African Society to go to Wadai. They succeeded in reaching the oasis of Kufra, one of the chief centres of the Senussites, but being attacked by Arabs, they were obliged to retreat, making their way to the coast at Benghazi, reaching there in October 1879. In 1880 Rohlfs accompanied Stecker on an exploring expedition to Abyssinia; but after delivering a letter from the German emperor to the Negus, he returned to Europe.

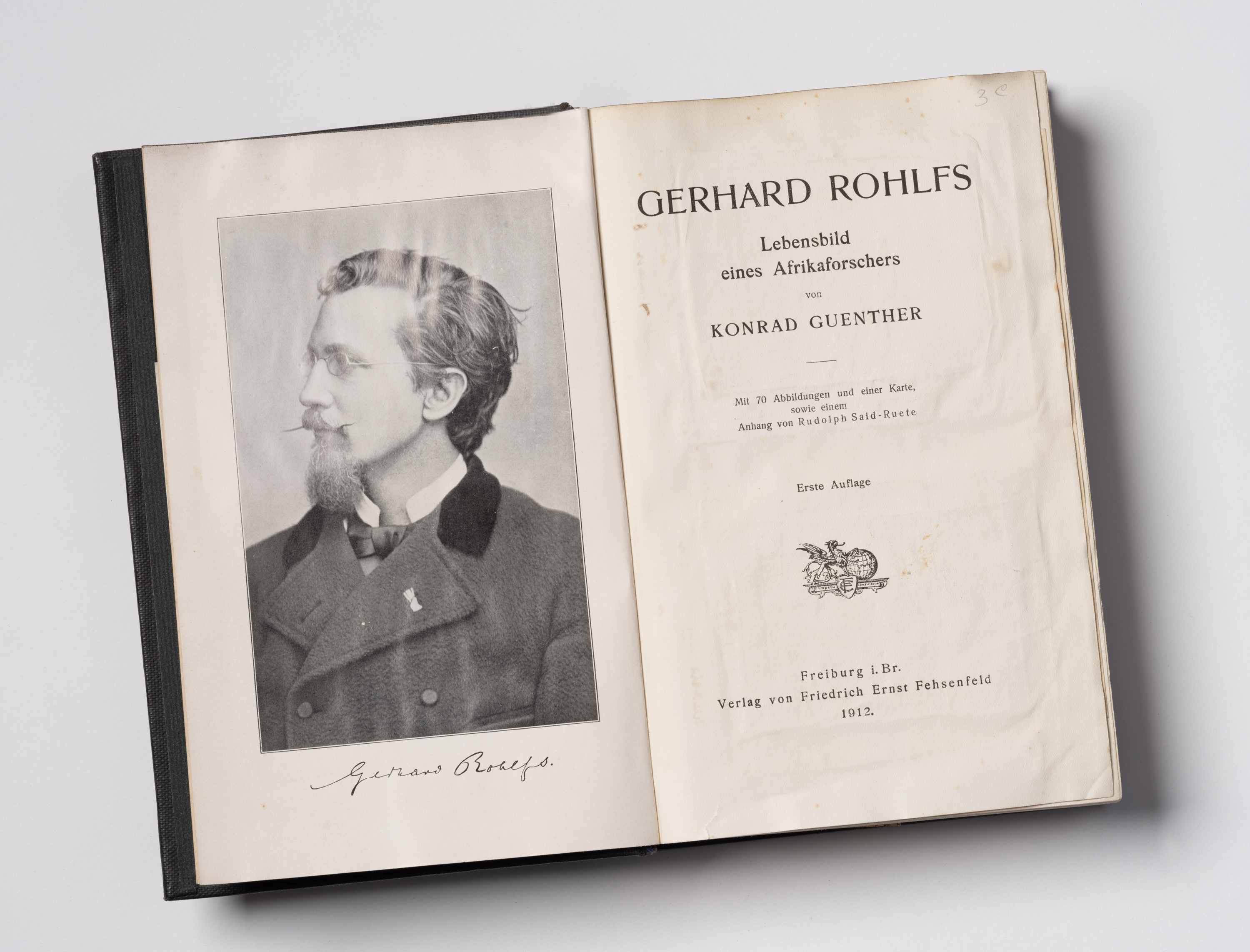
Portrait in Gerhard Rohlfs, Lebensbild eines Afrikaforschers

In 1885, when the rivalry between the British and Germans in East Africa was very keen, Otto von Bismarck appointed Rohlfs consul at Zanzibar, which Bismarck desired to secure for Germany. Rohlfs, untrained in diplomacy, was no match for John Kirk, the British agent, and he was soon recalled. He did not visit Africa again.

Rohlfs died at Rüngsdorf, near Bonn.

== Bibliography ==
- Rohlfs, G.F. (1868), Reise durch Marokko, Übersteigung des großen Atlas, Exploration der Oasen von Tafilet, Tuat und Tidikelt und Reise durch die große Wüste über Rhadames nach Tripoli, Bremen: J. Kühtmann.
- Rohlfs, G.F. (1874), Adventures in Morocco and journeys through the oases of Draa and Tafilet, London: S. Low, Marston, Low, & Searle.
- Rohlfs, G.F. (1870), Land und Volk in Afrika: Berichte aus den Jahren 1865-1870, Bremen: J. Kühtmann.
- Von Tripolis nach Alexandria (1871)
- Quer durch Afrika (1874–75)
- Beiträge zur Entdeckung und Erforschung Afrikas (1876)
- Reise von Tripolis nach der Oase Kufra (1881)
- Quid Novi ex Africa (1886)
