= Kufra Airport =

Airport serving Al Jawf, Libya

- IATA: AKF; ICAO: HLKF

Summary
- Airport type: Public
- Operator: Civil Aviation and Meteorology Bureau
- Serves: Al Jawf, Libya
- Elevation AMSL: 1,367 ft (417 m)
- Coordinates: 24°10′40″N 23°18′50″E

Map
- Location of the airport in Libya

Runways
| Direction | Length | | Surface |
| Direction | m | ft | Surface |
|---|---|---|---|
| 02L/20R | 3,660 | 12,008 | Asphalt |
| 02R/20L | | | Closed |
- Sources: WAD GCM

Kufra Airport (IATA: AKF, ICAO: HLKF) is an airport serving Al Jawf, capital of the Kufra District in southeastern Libya. The airport is just east of the city.

== History ==
Kufra Airport began as Buma Airfield, built in the 1930s as a minor facility by the Italians. In early World War II, it provided an air link to Italian East Africa (Ethiopia, Eritrea, and Italian Somaliland). It was captured by Free French units under General Leclerc on 1 March 1941 along with Kufra Oasis.

Libyan Airlines operated a twice-weekly service from Benghazi with Boeing 727-200 for at least ten years prior to its suspension in 2004. For a couple of years leading up to the revolution Tibesti Airlines (later renamed Air Libya) operated a twice-weekly Benghasi – Kufra – Khartum service with a leased British Aerospace 146 aircraft. Air Libya also operated an intermittent weekly direct flight to Tripoli with a Boeing 727-200.

In July 2013, Libyan Airlines re-launched the Benghazi service that was suspended nine years earlier. During the same month a 2010 contract with Italian company Salini Costruttori to upgrade the airport's runway and taxiways (put on hold due to the 2011 civil war) was reactivated, with the works slated to take 20 months.

Since the start of the Sudanese civil war in 2023, Kufra Airport has served as a major supply hub operated by the United Arab Emirates to support Rapid Support Forces. In January 2026, the Libyan National Army announced a one-month closure of the airport for maintenance. The decision came amid a rift in relations between Saudi Arabia and the United Arab Emirates.

== Airlines and destinations ==
| Airlines | Destinations |
|---|---|
| Afriqiyah Airways | Benghazi, Tripoli–Mitiga |
| Libyan Airlines | Benghazi, Tripoli–Mitiga |

== Accidents and incidents ==
In a tragedy at Kufra, in April 1942 a detachment of Squadron 16 of the South African Air Force with three Bristol Blenheim Mk. IV aircraft was ordered to Kufra under the command of Major J.L.V. de Wet to strengthen the garrison air defences. On the morning of 4 May 1942 the three aircraft took off on a familiarization mission. They became lost and landed about 150 kilometres northeast of Kufra. A sandstorm thwarted ground and air search parties, and by the time the lost aircraft were located on 11 May only one of the total 12-man crew was alive.

On 26 August 2008, a hijacked Sudanese Boeing 737 landed at Kufra Airport after having departed at Nyala Airport, Darfur, with destination Khartoum. Earlier, Egyptian authorities had refused the plane to land in their national capital, Cairo.

== See also ==
- Transport in Libya
- List of airports in Libya
