= Louis Dio =

French army general (1908–1994)

- Born: Louis Dio; 14 October 1908; Vannes, France
- Died: 15 June 1994 (aged 85); Toulon, France
- Military career
- Allegiance: France
- Branch: Troupes coloniales
- Service years: 1926–1969
- Rank: Général d'armée
- Commands: Régiment de marche du Tchad; French 2nd Armored Division; French Protectorate of Tunisia (Territories of Tunisian South); Ground Forces of Cambodia; French Forces in French Equatorial Africa
- Conflicts: World War II
- Awards: Grand-croix de la Légion d'honneur Compagnon de la Libération; Croix de guerre 1939-1945
- Other work: Free French Forces; Liberation of Paris; Liberation of Strasbourg

Louis Dio (14 October 1908, in Vannes – 15 June 1994, in Toulon), was a French général d'armée.

== Biography ==
Louis Dio was born in Vannes in Morbihan, France, on 14 October 1908. His father, a career officer, committed suicide in August 1914. After studying at the Collège Jules Simon between 1914 and 1925, he was accepted at age 18 at the École spéciale militaire de Saint-Cyr.

Upon graduating from the military academy and commissioning as an officer in 1928, Second Lieutenant Dio was assigned to the 18th Régiment de Tirailleurs Sénégalais (RTS) based in southern Tunisia. The young Breton officer promptly adapted to and embraced the austere desert lifestyle of the Tirailleurs. He perfected his knowledge of Arabic; the study he had undertaken at Saint-Cyr, and was also introduced to local African dialects. He chose to serve with the French Camel-mounted Troops (Méharistes), whose distinctive military culture was characterized by a nomadic existence to remain in permanent contact with the local populations. He immersed himself completely in this lifestyle, as evidenced, for example, by the customary, "beautiful tattoos that went down to the fingers of his hands” he had drawn on his arms.

Before the Second World War, apart from two brief stays in mainland France, he served three times in the Sahara's most desolate and underdeveloped areas. From 1929 to 1933, he was posted north of Timbuktu in Arwan, French Sudan (present-day Mali). In 1933, he took command of the Groupe Nomade d’Arouan while still a lieutenant. He was cited for having successfully fought against looters at El Ksaib in 1932.

Promoted to captain, he served from 1934 to 1937 in the Nema region, in the south-east of Mauritania. He commanded the Groupe Nomade du Hodh. In June 1935, he led a reconnaissance of more than 2,000 kilometers in inhospitable and previously unexplored areas of Nema.

In 1938, he was assigned to northern Chad, where he took command of the Groupe Nomade du Tibesti. Conversant in their language, he immersed himself in the local society and befriended the traditional chiefs. He became a confidant to Bey Ahmed, the spiritual leader of the Senoussis, and to the "Alifa" of Mao, who had authority over the whole Kanem region. He maintained very close relations with them, and, in an unusual and unprecedented arrangement for a Roman Catholic officer of the French army, was authorized to sign "canouns"(legally binding judgments) rendered within the framework of Muslim civil law.

When the war broke out, he was tasked with organizing a detachment of the Senegalese Infantry Regiment of Chad (Régiment de Tirailleurs Sénégalais du Tchad, RTST), destined to be sent as reinforcements to mainland France. Dio was taken unaware by the armistice of June 1940, which was concluded while he was awaiting the transport which was to repatriate him to France in Douala, Cameroon.

On August 27, 1940, he was the first French officer to join Colonel Leclerc, who had been sent from London by De Gaulle to rally the troops of the French Colonial Empire. With the unit's active participation commanded by Captain Dio, Leclerc would seize Douala and Yaoundé. With Gabon not willing to submit to Free France, Dio was put in charge of the column, which departed from Cameroon and seized Mitzic, then Lambaréné, on November 5, 1940.

Appointed major at the end of 1940, he was called to Chad by Leclerc. His comprehensive knowledge of the human and geographical environment of the north of this country, which was in contact with the forces of the Axis, was invaluable to Leclerc. Together, they took the Italian fort at Kufra in Southern Libya on March 1, 1941. This was the first combat victory for the French army in World War II. Leclerc swore his famous "Kufra oath" there after the Italian defeat, pledging to continue the fight until the Tricolor again flew over Strasbourg Cathedral. During the fighting, Major Dio was seriously injured while carrying out a night grenade assault on an Italian position. He was subsequently made a Companion of the Liberation by the head of Free France (decree of 7.12.1941).

In 1942, he commanded the main unit of the Leclerc Column in the Fezzan, and gave the following instruction to his European troops: "The natives of Fezzan are our future citizens... the natives will be respected in their person and their property". At the beginning of 1943, with "Force L", he was the first to enter Tripoli alongside British troops(January 26, 1943).

In the summer of 1943, then a colonel, he took command of the Chadian Infantry (Marching) Regiment (Régiment de Marche du Tchad, RMT), which had recently been established and organized in Morocco by General Leclerc. In August 1944, he landed with this unit in Normandy and participated in the liberation of France within the 2nd (French) Armored Division, as commander of the Tactical Group Dio (Groupe Tactique Dio, GTD). He entered Paris on August 25, 1944, and continued pursuing the eastward offensive into Lorraine and Alsace. When he liberated Strasbourg on November 23, 1944, Leclerc said to him, "This is it, old Dio. Now we can both croak". The Tactical Group Dio ended the war in Berchtesgaden, where, in early May 1945, its units were part of the conquest of Hitler's Eagle's Nest.

In June 1945, faithful among the faithful, General Leclerc personally chose Colonel Louis Dio to succeed him as commander of the 2nd (French) Armored Division. In October of the same year, at age 37, he became the youngest brigadier general in the French army.

From 1946 to 1950, he commanded French forces in the territories of southern Tunisia, before serving in the Far East from 1950 to 1952 as commander of the land forces of Cambodia.

Promoted to major general in 1955, he assumed command of the armed forces of the defense zone of French Equatorial Africa and Cameroon. He was opposed to the then-emerging operational doctrine of "revolutionary war" espoused by many high-ranking French army officers because of the "psychological methods" it incorporated. He believed such methods were neither relevant nor likely to successfully confront "individuals with reflexes conditioned by a feudal or tribal sense of political and social relations and an innate respect for absolute authority". Dio, who had learned to love and respect the African peoples by sharing their lives during his years as méhariste, believed that this new doctrine of counter-revolutionary warfare, derived from the French experience of war in Indochina, did not apply to Africans still steeped in their ancient traditions.

Considered to be the "conscience of the Colonial corps", he was appointed in 1961 as chief of the General Staff of the Land Forces Stationed Overseas, a temporary organization created to undertake the military planning needed in the era of the independence of the new African states. The main heads of state of French-speaking Africa relied on consultations with General Dio for assistance and support in establishing their new armed forces.

From 1962 to 1969, his military responsibilities became less burdensome, and he agreed to assume the presidency of the Association of Free French at the request of General de Gaulle. On July 6, 1962, he gave the eulogy for General Edgard de Larminat at his funeral.

In 1965, he was promoted to the rank of general of the army and assumed duties as Inspector General of the Army.

General Louis Dio, having reached the statutory age limit for military service, was placed on the retired list of the cadre of general officers in 1969 and thereupon retired to Toulon. He led a simple and discreet life, never looking back on his past and seeking neither honors nor glory, as evidenced by his will, in which he specified: "I essentially want to be buried like an anonymous soldier, which I have never ceased being throughout my life in the deepest recesses of my heart".

He died in 1994 and was buried in private, according to his wishes, in the Colonial officers' section of Toulon cemetery, where he rests in perpetuity with his brothers in arms.

On July 1, 2010, the RMT (régiment de marche du Tchad), of which he had been the first commander, occupied the garrison at Colmar-Meyenheim Air Base 132, which was renamed Quartier Colonel Dio in his honor.

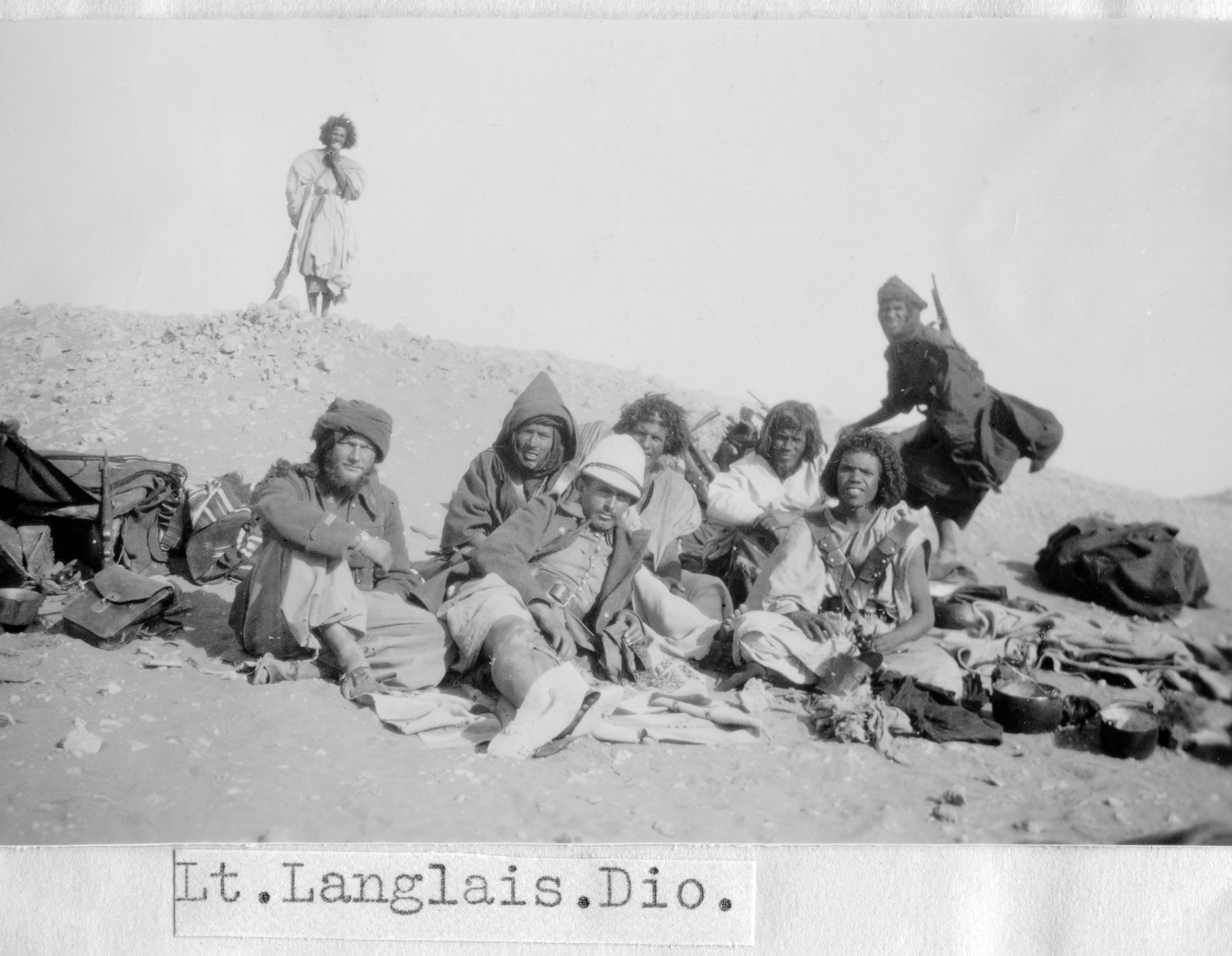
Lieutenant Dio (in the center with helmet) and Langlais with Goumiers (indigenous soldiers) of the Nomadic Group of Arouan. November 1932, Colonel Jean-Pierre Durand-Gasselin Collection.

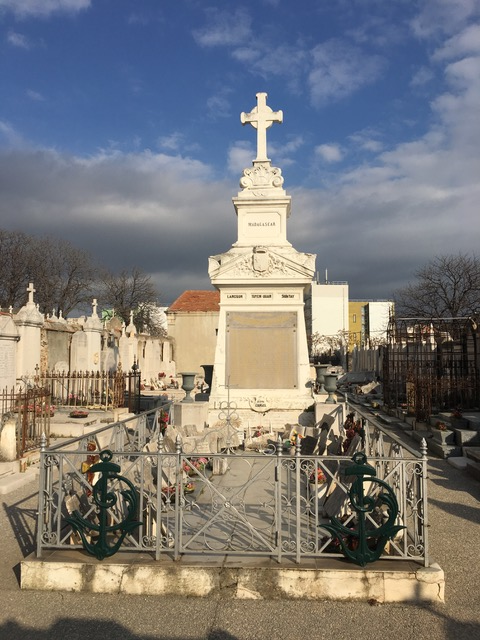
General Dio was buried in June 1994 at the Carré des officiers coloniaux in Toulon. Private collection.
