= Saint-Martin-de-Varreville =

- Commune
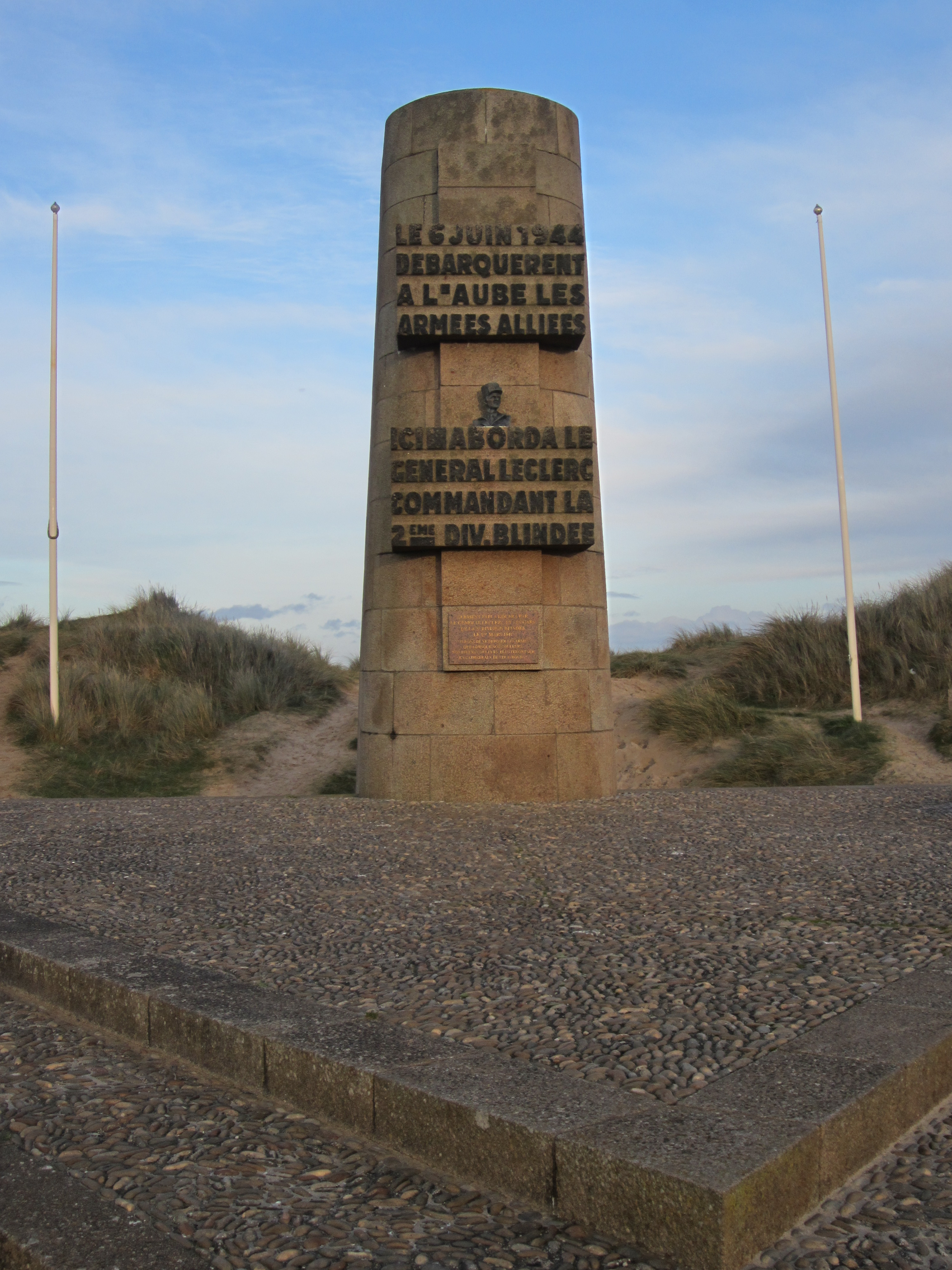
- The Leclerc monument
- Location of Saint-Martin-de-Varreville
- Location within France Location within Normandy
- Coordinates: 49°25′38″N 1°14′09″W
- Country: France
- Region: Normandy
- Department: Manche
- Arrondissement: Cherbourg
- Canton: Carentan-les-Marais

Government
  - Mayor (2020–2026): Ghyslène Lebarbenchon
- Area^{1}: 8.36 km^{2} (3.23 sq mi)
- Elevation: 24 m (79 ft)
- Population (2023): 173
  - Density: 20.7/km^{2} (53.6/sq mi)
- Time zone: UTC+01:00 (CET)
  - Summer (DST): UTC+02:00 (CEST)
- INSEE/Postal code: 50517 /50480
- ^{1} French Land Register data, which excludes lakes, ponds, glaciers > 1 km^{2} (0.386 sq mi or 247 acres) and river estuaries.

Saint-Martin-de-Varreville (French pronunciation: [sɛ̃ maʁtɛ̃ də vaʁvil]) is a commune in the Manche department in Normandy in north-western France.

== See also ==
- Communes of the Manche department
