= Capture of Kufra =

Combat action during the Western Desert Campaign of the Second World War

- Part of Operation Compass, during the Second World War
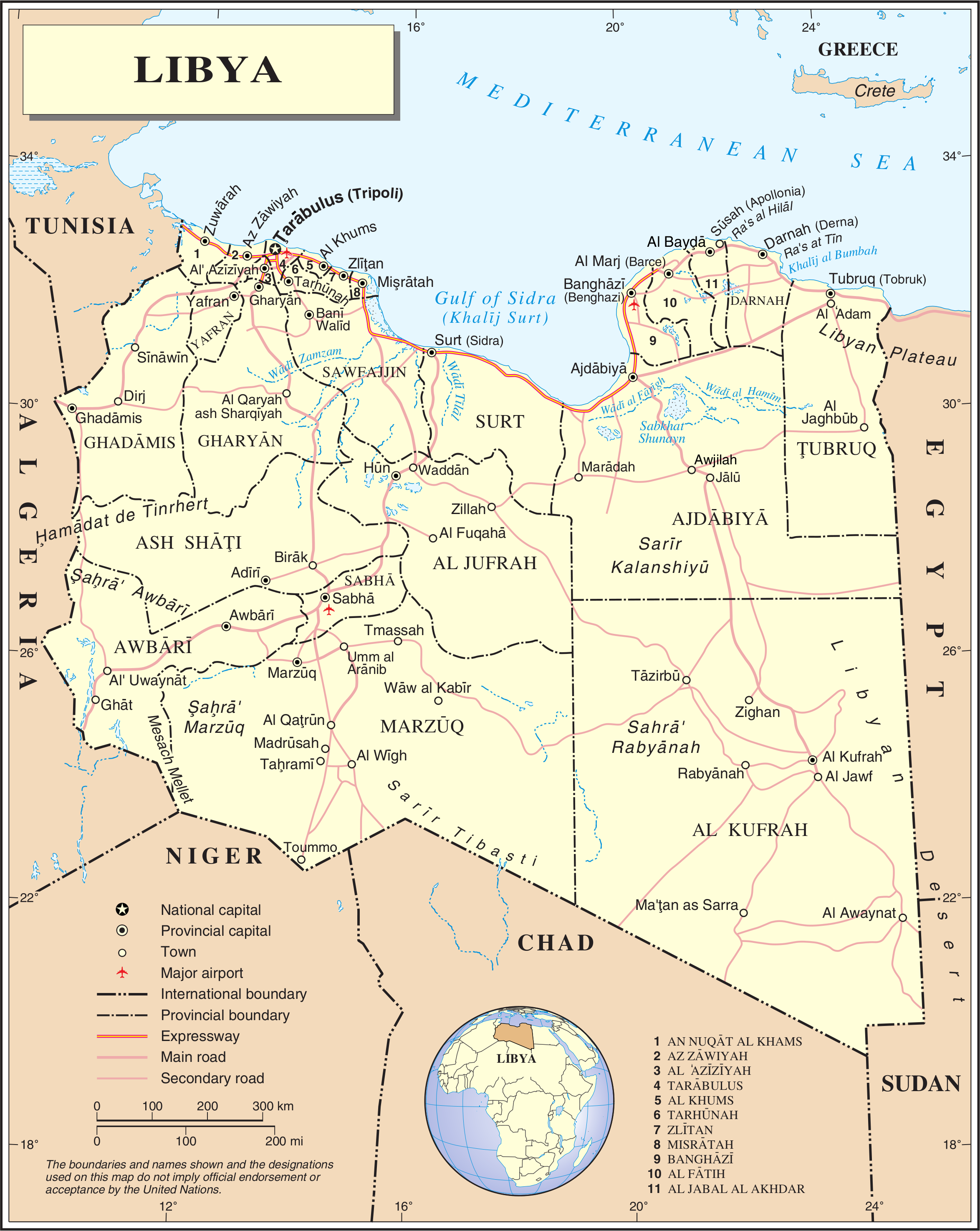
- UN map of Libya, Kufra (now Al Kufrah) to the south-east
Date	31 January – 1 March 1941 (1 month and 1 day)
Location	Kufra, Libya 24°11′N 23°17′E
Result	Allied victory

Belligerents
Free France; United Kingdom	Italy: Libya

Commanders and leaders
(Free France) Philippe Leclerc; (United Kingdom) Pat Clayton	(Kingdom of Italy) Capt. Colonna

Strength
1 FFF Battalion (350 men); 1 LRDG (76 men); 60 trucks	2 Italian Askari Company (310 men); 1 Auto-Saharan Company (120 men); 20 trucks 4 aircraft

Casualties and losses
4 killed 21 wounded	3 killed 4 wounded 282 captured 3 aircraft destroyed

The Capture of Kufra (French: Prise de Koufra, Italian: Cufra) was part of the Allied Western Desert Campaign during the Second World War. Kufra is a group of oases in the Kufra District of south-eastern Cyrenaica in the Libyan Desert. In 1940, it was part of the colony of Italian Libya Libia Italiana, which was part of Africa Settentrionale Italiana (ASI), which had been established in 1934. With some early assistance from the British Long Range Desert Group, Kufra was besieged from 31 January to 1 March 1941 by Free French forces from French Equatorial Africa which forced the surrender of the Italian and Libyan garrison.

== The Oath ==
On 1 March, General Leclerc and his men swore the following oath,

Jurez de ne déposer les armes, que le jour où nos couleurs, nos belles couleurs, flotteront sur la Cathédrale de Strasbourg.

Swear to not lay down arms, until the day when our colours, our beautiful colours, fly over Strasbourg Cathedral.

The oath was fulfilled when, on 23 November 1944, the 2nd Armoured Division, led by Leclerc, liberated the city of Strasbourg. A Spahi from Louis Dio's 5th Squadron was responsible for raising the Free French flag upon the Cathedral.
