= Kufra =

Kufra الكفرة Cufra
- Location in Libya
- Coordinates: 24°11′N 23°17′E
- Country: Libya
- Region: Cyrenaica
- District: Kufra
- Time zone: UTC +2
- License Plate Code: 20

Kufra (/ˈkuːfrə/) is a basin and oasis group in the Kufra District of southeastern Cyrenaica in Libya. At the end of the 19th century, Kufra became the centre and holy place of the Senussi order. It also played a minor role in the Western Desert Campaign of World War II.

It is located in a particularly isolated area, not only because it is in the middle of the Sahara Desert but also because it is surrounded on three sides by depressions which make it dominate the passage of the east-west land traffic across the desert. For the colonial Italians, it was also important as a station on the north-south air route to Italian East Africa. These factors, along with Kufra's dominance of the southeastern Cyrenaica region of Libya, highlight the strategic importance of the oasis and why it was a point of conflict during World War II.

== Etymology ==
The folk etymology associates the word "Kufra" as coming from the Arabic word kafir (كافر), meaning "disbeliever" or "infidel". The term kafir originates from the Arabic root K-F-R, which means "to cover" or "to conceal". In Islamic theology, it refers to someone who denies or conceals the truth of Islam, with reference to the Toubou people native to the region.

The association of the term Kufra stems from the early 19th-century context, marked by Arab-initiated tribal conflict and territorial expansion in southern Cyrenaica. Arab tribes—primarily the Zuwayya and Jawabis—sought to assert control over the region’s most fertile oases, a core area of Toubou settlement.

Contemporary accounts, such as those by the German explorer Friedrich Hornemann (1772–1801), who crossed the Libyan Desert in 1798, document the early invasions into Toubou-controlled territory. Hornemann refers to expeditions launched from Benghazi and Awjila, which was a repeated pattern of invasions towards the area he identified as Febabo—modern-day Kufra (also known as al-Jawf). The first Arab invasions, carried out by the Jawazi tribes from northern Cyrenaica in the late 18th and early 19th centuries, were met with local resistance and ultimately repelled.

A pivotal moment occurred in 1808, during the rule of Yusuf Karamanli, Pasha of Tripoli. After facing strong local resistance, Arab tribes sought military aid from the Ottoman authorities. In response, they were supplied with firearms and troops, leading to the occupation of the Kufra region—one of the Toubou's strongholds—by the Zuwayya and their allies. These military campaigns reportedly resulted in significant casualties among the native Toubou (Goran) and Zaghawa populations and many were forced migrate from the region. However, Kufra never fully came under the dominion of either the Arabs or the Ottomans. During this period, Arab forces referred to the Toubou as kuffar (the plural of kafir, meaning "disbelievers"), a term employed in military rhetoric and campaign slogans. Thus, it became associated with the region itself, ultimately giving rise to the toponym Kufra.

The broader region came to be known as Kufra, with al-Jawf frequently referred to by the same name, serving as both its administrative and geographic center. Historically, southern Cyrenaica was known in prehistoric times for its fertility and verdant landscape. In the Toubou language, it was called Tazer, meaning "greenland", a term also applied specifically to al-Jawf (Kufra). Over time, the toponym Febabo came into use for the al-Jawf oasis, meaning "the one with the grand pits" in the Toubou language.

The region was also referenced by Friedrich Gerhard Rohlfs (1831–1896) in 1879, who referred to the site as Kebabo. Rohlfs speculated that Hornemann had misspelled the name and incorrectly assumed it was derived from the Arabic Kufra. This was inaccurate. The name Febabo appears in several historical cartographic records as Kebabo, which is also incorrect. However, it has been misspelled even by the native scholars, despite its accurate meaning having been properly explained—leading to the continued use of Kebabo instead of the original Febabo.

Rohlfs further observed that the area was part of the ancient ancestral seat of the Garamantes. He noted, however, that he did not have the opportunity to consult directly with Toubou regarding the deeper historical context of the region. Furthermore, he reported that the Zuwayya were reluctant to disclose information about the earlier history of the Toubou in Kufra and kept it as very secretive. Because he did not ask the Toubou, he did not know the meaning of Febabo, despite it being a relatively simple and straightforward word. According to local accounts, the Zuwayya destroyed ancient Toubou sites in an attempt to erase their historical presence from the region—an action that further corresponds with Rohlfs' observations.

Similarly, Hornemann recorded accounts from the people of Awjila—primarily Berbers—who described Febabou (Kufra) as a ten-day journey from their settlement. These are the same people, from the same place who are the Nasamones, who clearly provided geographic descriptions and oral accounts to the Greek historian Herodotus. (c. 484–425 BCE), offering early insights into the region's geography, which has led many travelers to become confused. Concerning the Garamantes, Herodotus' descriptions are contradictory, raising critical questions about the reliability of his ethnographic accounts. These inconsistencies in Herodotus's portrayal of the Garamantes challenge the accuracy of his claims and suggest a need for further investigation into the region's true historical context.

The term Garama–ntes, recorded by Herodotus, has meaning and it is deep rooted in Toubou which means literally "the sons of the speakers of the Ga language", with Ga being as a unifying designation for the Toubou language (Dazaga-Tedaga). The Toubou people continue to refer to themselves as Ga people and to their language as Ga, reflecting a longstanding linguistic and cultural identity that underscores their cohesion as a single people. The Toubou are also known as Goran, a name that is still in use today particularly in Sudan. In fact, these names are used interchangeably in the Tubu world, just like the ancient names Tehenu and Temehu, which the ancient Egyptians used to refer to the same people. It is attributed to them through their ancestors, the Garamantes—Garama–nte—Herodotus derived their name from their city of Garama, (also known as Germa but locally pronounced as Jarma). Over time, the term was distorted by Arabic speakers, who altered the original -ma ending to -an. In the Toubou language, ma means "sons". The Garamantes' forebears are the Tehenu and Temehu, the ancient Libyan groups mentioned in early Egyptian records. In the Toubou language, the names Tehenu and Temehu literally mean "people of the southern land" and "people of the eastern land", respectively. The correct pronunciation of Tehenu as Tuhunu is derived from Tu meaning "land" and hunu derived from anou meaning "south", while Temehu as Tumuhu combines Tu meaning "land" and muhu meaning "east". Wherever the Toubou (Goran) originated, the Zaghawa also came from the same place. Since the dawn of history, people have lived in groups, and the Zaghawa lived alongside the Toubou, sharing many common origins. The name Toubou is constructed similarly to that of their ancestors, with Tu meaning "land" and Bu meaning "grand", "great", or simply "big". Together, the name means "Grand Land", referring to their entire homeland that includes Libya, Chad, Sudan, Niger and beyond—essentially meaning "people of the great land" or "people of the grand homeland". The history of Black people in North Africa from Egypt to Morocco has frequently been manipulated. Similarly to ancient Egypt, the histories of Black people in Libya have been systematically distorted, marginalized, or erased—especially the history of the Toubou people and their ancestors. Their heritage has often been misrepresented by Western writers, and the Barbarians have also exploited biased narratives around the identities of the Tehenu (Temehu) and Garamantes.

== Geography ==
Kufra is an elliptic shaped basin, oriented northeast-southwest. The major axis is 50 km (31 mi), the minor 20 km (12 mi) long. It is bordered by hills which are at most 100 m high. The soil consists of red marl or sand and in the lowest parts there are salt lakes or dried salines. In the basin lie the following oases:

- Al Jawf ("Center"), the largest, situated at the northeast end of the basin, 5 km (3.1 mi) long and 2–3 km (1.2–1.9 mi) wide. It is rich with palms and gardens.
- Buma and Buema, both small and situated to the east of Al Jawf. Gerhard Rohlfs set his camp north of Buema, and since then the locality is known as "Garet-en-Nasrani" ("Field of the Christian" in Arabic). Kufra Airport is located in Buma.
- Ez-Zurgh, situated 4 km (2.5 mi) to the south of Al Jawf. It consists of a line of Palm trees. Until the Italian occupation it was inhabited only by slaves.
- Et-Tleilíb and Et-Talláb, both situated to the southwest of Al Jawf. The latter is the farthest from Al Jawf, lying 20 km (12 mi) away.

On the north edge of the basin, there is the village of El Tag, which means crown in Arabic, which does not contain an oasis. It was founded by Sayyid Muhammad al-Mahdi as-Senussi, the son of the founder of the Senussi order, when he moved to Kufra and is considered the holy place of Senussi.

=== Climate ===
Due to its location in the Libyan Desert, Kufra has a hot desert climate (Köppen BWh), with mild winters, very hot summers, a high diurnal temperature variation and almost no precipitation. The average annual mean temperature is 23.0 °C (73.4 °F), the average annual high temperature is 31.1 °C (88.0 °F) and the average annual low temperature is 15.0 °C (59.0 °F). June, July and August are the hottest months, having mean temperatures of 30.5 °C (86.9 °F), average high temperatures around 38.0 °C (100.4 °F) or higher and average lows around 23.0 °C (73.4 °F). January is the coldest month, with the lowest average high at 21.0 °C (69.8 °F), lowest mean at 13.0 °C (55.4 °F) and lowest average low at 5.0 °C (41.0 °F).

Kufra receives only 1 millimetre (0.039 in) of rain annually, making it one of the driest locations in the world. Humidity is lower in summer than in winter, with the summer months having a humidity of just 23% and December having a humidity of 48%. Kufra receives abundant amounts of sunshine, with 3689 hours of sunshine annually (84% of possible sunshine), with the most sunshine in summer and the least in winter. July receives the most sunshine of any month with 384 hours on average, while February and December receive the least with 262 hours and 266 hours respectively.

Climate data for Kufra, Libya (Altitude: 435 m or 1,427 ft)
Month	Jan	Feb	Mar	Apr	May	Jun	Jul	Aug	Sep	Oct	Nov	Dec	Year
Mean daily maximum °C (°F)	21.0 (69.8)	23.0 (73.4)	28.0 (82.4)	33.0 (91.4)	37.0 (98.6)	39.0 (102.2)	38.0 (100.4)	38.0 (100.4)	35.0 (95.0)	32.0 (89.6)	27.0 (80.6)	22.0 (71.6)	31.1 (88.0)
Daily mean °C (°F)	13.0 (55.4)	15.0 (59.0)	19.5 (67.1)	24.0 (75.2)	28.5 (83.3)	30.5 (86.9)	30.5 (86.9)	30.5 (86.9)	27.5 (81.5)	24.5 (76.1)	19.0 (66.2)	14.0 (57.2)	23.0 (73.5)
Mean daily minimum °C (°F)	5.0 (41.0)	7.0 (44.6)	11.0 (51.8)	15.0 (59.0)	20.0 (68.0)	22.0 (71.6)	23.0 (73.4)	23.0 (73.4)	20.0 (68.0)	17.0 (62.6)	11.0 (51.8)	6.0 (42.8)	15.0 (59.0)
Average rainfall mm (inches)	0 (0)	0 (0)	0 (0)	0 (0)	0 (0)	0 (0)	0 (0)	1 (0.0)	0 (0)	0 (0)	0 (0)	0 (0)	1 (0.0)
Average rainy days	0	0	0	0	0	0	0	0	0	0	0	0	0
Average relative humidity (%)	45	38	33	28	24	23	23	23	27	31	42	48	32
Mean monthly sunshine hours	279	262	294	286	306	342	384	374	301	298	292	266	3,689
Percentage possible sunshine	84	83	80	76	75	85	93	94	85	84	90	82	84
Source: Climatemps.com

== History ==
=== Early history ===
Claudius Ptolemy wrote that around 90 AD Julius Maternus (or Matiernus) carried out a mainly commercial expedition. From the Sirte gulf he reached the Oasis of Cufra and the Oasis of Archei, then arrived, after 4 months travelling with the king of the Garamantes, to the river Bahr Salamat and Bahr Aouk, near modern-day Central African Republic in a region then called Agisymba.

In 1154 al-Idrisi described a place identified by Lewicki as the oasis of Kufra. Al-Idrisi writes that the place was once flourishing and peopled, but was by that point in ruin, its wells dry, its herds returned to the wild. In the late 15th century, Leo Africanus reported an oasis in the land of the Berdoa, visited by a caravan coming from Awjila. It is possible that this oasis was identical with either the Al Jawf (Kufra) or the Tazirbu oasis, and on early modern maps, the Al Kufra region was often labelled as Berdoa based on this report. Berdoa possibly corresponded to the Toubou, a Nilo-Saharan speaking tribal people indigenous to the region.

=== Early Western contact and the Senussi ===
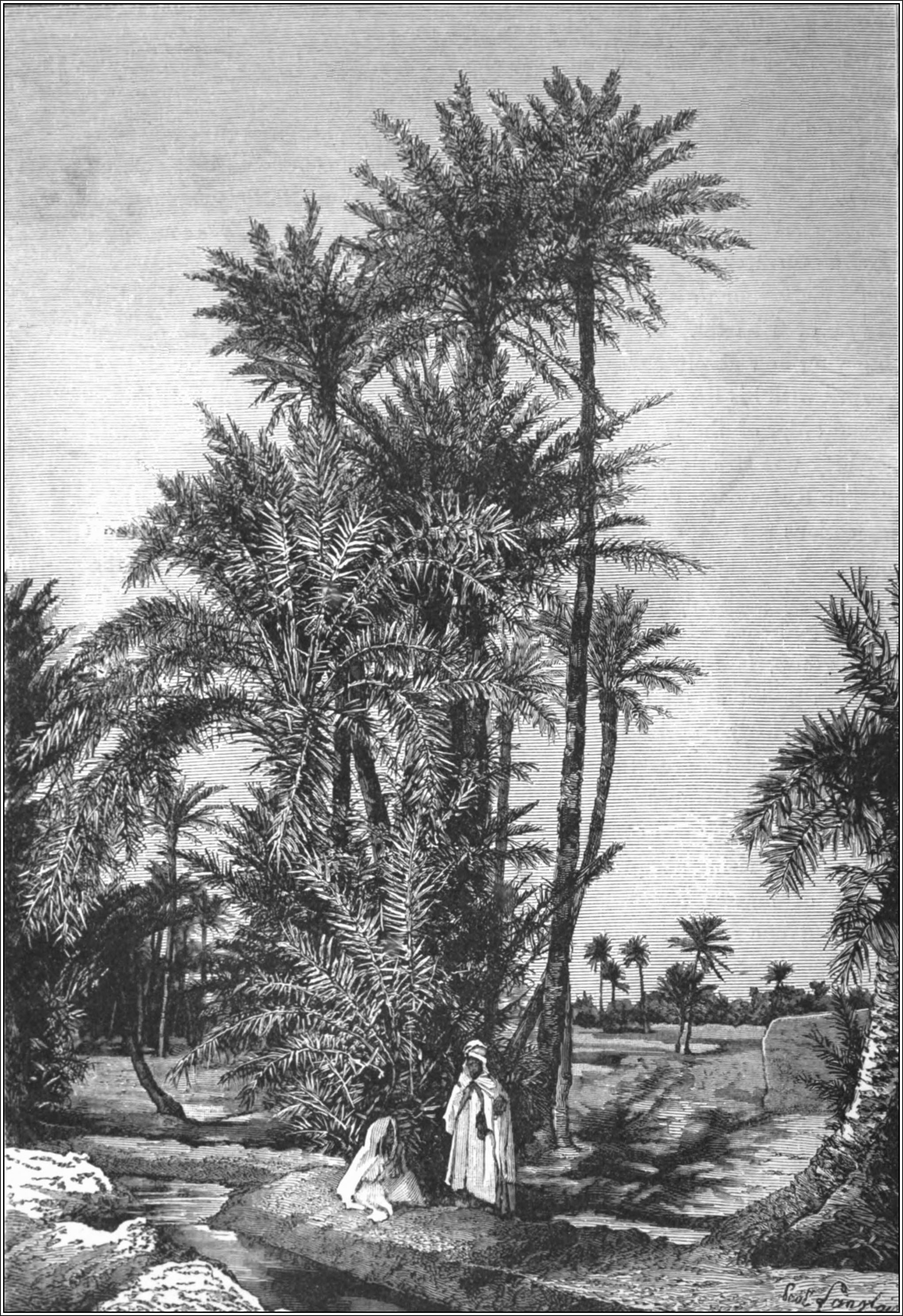
The Kufra oasis in 1891

The territory of Kufra was first explored by Westerners beginning with the 1873/74 expedition by German Gerhard Rohlfs. Rohlfs reportedly first reached the oasis from the north in 1879.

Kufra was an important trade and travelling route for various nomadic desert people. In 1895 seeking greater independence the Senussi relocated from Jaghbub, making the oasis their main centre. However, the Ottoman Sultan Abdulhamid II twice sent his aide-de-camp Azmzade Sadik El Mueyyed to meet Sheikh Senussi to cultivate positive relations and counter the West European scramble for Africa (see Azmzade 2021). After that, Westerners could no longer visit it until the First World War, when several soldiers of the Entente were held prisoner there.

In 1929, the Sanusi center of Kufra in the Sahara was pointed out as a center of the Trans-Saharan slave trade. In 1931, during the campaign of Cyrenaica, General Rodolfo Graziani easily conquered Kufra, considered a strategic region, leading about 3,000 soldiers from infantry and artillery, supported by about twenty bombers.

Many refugees fled the Italian conquest eastwards via Uweinat into Egypt. The British explorer Pat Clayton, engaged in mapping areas of previously unmapped desert, encountered the Kufra refugees when running triangulation from Wadi Halfa to Uweinat, and helped save many from death in the arid desert.

=== Italian takeover of Kufra ===
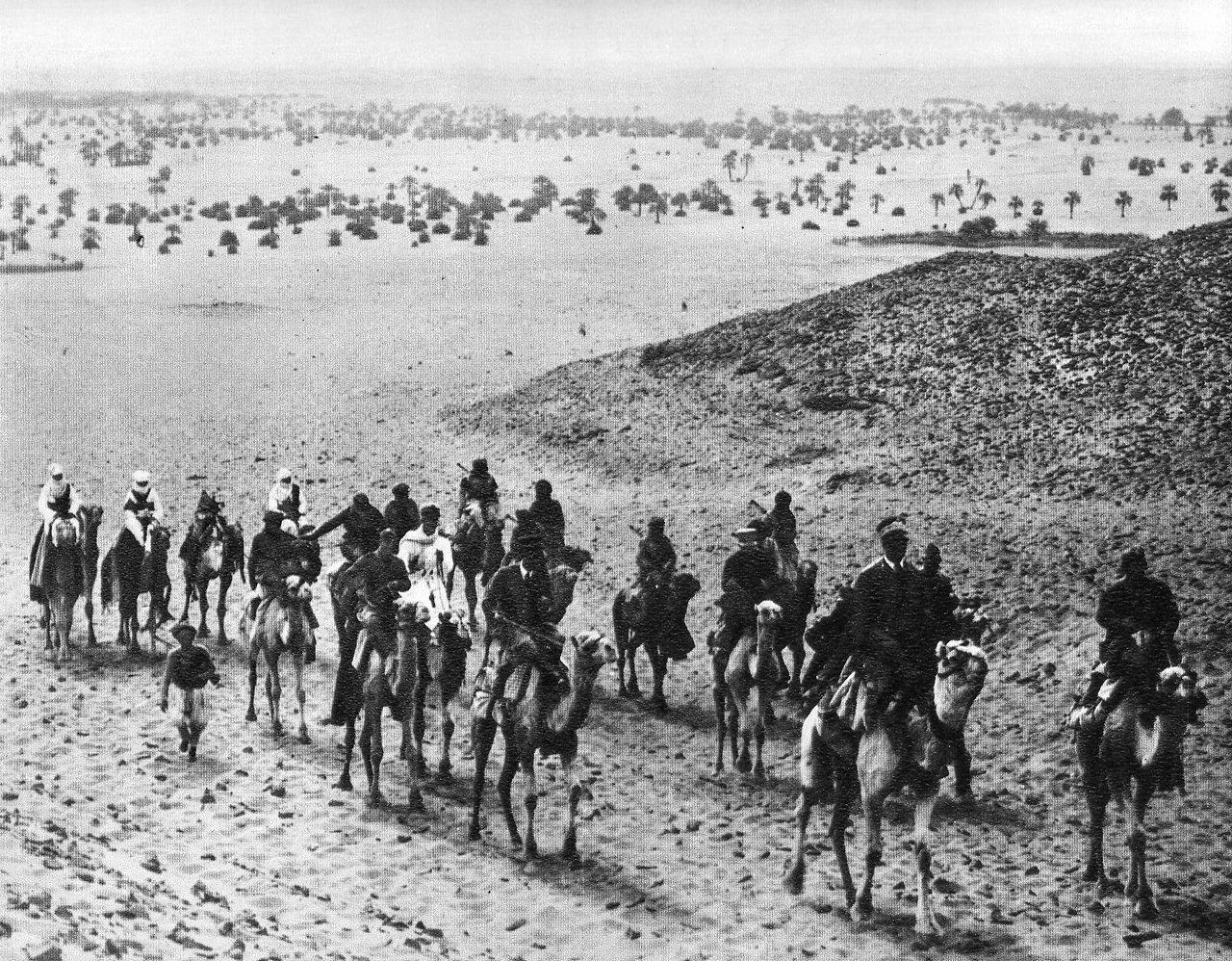
Rodolfo Graziani and Amedeo D'Aosta's troops in Kufra, 1931

The Frankfurter Zeitung reporter and author Muhammad Asad interviewed a man from Kufra after its seizure by the Italians in his book The Road to Mecca. According to Asad's source, the Italians attacked from three sides, with armored cars, artillery, and aircraft. The defenders, a few hundred men with only small arms unable to penetrate the Italian armor, defended the place house-to-house but were overwhelmed. The Italians (and their Eritrean auxiliaries) then raped the women, tore up a Koran and cast it on the ground, cut down the palm trees, burnt Sayyid Ahmad's library, and took some of the elders and scholars and hurled them to their death from airplanes.

=== Italian rule and World War II ===
In the following years the Italians built an airfield (now Kufra Airport) in Buma oasis and a fort in El Tag, which dominated the area.

Buma airport was equipped with a radio-centre for flight assistance and was often used as a stop for routes toward Asmara and Italian East Africa. The fort was also used as a radio post to guide in Italian aircraft as well as to maintain communication with Italian East Africa.

Kufra grew in importance when the Second World War started and, after the Suez Canal was closed to Italian shipping, connections with Italian East Africa became mainly aerial, using Kufra and its strategic location.

Kufra, due to its key role for the Italian Royal Army, soon became a target for the Allies, with Free France and British desert troops beginning a long battle for its conquest. On 31 January 1941 Pat Clayton, an explorer recruited by British Intelligence, was captured by the Italian Auto-Saharan Company near Jebel Sherif, when leading "T" Patrol in reconnaissance of the planned attack on Kufra.

The Free French from Chad, with General Leclerc leading a combined force of Free French and Chadian native troops, attacked and took Kufra in the Battle of Kufra.

In later stages of the Western Desert Campaign, Kufra was used as a staging post for Allied units such as the Long Range Desert Group and the Special Air Service.

In May 1942 it was a location of the Tragedy at Kufra, where three South African Air Force Bristol Blenheim aircraft became lost and after landing safely the crews subsequently died due to lack of water.

=== After the war ===
After the Axis were expelled from North Africa, and when after the war it became part of independent Libya, the Buma airfield at Kufra was used little and fell into disrepair. The town surrounding the oasis is still dominated by the old fort of El Tag, built by the Italians in the mid-1930s.

On 26 August 2008, a hijacked Sudanese Boeing 737 landed at Kufra Airport after having departed from Nyala Airport, Darfur, for Khartoum. Earlier, Egyptian authorities had refused to allow the plane to land in their national capital, Cairo.

In recent decades, Kufra has become a major point on the route of African migrants who try to reach Europe by various routes, and some of whom get incarcerated in Kufra's notorious prison.

During the 2011 Libyan Civil War, the area was reported to be under control of anti-Gaddafi forces and not the government of Muammar Gaddafi on 2 April 2011. On 28 April 2011, loyalist forces reportedly re-captured Kufra. There were no reports of casualties in the fighting for the town after the rebels put up only light resistance. By 6 May 2011 the town had been retaken by the Libyan rebels. In February 2012, fighting between the Tobu and Zuwayya tribes killed over a hundred people and the town became a focal point for mass human rights violations of refugees and migrants.

In 2026 it was found that the area was the site of an operation which trafficked weapons and Columbian mercenaries during the Sudanese civil war.

== Tourism ==
Kufra is situated in the middle of the Sahara for its pristine desert beauty, so that tours to the oasis are organized by local tour operators.

== Kufra in migrants' routes and human trafficking ==
Migrants coming from the East African coast and the Near East pass through and compulsorily stop in Kufra. It is a little village of transit along the traditional route between Khartoum and the coastal Libyan towns, which has lately turned to be a spot gathering Libyan-Sudanese criminal organizations involved in the illegal transport of immigrants, police officers controlling the boundaries and the need of people working in local productive activities.

The village of Kufra has long been suspected and accused by European Parliamentary delegations as being criminally instrumental in assisting migrants. In 2007, they defined Kufra as "a free zone, a sort of starting Centre of Temporary Permanence CPT against the law... These gathering centres are places, in which the first contacts with the criminal organizations occur. Such organizations promote the "journey of hope", with a flexible handling of the Migrants' African routes according to the restriction policies adopted by the various governments. The minds of the criminal organizations act accordingly to what happens in each country: if Morocco stresses its restrain policies, the routes move towards the Canary Islands, if the controls in Libya increase, the streams are diverted towards Malta. When the migratory stream is over, the routes are back on Libya and Tunisia."

The 1,500-kilometre-long (930 mi) route towards the coastal Libyan towns is done at night on covered trucks. Such journey conditions are described as "hellish". People are often stopped by the police and therefore the route is covered many times in both directions. Once the migrants arrive, or are brought back, in Kufra, the only way to escape this situation is to pay people traders, which are often colluded with the police officers. People brought back to the Sudanese border may reverse the course just with cash money. Hence the occurrence of continuous exploitation, enlistment in the work and prostitution black market, painful waiting for a money order urged by relatives and friends through mobile phone communications, which are allowed only for this aim.

In 2005 Italy allocated funds for the creation of a detention camp at Kufra.

=== Inhuman conditions of detention ===
Kufra jail is defined by Ethiopian and Eritrean migrants, who stayed there, as:

...a place of death. When you hear the sound of the keys in the cell lock your blood freezes. You have to turn towards the wall. If you look them in the eyes, they beat you repeatedly. (Daniel, 22 years old, from Eritrea)

We were about 700 people, about 100 Ethiopians, 200 Eritreans and 400 from Chad and Sudan. We slept on the floor, one on the other, there wasn't even a place to lay down. For lunch: a fist of white rice for the all day, less than 570 grams each. There were also some baguettes, but you needed money to get them... (an ex-colonel of the Eritrean army, political refugee in Italy)

When I saw Kufra I wanted to hitch up. They took my mobile phone and all the money I had in my pocket and put me in to a cell with other 20 people. There is no need in telling you about the dirt, hunger and continuous humiliations. There were also cells for women and children. They were kept separated from us. Women won't ever tell the truth because of shame, but it's useful to make everybody aware of what happened to women in Kufra. They were raped in front of their husbands, their brothers. They used pieces of iron, sticks... It's shameful. They treated us like beasts. (Yakob, another boy from Eritrea)

== Agricultural project ==
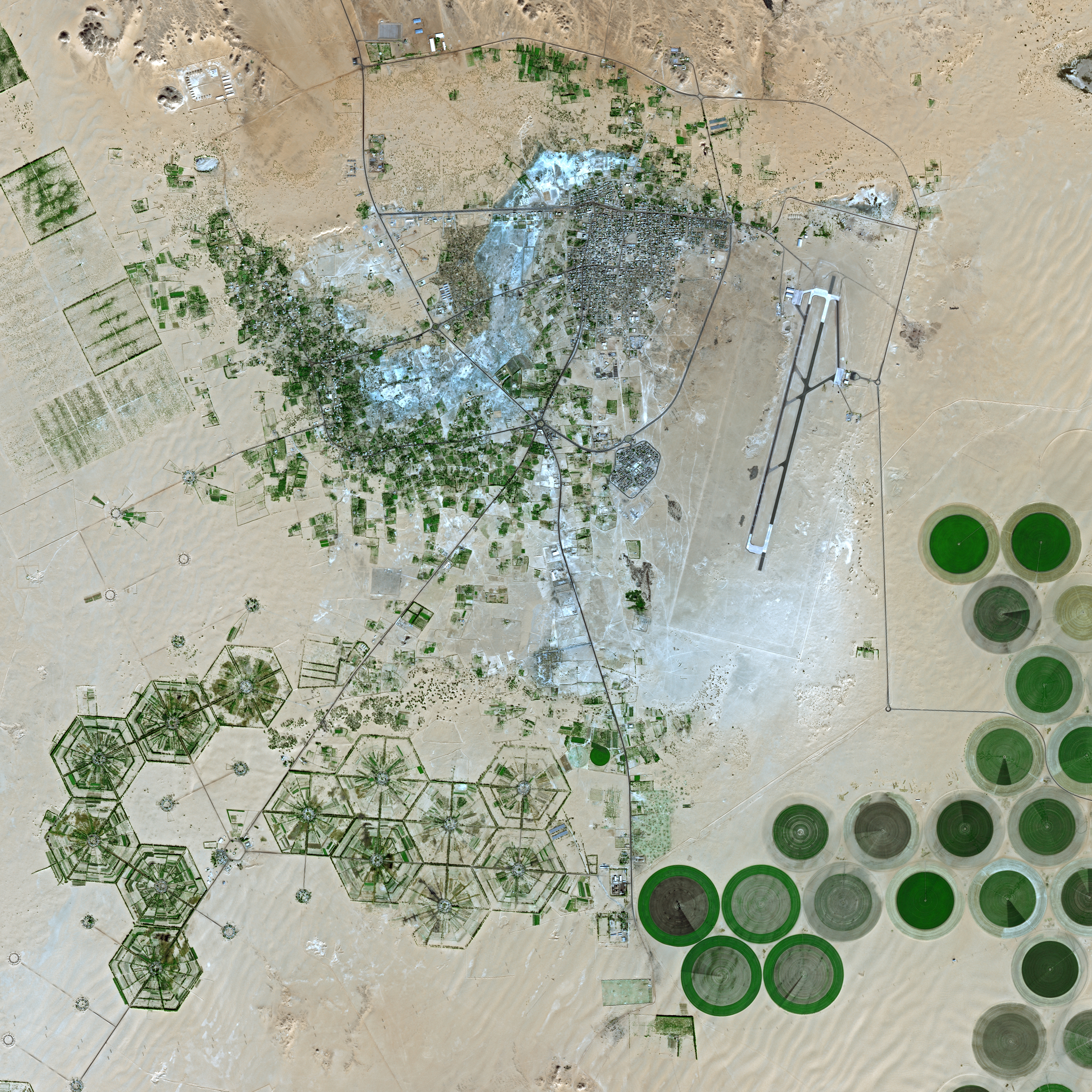
Kufra irrigation circles seen from the SPOT 5 satellite

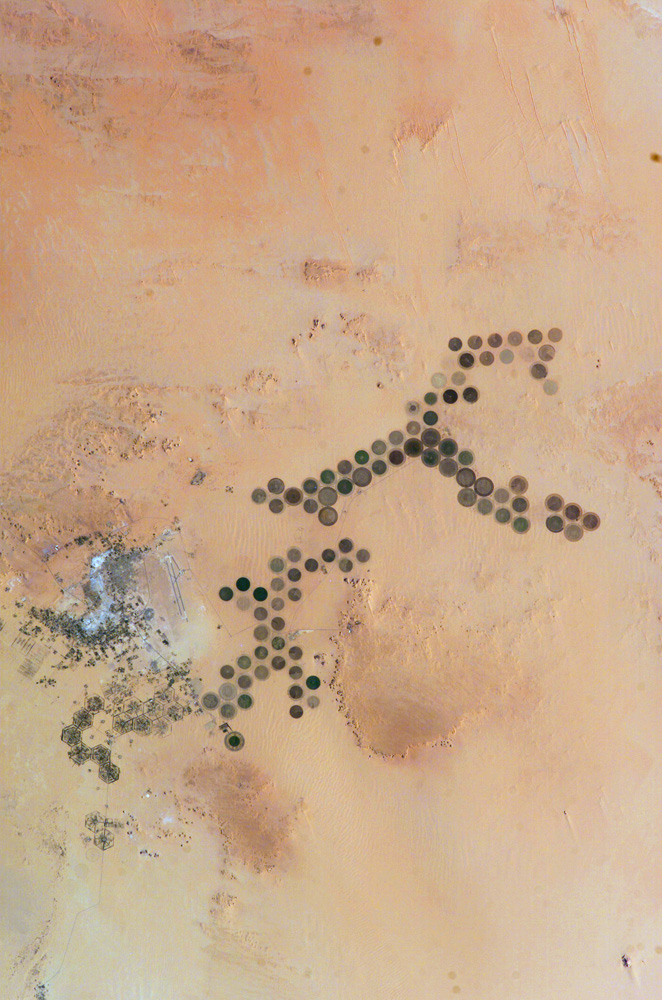
Kufra cultivated areas seen from space

At the beginning of the 1970s, Libya launched a great cultivation project in Kufra aimed at developing agriculture in the desert. LEPA irrigation is provided by fossil water beneath the ground surface, the Nubian Sandstone Aquifer System, a non-renewable source and the only accessible water resource in the area. Rotors (high sprinkler that rotates) provide irrigation and the obtained circles have a diameter of about 1 km and can be observed from space.

This is one of Libya's largest agricultural projects. Because only about two percent of Libya's land receives enough rainfall to be cultivated, this project uses the underground aquifer. The green circles in the desert frequently indicate tracts of agriculture supported by center-pivot irrigation. The agricultural project is an easy-to-recognize landmark for orbiting astronauts aboard the International Space Station. The Libyan government also has a project called the Great Manmade River to pump and transport these groundwater reserves to the coast to support Libya's growing population and industrial development. As of December 2011, the excessive exploitation of the aquifer has provoked the complete drying up of the lake in the oasis.

== Sources ==
- Azmzade, Gokkent; Osmansoy, Senusi (2021). Journey in the Grand Sahara of Africa and Through Time. Gokkent. ISBN 9781737129882.
- Bertarelli, L.V. (1929). Guida d'Italia, Vol. XVII (in Italian). Milano: Consociazione Turistica Italiana.
