= Westworld =

American science fiction–thriller media franchise

- Original film logo
- Created by: Michael Crichton
- Original work: Westworld (1973)
- Owners: Turner Entertainment (Note: Except for Futureworld owned by Amazon MGM Studios) (Skydance)
- Years: 1973-present

Films and television
- Films: Westworld (1973); Futureworld (1976)
- Television series: Beyond Westworld (1980); Westworld (2016–2022)

Games
- Video games: Westworld 2000 (1996); Westworld (2018); Westworld Awakening (2019)

Audio
- Soundtracks: Westworld: Season 1; Westworld: Season 2; Westworld: Season 3; Westworld: Season 4

Westworld is an American science fiction dystopia media franchise that began with the 1973 film Westworld, written and directed by Michael Crichton. The film depicts a technologically advanced Wild-West-themed amusement park populated by androids that malfunction and begin killing the human visitors; it was followed by the sequel film Futureworld (1976). The franchise moved to television in 1980 with the series Beyond Westworld on CBS. In 2016, a new television series based on the original film debuted on HBO; the series broadcast four full seasons before being cancelled.

== Film series ==
=== Westworld (1973) ===
Westworld was the first theatrical feature novelist Michael Crichton directed, after one TV movie. It was also the first feature film to use digital image processing to pixellate photography in order to simulate an android's point of view. The film was nominated for Hugo, Nebula and Saturn awards. The film was well received by critics.

The story is about amusement park robots that malfunction and begin killing visitors. It stars Yul Brynner as an android in a futuristic Western-themed amusement park, and Richard Benjamin and James Brolin as guests of the park.

=== Futureworld (1976) ===
Futureworld is the sequel to the Michael Crichton film. The sequel stars Peter Fonda, Blythe Danner, Arthur Hill, Stuart Margolin, John Ryan, and Yul Brynner, who makes a cameo appearance in a dream sequence. Other than Brynner, none of the cast members from the original film appear, and original writer-director Crichton and original studio Metro-Goldwyn-Mayer were not involved.

The story is set two years after the Westworld tragedy, with the Delos corporation having reopened the park. The story starts when newspaper reporter Chuck Browning (Peter Fonda) and TV reporter Tracy Ballard (Blythe Danner) are invited to review the park.

=== Principal cast ===
Characters	Film	
Characters	Westworld	Futureworld
Characters	1973	1976
The Gunslinger	Yul Brynner	Yul Brynner
Peter Martin	Richard Benjamin	
John Blane	James Brolin	
Chuck Browning		Peter Fonda
Tracy Ballard		Blythe Danner
Dr. Duffy		Arthur Hill
Dr. Schneider		John P. Ryan
Harry		Stuart Margolin

=== Crew ===
Role	Film	
Role	Westworld	Futureworld
Role	1973	1976
Director	Michael Crichton	Richard T. Heffron
Producer	Paul N. Lazarus III	James T. Aubrey & Paul N. Lazarus III
Screenplay	Michael Crichton	Mayo Simon & George Schenck
Composer	Fred Karlin	Fred Karlin
Editor	David Bretherton	James Mitchell
Cinematographer	Gene Polito	Gene Polito & Howard Schwartz
Distributed by	Metro-Goldwyn-Mayer	American International Pictures
Release date	November 21, 1973	August 13, 1976
Running time	88 minutes	104 minutes

== Television series ==
=== Beyond Westworld (1980) ===
Beyond Westworld was created by Michael Crichton which served as a continuation of the two feature films. The series stars Jim McMullan as Security Chief John Moore of the Delos Corporation. The story revolved around Moore having to stop the evil scientist Simon Quaid, as he plans to use the Delos robots to try to take over the world.

It premiered on March 5, 1980, on the television network CBS in the United States. The show was nominated for two Primetime Emmy Awards for Outstanding Achievement in Makeup and Outstanding Art Direction For a Series. Only five episodes were produced, of which three aired before the series' cancellation due to poor ratings.

=== Westworld (2016–2022) ===
Westworld is an American science fiction-thriller television series created by husband-wife duo Jonathan Nolan and Lisa Joy. Nolan serves as executive producer along with Joy, J. J. Abrams and Bryan Burk. The series takes place in fictional Westworld, a technologically advanced, Western-themed amusement park populated completely by synthetic androids dubbed "Hosts". Westworld caters to high-paying visitors dubbed "Newcomers" (also known as "Guests"), who can do whatever they wish within the park, without fear of retaliation from the Hosts.

Westworld premiered on October 2, 2016, on the cable television channel HBO in the United States. The series has been well received. The series has also attained strong Nielsen ratings for HBO, with the U.S. series premiere attracting 1.96 million viewers. A second season began on April 22, 2018, and a third season on March 15, 2020. Season 4 debuted on June 26, 2022. In November 2022, it was announced that HBO had cancelled Westworld.

== Video games ==
A first-person shooter based on the film, titled Westworld 2000, was released in 1996.

A mobile game was released on 2018. After a lawsuit by Bethesda Games accusing Warner of copying Fallout Shelter was settled, the game was shut down in 2019.

An action game based on the TV series, titled Westworld Awakening, was released in 2019 for virtual reality headsets.

== Future Projects ==
In May 2026 it was reported that Warner Brothers had hired David Koepp to write a reboot of the original Westworld movie.

== Westworld in popular culture ==
- 1981: "Do You Believe in the West World" is the lead track and a single from the 1981 album Westworld by British post-punk band Theatre of Hate. The single went on to reach no. 1 in the U.K. independent singles chart.
- 1985: The song "Just Give 'em Whiskey" by Colourbox contains samples from the trailer of the film. In the film, in fact, the voice-over is performed by a different voice
- 1991: The Red Dwarf episode "Meltdown" is based on the 1973 film Westworld.
- 2001: Stephen Malkmus mentions Yul Brynner and Westworld in the track "Jo Jo's Jacket" from his 2001 eponymous album.
- 2004: Post-rock supergroup Valley of the Giants' self-titled album contains the track "Westworld," based on the film.
