= B-25 Mitchell aircraft in Catch-22 =

Aircraft used in 1970 film

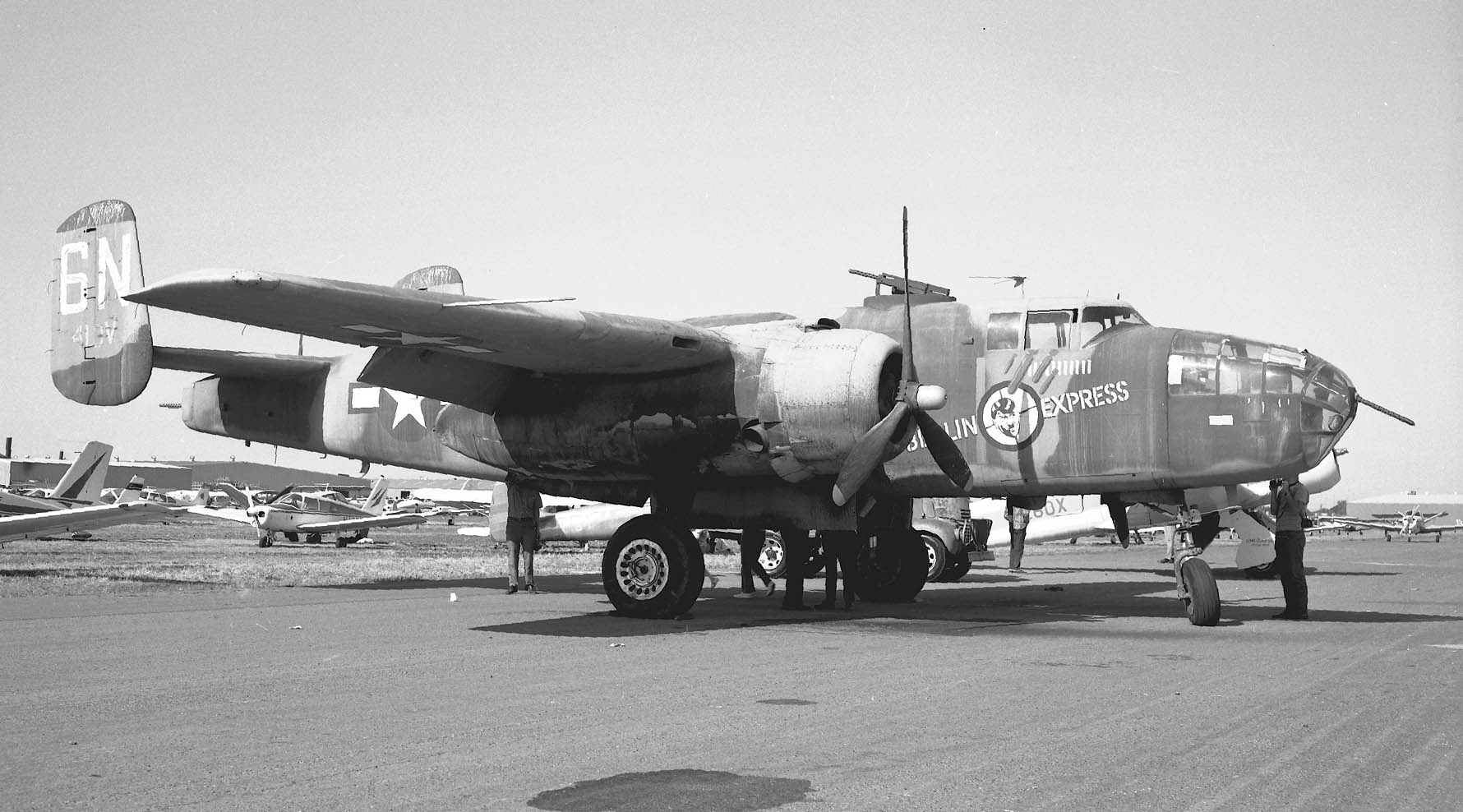
B-25 from the movie Catch 22.

When the 1970 film adaptation of Catch-22 began preliminary production, Paramount made a decision to hire the Tallmantz Aviation organization to obtain sufficient North American B-25 Mitchell (B-25) bomber aircraft to recreate a Mediterranean wartime base depicted in the novel. Tallmantz president, Frank G. Tallman found the war-surplus aircraft. He also gathered personnel to fly and maintain the fleet.

== Aircraft ==
Catch-22's budget could accommodate 17 flyable B-25s, and an additional non-flyable hulk was acquired in Mexico, made barely ferriable, and flown with its landing gear down to the Guaymas, Sonora, Mexico, filming location, only to be burned and destroyed in the landing crash scene. The wreck was then buried in the ground next to the runway, where it remains.

Paramount planned to film the Catch-22 aerial sequences for six weeks but the production required three months to shoot; the bombers flew a total of about 1,500 hours and appeared on-screen for 12 minutes.

Fifteen of the 18 bombers used in the film remain intact, including one housed at the Smithsonian Institution's National Air and Space Museum.

6A
B-25H-1NA 43-4643 (N1203), " The Bug Smasher ", Olive Drab B-25C - Destroyed in a crash in 1978. Used as a camera ship during filming.

6B
B-25J-30NC 44-86843 (N3507G), " Passionette Paulette 03507G " - presently displayed at the Grissom Air Museum at Grissom Air Reserve Base, Indiana, (D)

6C
B-25J-25NC 44-29939 (N9456Z), (girl on bomb) 09456Z ", Camouflage B-25J - airworthy with the Mid-Atlantic Air Museum in Reading, Pennsylvania. Flies as Briefing Time.

6D
B-25J-30NC 44-31032 (N3174G), " Free, Fast and Ready 13174G ", Olive Drab B-25J - on display at the March Field Air Museum at March Air Reserve Base in Riverside, California. Marked as Problem Child.

6F
B-25J-15NC 44-28925 (N7687C), " Tokyo Express " - airworthy storage at the Cavanaugh Flight Museum in Addison, Texas. Flies as How 'Boot That!? To be moved to North Texas Regional Airport in Denison, Texas, due to the permanent closure of the Addison museum.

6G
B-25J-5NC 43-28204 (N9856C), " Booby Trap 39856C ", Olive Drab B-25J - airworthy with Aero Trader in Chino, California. Flies as Pacific Princess.

6H
B-25J-25NC 44-30748 (N8195H), Camouflage B-25J - airworthy with the Erickson Aircraft Collection in Madras, Oregon. Flies as Heavenly Body.

6I
B-25J-30NC 44-30925 (N9494Z), " Laden Maiden ", Desert Tan B-25J - under restoration with the Belgian Aviation Preservation Association, Belgium, (R)

6J
B-25J-30NC 44-86701 (N7681C), " Annzas " - 25 missions, Camouflage B-25J - destroyed in a hangar fire at Musee de l'Air in Paris, France.

6K
B-25J-25NC 44-30801 (N3699G), " Vestal Virgin 13699G ", Olive Drab B-25J - airworthy with the American Aeronautical Foundation at Camarillo Airport, Camarillo, California. Flies as Executive Sweet.

6M
B-25J-20NC 44-29366 (N9115Z), " aBominable Snowman ", Olive Drab B-25J - displayed at the Royal Air Force Museum London at the former Hendon Aerodrome in London, United Kingdom.

6N
B-25H-1NA 43-4432 (N10V), " Berlin Express 410V ", Camouflage B-25J - airworthy with the Experimental Aircraft Association Museum in Oshkosh, Wisconsin. Flies as Berlin Express.

6Q
B-25J-25NC 44-30077 (N2849G), " The Denver Dumper ", Olive Drab B-25J - presently displayed at the Pearl Harbor Aviation Museum on Ford Island in Pearl Harbor, Hawaii, (D)

6S
B-25J-35NC 44-8843 (XB-HEY), Camouflage B-25C - Destroyed during filming.

6V
B-25J-25NC 44-30493 (N9451Z), " Dumbo 39451Z ", Olive Drab B-25C - displayed at Malmstrom AFB in Great Falls, Montana.

6W
B-25J-25NC 44-30649 (N9452Z), " Hot Pants 32452Z ", B-25C - displayed at Maxwell AFB in Montgomery, Alabama.

6Y
B-25J-20NC 44-29887 (N10564), " 6Y Luscious Lulu, Olive Drab - in storage at the National Air and Space Museum. Marked as Carol Jean.

6?
B-25J-25NC 44-30823 (N1042B), (nude on bomb) Olive Drab - airworthy with the Mid America Flight Museum in Mount Pleasant, Texas. Flies as God and Country. Used as a camera ship during filming.

Dumbo
B-25J, nose section, Tennessee Air Museum, Sevierville, Tennessee, (D)

All the B-25s had the tip of the vertical stabilizer painted blue.

For the film, mock upper turrets were installed. To represent different models several aircraft had the turrets installed behind the wings representing early (B-25C/D type) aircraft. Initially, the camera ships also had the mock turrets installed, but problems with buffeting required their removal.

== See also ==
- B-25 Mitchell aircraft in Catch-22 (2019 miniseries)
- List of surviving North American B-25 Mitchells
- Catch-22 (film)
