= Extreme Close-Up (film) =

- Theatrical release poster
- Directed by: Jeannot Szwarc
- Written by: Michael Crichton
- Produced by: Paul Lazarus III
- Starring: Jim McMullan; Katherine Woodville; James A. Watson Jr. Bara Byrnes
- Cinematography: Paul Lohmann
- Music by: Basil Poledouris
- Distributed by: National General Pictures
- Release date: May 16, 1973
- Running time: 80 minutes
- Country: United States
- Language: English
- Budget: $209,000

Extreme Close-Up is a 1973 film directed by Jeannot Szwarc and written by Michael Crichton. It deals with privacy in an ever growing technological age.

It was also known as Sex Through a Window.

== Plot ==
John Norman, a television reporter rents surveillance equipment for a story on the intrusion of surreptitious surveillance in peoples' private lives. He spies on his neighbors and eventually a broader range of citizens, finding himself caught up in the dark world of voyeurism.

== Cast ==
- Jim McMullan as John Norman
- Katherine Woodville as Sally Norman
- James A. Watson Jr. as Cameraman
- Bara Byrnes as Sylvia Marina
- Al Checco as Surveillance Salesman
- Jacqueline Giroux as Barbie
- Curtis Credel as Reporter

== Production ==
Producer Paul Lazarus III says Extreme Close-Up was inspired in part by the success of I Am Curious (Yellow). He approached Michael Crichton with whom he made Westworld (1973) and suggested they make a film which got some nudity on screen "without creating some kind of uproar that ruins people." They came up with the story and Crichton wrote the script. "This was an era of grainy 8mm stag films," said Lazarus, "Our thinking was we could put what nudity we wanted...into a kind of action thriller format."

Crichton said "I intended it to be an X-rated film, a voyeuristic movie that was meant to make viewers uncomfortable."

Lazarus sold the film to a financier, Ted Mann, on the basis of Crichton's reputation. He offered to make the whole movie for $209,000.

Crichton said "I thought I'd written a very good screenplay but the people I'd written it for didn't trust me to direct it. I was directing a TV movie at the time it was shot so I couldn't have directed it anyway."

The movie was directed by Jeannot Szwarc was hired in part because he was French "and we thought he'd known how to do this," according to Lazarus III.

Ted Mann arranged a distribution deal with National General, who later changed the title to Sex Through a Window.

According to Crichton, he "became interested in the idea of making an X-rated film that would also be a good movie. What happened to it was that it got shot as a soft R, and that just destroyed it. I mean it really had a hard edge that I thought was interesting, and it was a good script, but it had to be an X. The minute it was not an X, it was just all over. I wasn't involved in the production... it was a low budget picture that didn't turn out as I hoped."

== Reception ==
The film failed commercially and Lazarus claims Crichton took it off his filmography. Crichton said "the final movie doesn't make any sense because it's not tough enough. It was an R-rated nothing."

The San Francisco Examiner called the film "a tedious castigation of voyeurism that makes the viewer an unwitting voyeur" and "a tawdry sexploitation film and a mighty dull one at that." The New York Daily News wrote the script was "improbable" and that the "cast acts as if their primary business is television commercials or magazine fashion ads." However, the Sacramento Union called it "a chilling and timely film", which was "an effective, low-key statement about a somewhat horrifying modern dilemma."

The New York Times dismissed it as "the most pointless movie of the year." Variety called it "a tedious sexploitationer" that was "clumsily directed... from a shallow script."

== See also ==
- List of American films of 1973
