= Westworld 2000 =

1996 video game

- Developer: Brooklyn Multimedia
- Publisher: Byron Preiss Multimedia
- Series: Westworld
- Platform: Windows
- Release: WW: 1996
- Genre: First-person shooter
- Modes: Single-player, multiplayer

Westworld 2000 is a video game developed by American studio Brooklyn Multimedia and published by Byron Preiss Multimedia for Windows in 1996.

== Gameplay ==
Westworld 2000 is a 3D first-person shooter based on the 1973 film Westworld.

== Reception ==
Next Generation reviewed the game, rating it one star out of five, and stated that "The idea is fine, it's the execution that hurts. The first-person engine is sluggish, like something developed before even Wolfenstein 3D. The delay between a keypress and actual movement is unacceptable, and the graphics are as flat as they come - it feels more like you're dealing with cardboard cutouts than any sort of 3D realm. Avoid this title at all costs."
