= Hanover Street (film) =

1979 film by Peter Hyams

- Theatrical release poster by John Alvin
- Directed by: Peter Hyams
- Written by: Peter Hyams
- Produced by: Paul N. Lazarus III
- Starring: Harrison Ford; Lesley-Anne Down; Christopher Plummer; Alec McCowen; Richard Masur; Michael Sacks
- Cinematography: David Watkin
- Edited by: James Mitchell
- Music by: John Barry
- Production company: Hanover Street Productions
- Distributed by: Columbia Pictures
- Release dates: 18 May 1979 (US); 13 September 1979 (UK)
- Running time: 109 minutes
- Countries: United States; United Kingdom
- Language: English
- Budget: $8 million
- Box office: $3 million (US only)

Hanover Street is a 1979 American-British romantic war film written and directed by Peter Hyams and starring Harrison Ford, Lesley-Anne Down and Christopher Plummer. It was distributed by Columbia Pictures.

== Plot ==
In London during World War II, Lieutenant David Halloran, a United States Army Air Forces B-25 bomber pilot with the Eighth Air Force, and Margaret Sellinger, an English nurse, meet on Hanover Street in a chance encounter. The following day, Halloran's squadron is sent to bomb Rouen in Nazi-occupied France when the plane's engine is hit, but the fire is put out. Cimino, the bombardier, begs Halloran to let him drop the bombs early and turn back, but Halloran does not care about the danger and orders him to wait until they are over the target, prompting Cimino to angrily exclaim that he hates Halloran.

Halloran and Sellinger meet again two weeks later in a secret assignation on Hanover Street and they rapidly fall in love. Although she is married and tries to resist, she is drawn to the charismatic American and they begin an affair. By contrast, her husband Paul Sellinger is, by his own description, suave and pleasant but fairly dull. A former teacher, he is now a trusted member of British intelligence. During the next few missions, Halloran orders Cimino to drop the bombs early, as he is scared of death because he now has "a reason to live", much to the anger and disappointment of his co-pilot Hyer. Weeks later, Halloran claims to hear something odd in an engine before take-off and turns back, forcing another pilot, Patman, to go in his place. On the mission, Patman's bomber is hit and explodes, leaving no survivors. Guilt-stricken and doubting himself, Halloran runs to his plane and begs the mechanic on duty to confirm he found a problem with the engine. A vengeful superior officer doubts Halloran's engine malfunction was genuine and forces him to volunteer for an undercover mission to deliver a British agent into occupied France. At the last moment, Paul Sellinger wearing a SS officer's uniform takes the place of the agent, and himself joins the mission. His reasons are initially unclear, but he slowly reveals that he wants to prove himself in the field.

The plane is hit by anti-aircraft fire near Lyon and the crew is killed except for Halloran and Sellinger, who are forced to parachute from the aircraft. After Sellinger injures his ankle, Halloran agrees to help him with his mission to infiltrate the Gestapo headquarters in Lyon, posing as an SS officer and photograph an important document that lists the German double agents in British intelligence. They take shelter in a barn and are assisted by the farmer's daughter, a member of the French Resistance. Sellinger is able to photograph the documents before alarm is raised when Halloran makes the incorrect response to a question in German, but the pair manage to escape back to the farm after a lengthy motorcycle chase. Sellinger says he was motivated to volunteer for the mission to impress his wife, who Halloran then discovers is Margaret. The farmer's daughter tells them the French Resistance has prepared to help them escape from France. However, the farmer reports them to the Germans who then surround the barn, but they successfully escape again when they are assisted by the French Resistance, though Sellinger is badly injured.

In London, Margaret finds out that Halloran and Sellinger are together and have come back home, with her husband wounded but alive. Going to visit him in the hospital on Hanover Street, she meets Lieutenant Halloran for the last time. They embrace and kiss, and he tells her that he loves her "enough to let her go", she goes in to see her husband as he goes back out into Hanover Street, where the love story had begun.

== Cast ==
- Harrison Ford as Lt. David Halloran
- Lesley-Anne Down as Margaret Sellinger
- Christopher Plummer as Paul Sellinger
- Alec McCowen as Maj. Trumbo Marty Lynch
- Michael Sacks as 2nd Lt. Martin Hyer (Halloran's co-pilot)
- Richard Masur as 2nd Lt. Jerry Cimino (Halloran's bombardier/navigator)
- John Ratzenberger as Sgt. John Lucas (Halloran's engineer/turret gunner)
- Jay Benedict as Cpl. Daniel Giler (Halloran's radio operator/waist gunner)
- Eric Stine as Farrell (Halloran's tail gunner)
- Patsy Kensit as Sarah Sellinger
- Max Wall as Harry Pike
- Shane Rimmer as Col. Ronald Bart
- Sherrie Hewson as Phyllis
- George Pravda as French farmer
- Suzanne Bertish as French farmer's daughter
- Jeff Hawke as Patman (cameo)

== Production ==
=== Development ===
Peter Hyams' career was in a slump after the failure of Peeper (1975). He wrote the script for Telefon but was not able to direct it. He then wrote Hanover Street and said "that was a script that got a lot of attention and people wanted. I was offered an absolute fortune to sell the script but not direct it. I was running out of money and I had a wife and two babies." Hyams said his wife told him "if you sell that script I'm going to leave you," so he decided not to sell the script. The success of Capricorn One enabled Hyams to direct Hanover Street. Finance was provided by General Cinema.

The film was said to have been inspired by the 1940 film Waterloo Bridge and "other pix of that ilk."

=== Casting ===
Kris Kristofferson was cast as the male lead in the film and Genevieve Bujold as the female lead. Kristofferson was intrigued by the aerial sequences he had read in the script, as he had served as a helicopter pilot with the 82nd Airborne Division of the U.S. Army for five years. Bujold wanted to make the film because it was a love story; she also related to the subject matter of a married woman falling in love while married, because that had happened to her in real life. Christopher Plummer signed to play the third lead.

However, Kristofferson dropped out of the film. (Note: In a 1978 interview, Kristofferson said that he regretted the 1976 film Vigilante Force and was quitting acting to focus on music. A year later, Kristofferson's acting career resumed and he agreed to star in Heaven's Gate (1980).) Harrison Ford, in Europe working on Force 10 from Navarone with Robert Shaw, was persuaded to take the lead role.

When Kristofferson dropped out, Bujold decided to leave the film as well. She was replaced by Lesley Anne Down. Down said she read the script quickly and only her part. "I expected it to be sweet, sickly and over the top and it was," she later said of the film.

=== Historical accuracy ===
The B-25 Mitchell bomber was featured prominently in Hanover Street, although the aircraft was a rare sight in England during World War II, except in squadrons allocated to the Royal Air Force's 2nd Tactical Air Force on strikes into occupied France in company with the de Havilland Mosquito prior to, and after, D-Day. (Note: No USAAF B-25 units were ever assigned to the United Kingdom during World War II.) The typical medium bomber in use by the Eighth Air Force based in England was the Martin B-26 Marauder, but the film-makers were forced to use the B-25 due to there being so few B-26 Marauders that remained in existence.

In the film, Margaret Sellinger emerges from a Piccadilly line tube station called "Hanover Street". In reality there was no such station and, since Hanover Street links upper Regent Street and Brook Street; this would not, in any case, match the alignment of the Piccadilly line, unless there were a fictitious spur similar to that which ran from Holborn to Aldwych from 1907 to 1994.

Paul Sellinger, while posing as an SS officer at the Gestapo headquarters, consistently states his own rank in German using the Wehrmacht ranking system rather the separate SS rank system.

=== Aircraft ===
All five B-25s in Hanover Street were staged in formation for the opening raid sequence; the first time since Catch 22 in 1970 that a massed aerial sequence of B-25s was filmed.

The aerial sequences were mostly filmed at the by then-disused Bovingdon airfield using five North American B-25 Mitchell bombers flown over to England from USA specially for the filming. Scenes showing the B25s flying through flak on the bombing run were filmed at Little Rissington, the simulated flak bursts being provided by current British AA gunners.

Movie serial #	Nickname	Aircraft type	Actual serial #	Registration #	Disposition
151632	Gorgeous George-Ann	B-25J-30NC	44-30925	N9494Z	Brussels Air Museum
151645	Marvellous Miriam	B-25J-20NC	44-29366	N9115Z	RAF Museum Hendon
151790	Amazing Andrea	B-25J-30NC	44-86701	N7681C	Destroyed – Hangar Fire
151863	Big Bad Bonnie	B-25J-30NC	44-30210	N9455Z	California
151724	Brenda's Boys	B-25J-20NC	44-29121	N86427	Museo del Aire, Madrid, Spain

=== Filming ===
Ford said he accepted the role "because I had never played a love scene in all my years in the movies. I thought that the part would help me grow, but I hated making that film from start to finish." He said he "never saw" the film. "They wanted me to promote it but they wouldn't show it to me and I'd never pay to see it. It was a terrible experience."

== Reception ==
=== Box office ===
The film earned $1.5 million in the U.S. in 1979 and was considered a box-office failure.

=== Critical reception ===
Hanover Street received decidedly mixed reviews from critics. Vincent Canby referred to that fame in his review:

Every now and then a film comes along of such painstaking, overripe foolishness that it breaks through the garbage barrier to become one of those rare movies you rush to see for laughs. What Peter Hyams has achieved with Hanover Street, his new film about a wartime romance set in the London of 1943, is a movie that is almost as funny as Woody Allen's What's Up, Tiger Lily? which, if you remember, was a straight-faced Japanese spy picture that Woody took over and dubbed with a hilariously knuckle-brained English language soundtrack. The clichés were everywhere, but always just slightly out of place and inappropriate. This pretty much describes the unfortunate method of Hanover Street, which looks as if Mr. Hyams had studied every popular romantic drama, from A Farewell to Arms to Love Affair and Love Story, and then, when he left the screening room, had been hit on the head with a brick. ... [Ford's] more of a comic-strip character here than he was in Star Wars, which was a live-action cartoon.

Variety wrote that the film is "reasonably effective as a war film with a love story background. Unfortunately it's meant to be a love story set against a war background." It also notes: "Down again distinguishes herself in a role that doesn't seem up to her standards, while Ford back in the pilot's seat again projects an earnest, if dull, presence. Rest of the cast is underused. John Barry has contributed a score that evokes Douglas Sirk's glossy tearjerkers of the 1950s." Film reviewer Leonard Maltin had a similar critique, calling Hanover Street, "slick, but contrived and unconvincing."

On the review aggregator website Rotten Tomatoes, 70% of 10 critics' reviews are positive, with an average rating of 5.4/10. Metacritic, which uses a weighted average, assigned the film a score of 32 out of 100, based on 4 critics, indicating "generally unfavorable reviews".

=== Awards ===
Patsy Kensit was nominated for, but did not win, the Best Juvenile Actress in a Motion Picture award for 1980 from Young Artists Awards.

=== Other ===
The film has developed a following among film fans and aviation enthusiasts due to the flying sequences.

== Bibliography ==
- Calvert, Dennis. "The Mitchells of Hanover Street." Air Progress Aviation, Volume 7, No. 1, Spring 1983.
- Carlson, Mark. Flying on Film: A Century of Aviation in the Movies, 1912–2012. Duncan, Oklahoma: BearManor Media, 2012. ISBN 978-1-59393-219-0.
- Donald, David, ed. American Warplanes of World War II. London: Aerospace Publishing, 1995. ISBN 1-874023-72-7.
- Jenkins, Gary. Harrison Ford: Imperfect Hero. New York: Citadel, 1998. ISBN 978-0-80658-016-6.
- Maltin, Leonard. Leonard Maltin's Movie Guide 2009. New York: New American Library, 2009 (originally published as TV Movies, then Leonard Maltin's Movie & Video Guide), First edition 1969, published annually since 1988. ISBN 978-0-451-22468-2.
