= Futureworld =

1976 film by Richard T. Heffron

- Theatrical release poster
- Directed by: Richard T. Heffron
- Written by: Mayo Simon; George Schenck
- Produced by: Paul N. Lazarus III; James T. Aubrey
- Starring: Peter Fonda; Blythe Danner; Arthur Hill; Stuart Margolin; John Ryan; Yul Brynner
- Cinematography: Howard Schwartz; Gene Polito
- Edited by: James Mitchell
- Music by: Fred Karlin
- Production company: The Aubrey Company
- Distributed by: American International Pictures
- Release date: July 14, 1976
- Running time: 107 minutes
- Country: United States
- Language: English
- Budget: $2.5 million
- Box office: $4.2 million (US/Canada theatrical rentals)

Futureworld is a 1976 American cyberpunk thriller film directed by Richard T. Heffron and written by Mayo Simon and George Schenck. It is a sequel to the 1973 Michael Crichton film Westworld, and is the second installment in the Westworld franchise. The film stars Peter Fonda, Blythe Danner, Arthur Hill, Stuart Margolin, John Ryan, and Yul Brynner, who makes an appearance in a dream sequence; no other cast member from the original film appears. Westworld's writer-director, Michael Crichton, and the original studio Metro-Goldwyn-Mayer were not involved in this production. Composer Fred Karlin was retained.

The film attempted to take the plot in a different direction from Westworld, but it was not well received by U.S. critics. French critics appreciated the film more, appearing on the list of best science fiction films ever made in Demain la Science Fiction. It was made by American International Pictures (its predecessor was made by Metro-Goldwyn-Mayer, which later bought AIP's successor Orion Pictures). A short-lived television series titled Beyond Westworld followed.

== Plot ==
In 1985, two years after the Westworld tragedy, the Delos Corporation owners have reopened the park after spending $1.5 billion in safety improvements, and also shutting down Westworld. For publicity purposes, newspaper reporter Chuck Browning and TV reporter Tracy Ballard are invited to review the park.

Just before the junket is announced, Browning arranges to meet with a Delos employee who promises he has dirt on the corporation. During the meeting, the tipster is shot in the back and dies after giving Browning an envelope.

At the resort, guests choose from four theme parks: Spaworld ("where old age and pain have been eliminated"), Medievalworld, Romanworld and Futureworld. Browning and Ballard choose Futureworld, which simulates an orbiting space station. Robots are available for sex as well as amusements like boxing. They are guided through the resort by Dr. Duffy, who shows them the marvels of Delos, demonstrating that all the problems have been fixed.

The reporters are stunned to find that the Control Center is staffed entirely by robots. That night, their dinners are drugged, and while they sleep, medical tests are conducted so Delos can make clones of them. A visiting Russian general and a Japanese politician are also tested for cloning. Back in her room a few hours later, Ballard wakes in a fright, remembering the experience as a nightmare.

Ballard and Browning sneak out to explore the resort's underground areas. They end up triggering a cloning machine, which generates three samurai from the development of an Eastworld park. Just as they are about to be captured by the samurai, a mechanic named Harry saves them. He takes them back to his quarters, where he cohabits with a mechanic robot he has named Clark after Superman's alter-ego. The reporters interview Harry, but they are interrupted by Dr. Schneider and two security officers, and escorted back to their rooms, where they kiss.

The following day, while Ballard is testing out a Delos dream-recording device (which includes a dream sequence of being saved by, dancing with, and making out with the Gunslinger), Browning slips out to see Harry. Harry takes him to a locked door that he has never been able to enter, although robots routinely enter. Realizing the key is in the robot's eyes, Harry destroys a robot and steals its face. They return with Ballard and open the door. Inside, they find clones of themselves, as well as clones of the Russian and Japanese leaders. The clones are instructed always to work for the good of Delos and to destroy their originals. Browning explains that his tipster's envelope was filled with clippings about leaders from around the world, realizing that Delos must be cloning the rich and powerful.

The trio decides to flee the resort on the next plane. The reporters return to their apartment where Duffy is waiting for them; he explains that, by cloning world leaders, they can ensure that nothing harms Delos' interests, and that without "proper" guidance, humans will eventually destroy the planet. Cloning the reporters would ensure favorable coverage, letting people forget about the Westworld tragedy. Browning attacks Duffy but is easily overpowered by Duffy's unnatural strength. Ballard shoots the doctor twice, and Browning peels back Duffy's face to reveal that he is a robot.

As Harry races to meet up with the reporters, he runs into Browning's clone, who kills him. Ballard and Browning are then chased by their own duplicates, who taunt them all the while with details about their lives. Eventually, one of each pair is killed, though which one is left unclear. When they find each other, Browning seizes and kisses Ballard.

In the end, as they leave the resort with the other guests, Dr. Schneider meets them to make sure they are the clones. The reporters confirm that they will be writing positive reviews for Delos, but, just as they reach the exit, Ballard's badly injured clone stumbles towards him and Schneider realizes too late that he has been fooled. On the jetway, Browning tells Ballard that his editor is running the exposé on Delos, that the whole world will know what they are up to, and that kissing her was his idea to figure out whether or not she was a duplicate.

== Cast ==
- Peter Fonda as Chuck Browning
- Blythe Danner as Tracy Ballard
- Arthur Hill as Dr. Duffy
- Yul Brynner as the Gunslinger
- John Ryan as Dr. Morton Schneider
- Stuart Margolin as Harry Croft
- James M. Connor as Clark the robot
- Allen Ludden as game show host
- Robert Cornthwaite as Mr. Reed
- Angela Greene as Mrs. Reed
- Darrell Larson as Eric
- Nancy Bell as Erica
- John Fujioka as Mr. Takaguchi
- Bert Conroy as Mr. Karnovsky
- Dorothy Konrad as Mrs. Karnovsky
- Jim Antonio as Ron Thurlow

== Production ==
The film was developed by Metro-Goldwyn-Mayer, which had produced Westworld. Michael Crichton did not wish to be involved in a sequel, so they approached the original producer Paul Lazarus III. He developed an idea set in a successor world to Westworld where robots are cloning world leaders. He found a writer and developed a script; MGM decided to only make one science fiction film that year, Logan's Run. Futureworld was put into turnaround. Lazarus had trouble finding production and distribution for the film elsewhere, because other studios were confused and wary after MGM passed on it, especially since the original film had been a financial success for MGM. Lazarus was approached by former MGM president James T. Aubrey who said he could get the film made. He arranged financing from Samuel Z. Arkoff's American International Pictures.

Futureworld was the first major feature film to use 3D computer-generated imagery (CGI). CGI was used for an animated hand and face. The animated hand was a digitized version of Edwin Catmull's left hand, taken from his 1972 experimental short subject A Computer Animated Hand. The animated face was taken from Fred Parke's 1974 experimental short subject Faces & Body Parts.

The film also used the 2D technique of digital compositing to materialize characters over the background. Futureworld utilized the "Logan apartment set" from Logan's Run and redressed it to be the Futureworld bar.

=== Filming ===
Much of the film was shot in the greater Houston area, including Intercontinental Airport, Jones Hall, and the Johnson Space Center. The film includes a chase scene through the underground pedestrian Houston tunnel system running under the city.

== Release ==
Lazarus admits the film "wasn't a very good picture" but put its poor commercial performance down to the fact that AIP was focusing on its prestige film A Matter of Time (1976).

In 1979, Futureworld became the first modern American film to achieve general theatrical release in China.

=== Critical reception ===
Richard Eder panned the film in The New York Times, quoting Ballard's line from the movie, "This is about as exciting as a visit to the water works." Coining his own variation on the phrase, Eder also claimed the film is "as much fun as running barefoot on Astroturf." He added, "It is all the most ordinary kind of hardware science fiction, full of computers and empty of thought." Writing that Danner and Fonda have "absolutely nothing to do" in the film, he concluded that "starring in Futureworld must be the actor's equivalent of going on welfare." Gene Siskel of the Chicago Tribune gave the film two stars out of four and criticized the "dumb story," although he did think it had "some of the best gadgets since the early James Bond pictures ... Too bad 'Futureworld' didn't dream up more of these gizmos."

Arthur D. Murphy of Variety wrote, "'Futureworld' shapes up a strong sequel to MGM's 'Westworld' of three years ago ... Richard T. Heffron, on his second feature directing work, keeps the personal drama moving smartly through the gadgetry montages." Kevin Thomas of the Los Angeles Times called the film "an extreme rarity, a sequel that's a decided improvement over the original." Gary Arnold of The Washington Post wrote, "Unlike 'Westworld' there's nothing shrewd or compelling behind the events in 'Futureworld,' where the big mystery is just an old wheeze—the managers of the park are power-hungry scientists who clone influential guests and order the clones to dispose of the originals." John Pym of The Monthly Film Bulletin expressed disappointment that the scriptwriters neglected to explore the interesting implications of self-programming robots and instead "seem content to do little more than lead the players through the standard diversions of a caper movie."

On the review aggregator website Rotten Tomatoes, the film has an approval rating of 29% based on 14 reviews, with an average grade of 4.9 out of 10.

=== Alternative version ===
For its initial television broadcast, an alternative version of the scene where Browning gives the finger to Dr. Schneider was shot. Instead, he performs a bras d'honneur.

== Home media ==
As of 2011, Futureworld was released on VHS, CED, LaserDisc and DVD in the United States from MGM in December 2010, as well as being released in a number of foreign territories in the DVD format. On December 2, 2011, Futureworld was released in Germany on Blu-ray (German and English audio tracks). The digital release is in the widescreen format.

Shout! Factory released Futureworld on Blu-ray on March 26, 2013.

Arrow Video released the film on 4K Ultra HD Blu-ray on October 20, 2026.
