= Jim McMullan =

American actor (1936–2019)

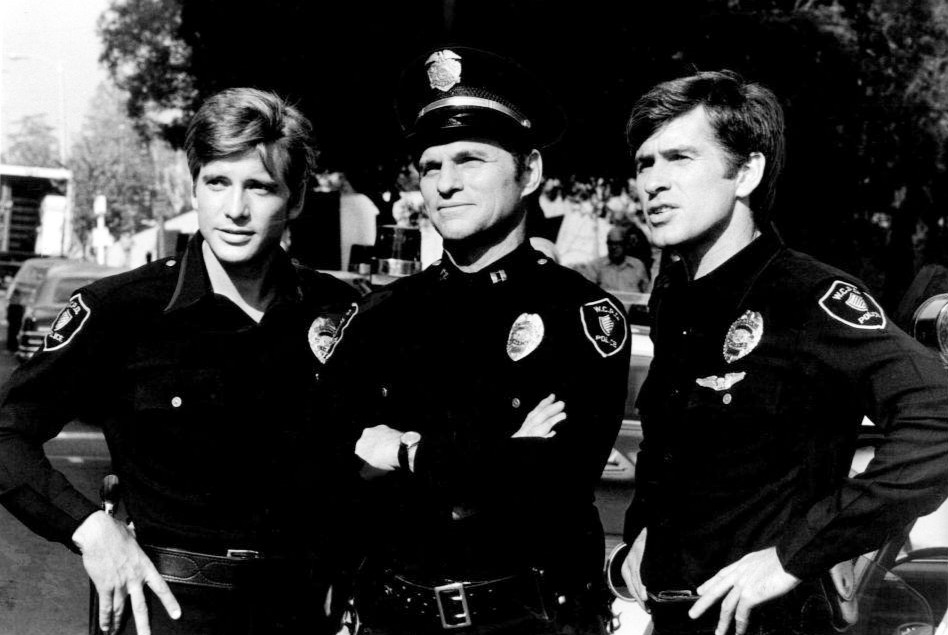
- McMullan (right) with Dirk Benedict and Ted Hartley in 1974
- Born: October 13, 1936; Long Beach, New York, U.S.
- Died: May 31, 2019 (aged 82); Wofford Heights, California, US
- Occupation: Actor
- Years active: 1962–2019
- Spouse: Helene Slack (m. 1970)
- Children: 2

James P. McMullan (October 13, 1936 – May 31, 2019) was an American actor from Long Island, New York, best known for his role as Dr. Terry McDaniel on the 1960s series Ben Casey and as Senator Andrew Dowling on the CBS primetime soap opera Dallas.

McMullan studied Industrial Design at New York University and Parsons School of Design; he graduated from the University of Kansas in 1961 with a Bachelor of Architecture degree.

== Career ==
Born in Long Beach, Long Island, he went to Hollywood in 1961 to visit a friend and through a chance meeting with playwright William Inge, was given a screen test for Sam Peckinpah's Ride the High Country (1962) (Peckinpah also directed the screen test). The test was sent to Universal Pictures, which put him under a seven-year contract, the start of a successful 30-year film career. In 1962 McMullan appeared as Jess Kroeger on the TV western The Virginian on the episode titled "Impasse."

McMullan starred as John Moore on the short-lived CBS-TV series Beyond Westworld and as Officer Don Burdick on the series Chopper One.

McMullan co-starred in a number of notable TV series including the Alfred Hitchcock Hour, Dr. Kildare, The Time Tunnel, Hart to Hart, Cannon, S.W.A.T, Barnaby Jones, The Fall Guy, Daniel Boone and Baywatch. He guest-starred in over 150 TV shows including MacGyver, Doogie Howser, M.D., The Six Million Dollar Man, The Rockford Files, The Young and the Restless, The A-Team, and the made for-TV movie The Taking of Flight 847: The Uli Derickson Story (1988).

McMullan's many feature film credits include The Raiders (1963), where he played the part of Buffalo Bill Cody, Shenandoah (1965), The Happiest Millionaire (1967), Downhill Racer (1969), Pursuit (1972), Extreme Close-Up (1973), The Incredible Shrinking Woman (1981), Assassination (1987), Strategic Command (1997), Austin Powers: International Man of Mystery (1997) and Batman & Robin (1997).

McMullan died of complications from ALS on May 31, 2019 at his home in Wofford Heights, California.

== Filmography ==
- The Alfred Hitchcock Hour (1963) (Season 1 Episode 25: "The Long Silence") - George Cory
- The Raiders (1963) – William F. 'Buffalo Bill' Cody
- Shenandoah (1965) – John Anderson
- The Happiest Millionaire (1967) – Lieutenant Powell
- Downhill Racer (1969) – Creech
- The Windsplitter (1971) – Bobby Joe
- Pursuit (1972, TV Movie) – Lewis
- Extreme Close-Up (1973) – John Norman
- The Incredible Shrinking Woman (1981) – Lyle Parks
- Assassination (1987) – The Zipper
- Life Flight: The Movie (1987) – C.J. Reynolds
- Judicial Consent (1994) – Trenton Clarkson
- Strategic Command (1997) – The President
- Austin Powers: International Man of Mystery (1997) – American UN Representative
- Batman & Robin (1997) – Party Guest
- The Eighteenth Angel (1997) – Priest #4
- Shadow of Doubt (1998) – Moderator Pundit
- The Extreme Adventures of Super Dave (2000) – Surgeon
