= The Raiders (1963 film) =

1963 film by Herschel Daugherty

- Theatrical release poster
- Directed by: Herschel Daugherty
- Written by: Gene L. Coon
- Produced by: Howard Christie
- Starring: Robert Culp; Brian Keith; Judi Meredith; Jim McMullan; Alfred Ryder; Simon Oakland
- Cinematography: Bud Thackery
- Edited by: Gene Palmer
- Music by: Morton Stevens
- Production company: Revue Studios
- Distributed by: Universal Pictures
- Release date: December 1963
- Running time: 75 minutes
- Country: United States
- Language: English

The Raiders is a 1963 American Western film directed by Herschel Daugherty and written by Gene L. Coon. The film stars Brian Keith, Robert Culp, Judi Meredith, Jim McMullan, Alfred Ryder and Simon Oakland. The film's working title was "The Plainsman," and it was apparently intended as a spin-off of that 1936 classic.

The film was produced as a one-hour pilot by Universal's television arm, Revue Studios. When it failed to sell, an additional 25 minutes were shot and it was given a modest second-feature release in December 1963 by Universal Pictures. Although it was filmed in the TV aspect ratio of 1.37:1, theatres ran it in the then-standard flat ratio of 1.85:1, causing some cropping of the image, including the opening credits.

== Plot ==
Shortly after the American Civil War, poverty-stricken Texas cattle-men are confronted by a gun-slinger who has been hired by the US government and a buffalo hunter after they use desperate measures to try and get their grievances addressed by the railroad company.

== Cast ==
- Robert Culp as James Butler 'Wild Bill' Hickok
- Brian Keith as John G. McElroy/Narrator
- Judi Meredith as Martha 'Calamity Jane' Canary
- Jim McMullan as William F. 'Buffalo Bill' Cody
- Alfred Ryder as Capt. Benton
- Simon Oakland as Sgt. Austin Tremaine
- Ben Cooper as Tom King
- Trevor Bardette as 'Uncle Otto' Strassner
- Harry Carey, Jr. as Jellicoe
- Richard H. Cutting as Jack Goodnight
- Addison Richards as Huntington Lawford
- Cliff Osmond as Private Jean Duchamps
- Paul Birch as Paul King
- Richard Deacon as Commissioner Mailer
- Michael Burns as Jimmy McElroy
