= Carol Jean =

General information
- Type: North American B-25 Mitchell
- Manufacturer: North American Aviation
- Status: In storage
- Owners: Smithsonian Institution (1985–present); John Marshall (1979–1985); DVAU Aviation (1971–1979); Tallmantz Aviation (1968–1971); Hemet Valley Flying Service (1965–1967); Louis Parsons (1957–1964); Les Bowman Engineering (1957); United States Army Air Forces/United States Air Forces (1944–1956)
- Registration: N10564
- Serial: 44-29887

History
- Preserved at: Paul E. Garber Preservation, Restoration, and Storage Facility

Carol Jean is a North American B-25 Mitchell that was built in 1944 as a World War II training bomber. After the war, it was used for aerial firefighting by the United States Forest Service and appeared in the 1970 film Catch-22.

The plane went through several private owners before being acquired by Dr. John F. Marshall, who named it after his wife. He transferred the B-25 to the Smithsonian Institution in 1985. Carol Jean is currently stored at the Paul E. Garber Preservation, Restoration, and Storage Facility.

== Early history ==
B-25-J-20NC was produced by North American Aviation in 1944, the 29,887th aircraft ordered by the United States Army Air Forces that year. Eddie Fisher and Paul Thornburg test flew the plane on November 8 before delivery on November 14. Numbered 44-29887, it was used by the Air Education and Training Command as a trainer aircraft. It did not see combat service in World War II.

After the war, the plane remained within the Air Force until November 1957. It was stationed at Lunken Airport with the 586th Army Air Field Base Unit until July 1946, then was transferred to the 1103rd at Morrison Army Airfield followed by the Third Air Force Air Depot in Seattle. It was assigned to Wright-Patterson Air Force Base in 1951. In July 1953, 44-29887 was modified for training purposes by removing the armor plating, updating the instruments and safety equipment, and enlarging the front engine hatch. After the upgrades, the aircraft returned to Wright-Patterson before going to Eglin Air Force Base. Additional repairs and modifications were undertaken in 1956 before being removed from the Air Force's inventory a year later.

In November 1957, it was sold to Les Bowman Engineering for $2,777 and registered as N10564. Louis Parsons, owner of Parsons Airpark in Carpinteria, California, bought the plane in December and partnered with AiResearch Aviation to convert it into an firefighting bomber. It served the Forest Service until four B-25s crashed while fighting forest fires in July 1960, leading to the model being banned from the role.

N10564 "fell into obscurity" afterward. In 1965, Parsons sold the plane to Hemet Valley Flying Service, who stripped the engines for use in a Consolidated PBY Catalina before selling it to Tallmantz Aviation three years later. Tallmantz restored the planes for use in films. It was one of several Mitchells that appear in the 1970 film Catch-22, flying as "Luscious Lulu". The plane had the tail code "6Y" painted on. The woman on the nose art, who wore a red bikini and blue skirt, was nicknamed "Luscious Lucille" as a nod to the movie. The plane first had nose art in 1962 of a blonde pin-up model in a 1940s style. She was originally depicted with a more pronounced figure, but the artist opted for a modest look on religious grounds.

Tallmantz sold the B-25 to DAVU Aviation in 1971, who loaned it to the Wings of Yesterday Museum in Santa Fe, New Mexico.

== John Marshall ==
In November 1979, radiologist John F. Marshall acquired the B-25 from the Wings of Yesterday Museum as it was going out of business. Marshall, who ran the Ocala Radiation Center and owned planes like a Piper J-3 Cub and North American T-6 Texan, proclaimed in 1984 that "some people play golf or sail. I restore World War II vintage aircraft."

The B-25 was also significant to Marshall since it came from a period when Americans "were proud of this country". He hoped showcasing the aircraft would revitalize national pride that had waned during the Vietnam War. Newspaper reports of the plane at air shows likewise commented on how it flying in formation was "enough to sitr a wave of patriotism in even the youngest member of the audience".

While Marshall was its owner, the plane was leased to the Warbird Era Museum in Ocala, Florida. The museum's owner Bob Dugan served as its pilot. Dugan was joined in the cockpit by Marshall as the plane's copilot, the latter's son John D. Marshall, and aircraft maintenance technician Rusty Harper. It was also based at locations like Williston Municipal Airport in Williston, Florida, and the Bass Jet Center in Fairhope, Alabama.

It was renamed Carol Jean after Marshall's wife. The plane underwent an extensive restoration to return to its wartime appearance. The cockpit was stripped down and most of the instruments were replaced, though modern radios remained in use. A Norden bombsight was installed as well as a period-accurate .50-caliber top machine gun turret and functioning bomb bay filled with five dummy bombs. If "minor electrical work" was done and real guns were implemented, it could be fully operational. The Bass Jet Center repainted the livery to closer resemble that of the 486th Bombardment Squadron, 12th Operations Group which served in the North African campaign in 1943.

Carol Jean was flown at air shows around the eastern United States in simulated bombing runs and historical reenactments of events like the Dolittle Raid. Crews on the ground ignited pyrotechnics in tandem to simulate explosions. Marshall and his team also wore authentic flight crew uniforms. In 1982, Carol Jean was used for an anniversary reenactment of the Doolittle Raid at Andrews Air Force Base with President Ronald Reagan in attendance. Marshall flew the plane to each air show, only charging for fuel and lodging. The Press-Register called it the "bomber with a bombshell" gave it nicknames like the "Glamour Girl of the '40s" and "Bomber with a Bombshell".

The plane was also put on display for World War II veterans to visit. Marshall recalled in 1985, "It's a unique experience to see a veteran come up to it and touch it with a long face. People actually went up to the aircraft and cried."

== 1985 Kentucky–Florida game ==
By 1985, Carol Jean was one of approximately 20 airworthy Mitchells in the United States. The Smithsonian Institution offered to buy it from Marshall for about $250,000. Tim Woolridge, the chairman of the Smithsonian's aeronautics department, explained the museum had "long been searching for a B-25" because it was the "perfect representative of the most well-known medium-sized bomber of World War II". Marshall, who lacked the time and resources to maintain it, agreed to hand over the plane as part of a permanent exhibition at a new museum at Dulles International Airport.

As a "last hurrah" before the plane changed owners, Marshall conducted a flight around the country on November 16. During the flight, he made a pass over Florida Field in Gainesville, where a college football game between the visiting Kentucky Wildcats and host Florida Gators was taking place.

The B-25 flew across the length of the playing field during the first quarter, so low that that Florida head coach Galen Hall joked it could have "pick[ed] off some of our passes". The game broadcast also quipped "we could've talked to that guy personally" with how low Marshall was flying. Florida won 15–13.

Fred Williams, a Federal Aviation Administration airworthiness inspector in Jacksonville, received angry calls from locals for two and a half hours. FAA spokesman Jack Barker commended Marshall's altruism for donating the plane, but added it did not "mitigate the violation" he committed.

Marshall assured he had "no malicious intent" and stressed he was high enough to avoid hitting power lines and flag poles. Still, he acknowledged he violated FAA rules mandating a minimum altitude of 1,000 feet while going over crowds. Woolridge was dismayed by Marshall's actions but accepted the plane for the Smithsonian.

== Smithsonian ==
Marshall landed the plane at Dulles on November 18, after which it was brought into Smithsonian custody. It was dismantled and placed in storage next to Space Shuttle Enterprise until the Steven F. Udvar-Hazy Center opened.

== See also ==
- List of surviving North American B-25 Mitchells
- B-25 Mitchell aircraft in Catch-22
