= Barbarosa =

1982 American Western film by Fred Schepisi

- Theatrical poster
- Directed by: Fred Schepisi
- Written by: William D. Wittliff
- Produced by: Paul N. Lazarus III
- Starring: Willie Nelson; Gary Busey
- Cinematography: Ian Baker
- Edited by: David Ramirez; Don Zimmerman
- Music by: Bruce Smeaton
- Production company: ITC Entertainment
- Distributed by: Universal Pictures; Associated Film Distribution
- Release date: February 19, 1982
- Running time: 90 minutes
- Country: United States
- Language: English
- Budget: $10-12 million
- Box office: $1,736,123

Barbarosa is a 1982 American Western film starring Willie Nelson and Gary Busey. It is about a young cowboy on the run from the law who partners with a famous "bandido" and learns about life from him. Barbarosa was the first American-made film by the Australian director Fred Schepisi.

== Plot ==
Karl Westover, a post-Civil War Texas farm boy, accidentally kills his brother-in-law and flees to Mexico. He is met by the outlaw Barbarosa. Barbarosa takes pity on Karl and shows him how to live as an outlaw adventurer. Karl and Barbarosa ride together for the winter.

Karl is being pursued by Floyd and Otto Pahmeyer, the brothers of the man he killed, sent by their vengeful father. Karl and Barbarosa get the drop on them. To Barbarosa's disgust, Karl tells them to go home. They say they cannot, being afraid of their father. They hike off to replace their guns and resume the chase.

Karl and Barbarosa are captured by the outlaw Angel Morales and his gang. Angel's parents arrive in camp and recount to Angel that Barbarosa tried to rob them, but Karl wanted to spare them. The enraged Angel shoots Barbarosa in the belly. He spares Karl for restraining Barbarosa, but sets him to digging Barbarosa's grave. Barbarosa is still alive and scuttles off when no one is looking. Karl fills in the empty grave. Angel's gang capture Floyd and Otto, and Angel shoots them on a whim, again setting Karl to dig the graves. That night, Barbosa and Karl escape, leaving Angel buried up to the neck beside Floyd and Otto.

Barbarosa brings his accumulated loot every few months when he visits his loyal wife, Josefina de Zavala, who lives at the hacienda of her father, Don Braulio Zavala. Don Braulio hates Barbarosa for crippling him and killing his son in a drunken fracas, and every few years he sends another young Zavala to kill Barbarosa. Don Braulio's tales, stylized and heavy with symbolism, spur the young Zavalas to their best efforts to be worthy of such an adversary, and the Zavalas have become rich and powerful thereby. The songs recounting Barbarosa's exploits become longer and more celebratory each year, and recent verses also mention Barbarosa's new sidekick, the "Gringo Child."

Barbarosa and Josefina's daughter, Juanita, hides Karl from searchers in her bed. Interrupted by her parents, Karl is kicked into the plaza by the enraged Barbarosa; the ruckus raises Don Braulio and the household, who rush to the plaza, guns blazing. Barbarosa and Karl escape on horseback amid a hail of bloodless gun play. Karl tells Barbarosa that he liked Juanita and intends to visit her again. Barbarosa smiles and says that is fine with him.

In the spring, Barbarosa and Karl return to the Texas Hill Country and the German immigrant colony where Karl grew up, and ride into a stockmen's rendezvous. While they are enjoying eating barbecue and watching horse races, the elder Pahmeyer arrives, still seeking to kill Karl. Karl covers him with his revolver and orders him to return home. Karl buys some broncos to take home to his father's farm, but Barbarosa declines to accompany him back to lawful living. The two part ways as friends.

Karl finds his father's farm very run down, his mother dead, himself given up for dead, and his father, Emile and his sister Hilda, despondent. He cheers them up. Next morning Pahmeyer takes another potshot from the woods, again missing Karl but killing his father. Karl goes alone to the Pahmeyer farmhouse, offering to end the feud. But despite the cries of his wife, Pahmeyer charges out the door with his gun. Karl kills him to defend himself.

Years later, Karl and Barbarosa reunite. During a brief split, Karl aids Barbarosa in evading Eduardo Zavala, another would-be killer sent by Don Braulio. Without Barbarosa's knowledge, he disarms Eduardo and strips him of his guns, horse, and boots. Eduardo hones his silver crucifix down to a dagger point, wraps his feet in rawhide thongs, and stalks Barbarosa on foot. He leaps upon Barbarosa from ambush, stabs him in the belly, and flees to the south. As Karl sits with the dying Barbarosa, Barbarosa laments that Eduardo will tell everyone that he is dead because this will end the legend.

Karl cremates Barbarosa, and pursues Eduardo. Eduardo knocks Karl out with a branch. Taking Karl's horse, Eduardo makes it back to the hacienda and is greeted as a hero. A fiesta is held in his honor. But the clan is despondent, dancing while contemplating directionless life without a Barbarosa to fight. Karl rides in on Barbarosa's Appaloosa, wearing Barbarosa's sombrero and a red beard, whooping and shooting. As Eduardo is being presented a black wreath of honor, Karl aims and shoots the wreath. The Zavalas shout, "Barbarosa! Barbarosa!" and scramble for their guns and knives.

== Cast ==
- Willie Nelson as Barbarosa
- Gary Busey as Karl Westover
- Gilbert Roland as Don Braulio Zavala
- Isela Vega as Josephina
- Danny De La Paz as Eduardo
- Alma Martinez as Juanita
- George Voskovec as Herman Pahmeyer
- Sharon Compton as Hilda
- Howland Chamberlain as Emile
- Harry Caesar as Sims
- Wolf Muser as Floyd
- Kai Wulff as Otto
- Roberto Contreras as Cantina Owner
- Luis Contreras as Angel Morales
- Itasco Wilson as Mattie
- Bruce Smith as Photographer
- Sonia de León as Old Prostitute
- Joanelle Romero as Young Prostitute
- Michael S. O'Rourke as Brither (credited as Michael O'Rourke)
- Bentley H. Garrett as The Bartender
- Allison Wittliff as Emily
- Juan José Martínez as 1st Boy (credited as Juan Jose Martinez)
- Rene Luna as 2nd Boy (credited as Rene Luna)
- Christoper García as 3rd Boy
- Philip Pena as 4th Boy (credited as Philip Peña)
- Jake Busey as Cook Boy
- Reid Wittliff as Cook Boy
- Bill Couch as Stunt Double
- Chuck Couch as Stunt Double

== Reception ==
The film received critical acclaim. It has a 100% rating on review aggregator website Rotten Tomatoes based on five reviews, with an average rating of 7.9/10. In a contemporary review, Pauline Kael called it "spirited and satisfying", and offered particular praise for Willie Nelson's unexpectedly "great screen presence". On the television show Sneak Previews, Gene Siskel and Roger Ebert gave it two "Yes" votes. Ebert called it "a strange and wonderful western with a sly, outrageous sense of humor", Siskel was impressed at how Fred Schepisi brought the territory of the West to life, and both of them praised Willie Nelson's performance and the interesting characters.
