= Strategic Command (film) =

- Directed by: Rick Jacobson
- Screenplay by: Sean McGinly; Tripp Reed
- Produced by: Alan B. Bursteen
- Starring: Michael Dudikoff; Amanda Wyss; Richard Norton; Paul Winfield; Bryan Cranston; Stephen Quadros
- Cinematography: Gary Graver
- Edited by: Barry Zetlin
- Music by: David Wurst; Eric Wurst
- Distributed by: Cabin Fever Entertainment
- Release date: 1997
- Running time: 90 minutes
- Country: United States
- Language: English

Strategic Command is a 1997 action drama film directed by Rick Jacobson. Michael Dudikoff leads the cast. Warren Burton and Jim McMullan have supporting roles.

== Plot ==
Rick Harding (Michael Dudikoff) is a former US Marine officer, now working as biological weapons scientist for the FBI. Harding's lab is infiltrated, which results in terrorists getting their hands on a deadly nerve agent, Bromax 365. Led by Carlos Gruber (Richard Norton), the terrorists hijack Air Force Two, the aircraft of the vice president), a Boeing VC-25 en route from Los Angeles to Washington, D.C. Harding must participate in a midair effort to retake the plane and save his wife and the vice President.

== Cast ==
- Michael Dudikoff as Dr. Rick Harding
- Paul Winfield as Rowan
- Richard Norton as Carlos Gruber
- Amanda Wyss as Michelle Harding
- Nick Corr as Captain Rattner
- Stephen Quadros as Vlos
- Bryan Cranston as Phil Hertzberg
- Michael Cavanaugh as Vice President Charles Baker
- Warren Burton as Colpart
- Jim McMullan as The President

== Production and reception ==
The aircraft pictured in this film features the prototype Boeing 747 (in its red and black livery) and the Lockheed SR-71 Blackbird, changes from the original 1996 source film Executive Decision, which shows an Oceanic Airlines 747 and the Lockheed F-117 Nighthawk, respectively.
