= Paul N. Lazarus III =

American film producer (1938–2026)

Paul N. Lazarus III (May 25, 1938 – September 30, 2026) was an American film producer.

== Life and career ==
In the 1960s, he was an agent, his clients including Woody Allen. He ran his own production company and became chief of production for the film division of HBO. He spent a year as director of the New Mexico Film Commission then went to work for the University of Miami.

In 1985, he published a book The Film Producer: A Handbook for Producing.

Lazarus died on September 30, 2026, at the age of 88.

== Select filmography ==
- The Cell: Part One (1971) (documentary short) – executive producer
- Westworld (1973) – producer
- Extreme Close-Up (1973) – producer
- Young Marriage (1973) (short) – executive producer
- But Jack Was a Good Driver (1974) (short) – executive producer
- Futureworld (1976) – producer
- Capricorn One (1977) – producer
- Hanover Street (1979) – producer
- Barbarosa (1982) – producer
- Gringo Wedding (2006) – executive producer
