= List of surviving North American B-25 Mitchells =

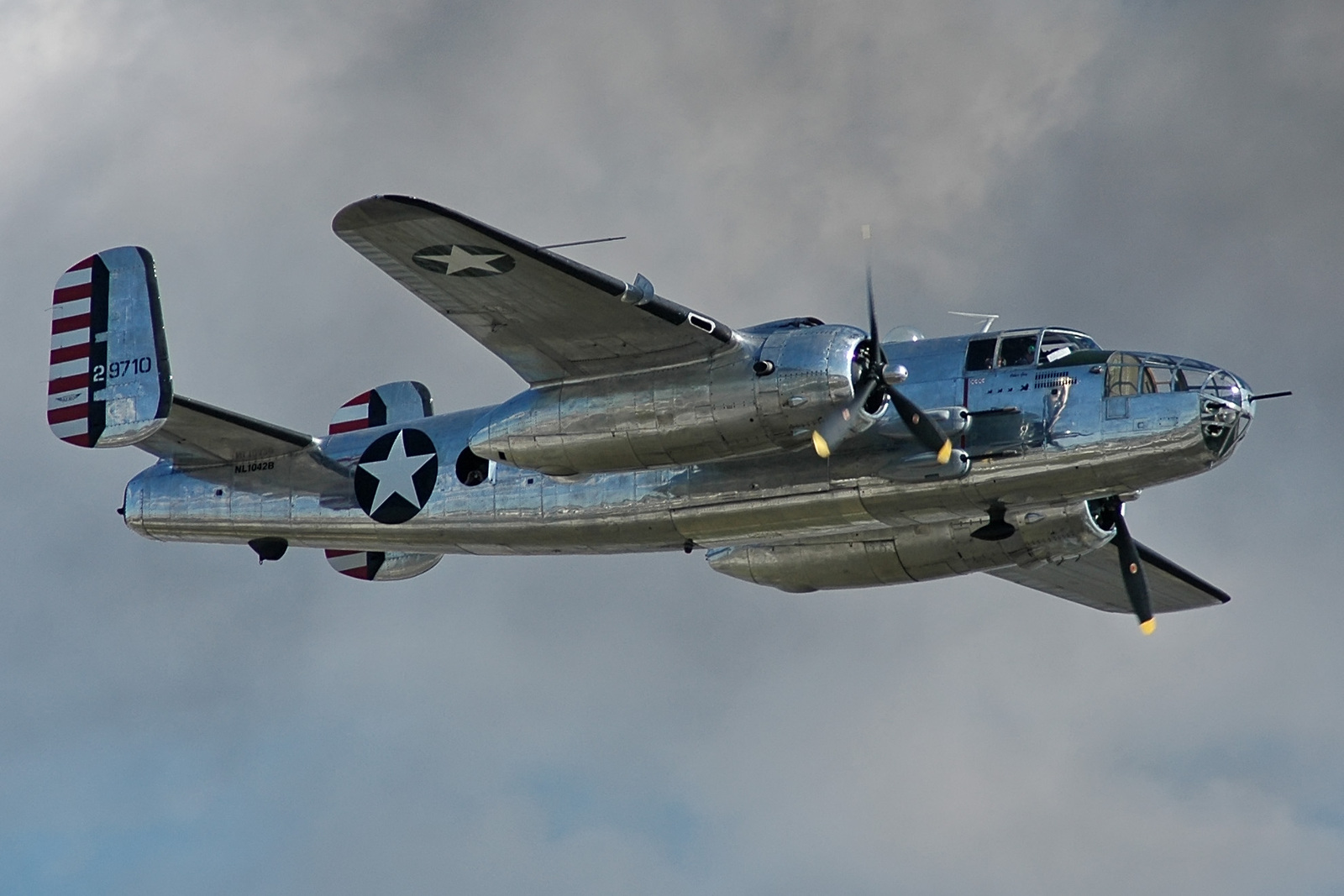
The Vintage Flying Museum's B-25J, Pacific Prowler

There are more than one hundred surviving North American B-25 Mitchells scattered over the world, mainly in the United States. Most of them are on static display in museums, but about 45 are still airworthy.

A significant number of these were brought together for Catch-22, a 1970 war film adapted from the book of the same name by Joseph Heller. When Catch-22 began preliminary production, Paramount hired the Tallmantz Aviation organization to obtain available B-25s. Tallmantz president, Frank G. Tallman ended up finding war-surplus aircraft, and eventually gathered not only pilots to fly the aircraft but also a ground support crew to maintain the fleet.

On 18 April 2010, 17 airworthy B-25s took off from the airfield behind the National Museum of the United States Air Force and flew over in formation to commemorate the 68th anniversary of the Doolittle Raid.

== Surviving aircraft ==
Serial Number	Name	Model	Location	Status	Image	Notes
44-31173	Huaira Bajo	B-25J-30-NC	Argentina	Under restoration		Restoration to airworthiness
41-30222	Hawg-Mouth	B-25D-10-NC	Australia	On display		Displayed at Darwin Aviation Museum
41-12913	Unnamed	B-25C-NA	Australia	Under restoration		Partially stored at Darwin Aviation Museum
41-12924	Unnamed	B-25C-NA	Australia	Under restoration		Partially stored at Darwin Aviation Museum
44-31508	Lucky Lady	B-25J-30-NC	Australia	Under restoration		
44-86893	Red Bull	B-25J-35-NC	Austria	Airworthy		Flown for the Flying Bulls/Red Bull
44-30925		B-25J / TB-25N	Belgium	Under restoration		Restoration to static display
44-29500	Unnamed	B-25J-20-NC	Brazil	On display		
44-30069	Unnamed	B-25J-25-NC	Brazil	On display		
44-30245	Unnamed	B-25J-25-NC	Brazil	On display		
45-8883	Hot Gen! (formerly Grumpy)	B-25J-35-NC	Canada	Airworthy		
44-30791		B-25J	Canada	On display		Converted to B-25D during restoration
44-86699	Unnamed	B-25J	Canada	On display		
44-86724	Unnamed	B-25J	Canada	On display		
44-86726	Unnamed	B-25J	Canada	In storage		Unrestored in original RCAF scheme
44-86866	Apache Princess	B-25J	Ecuador	On display		
45-8811	Russell's Raiders	B-25J	France	In storage		Crashed in 2011, damaged beyond economical repair
44-29022	Unnamed	B-25J	Indonesia	On display		
44-29023	Unnamed	B-25J-15-NC	Indonesia	On display		
44-29032	Unnamed	B-25J-15-NC	Indonesia	On display		
44-30399	Unnamed	B-25J	Indonesia	On display		
44-29128	Unnamed	B-25J-20-NC	Mexico	On display		
44-29145	Unnamed	B-25J-20-NC	Mexico	Under restoration		
44-30692	Unnamed	B-25J	Mexico	Under restoration		
44-29507	Sarinah	B-25J-20-NC	Netherlands	Airworthy		
41-30792	Unnamed	B-25D-15-NC	Netherlands	On display		
44-31258	Unnamed	B-25J-30-NC	Netherlands	On display		
41-12442	Miss Priority	B-25C-NA	Papua New Guinea	On display		Unrestored
41-12830	Pistoff	B-25C-NA	Papua New Guinea	On display		Unrestored, underwater wreck
43-3355	Unnamed	B-25D-30-NC	Russia	On display		
44-29121	Unnamed	B-25J-20-NC	Spain	On display		
44-29366	Unnamed	B-25J-20-NC	United Kingdom	On display		
44-31171	Unnamed	B-25J	United Kingdom	On display		Painted as USMC PBJ despite never serving in the Marine Corps
44-30861	Unnamed	B-25J-25-NC	United Kingdom	Under restoration		Restoration to static display
40-2168	Miss Hap	B-25-NA	United States	Airworthy		
43-3318	Grumpy	B-25D-30-NC	United States	Airworthy		
43-3634	Rosie's Reply	B-25D-35-NC	United States	Airworthy		
43-4106	Barbie III	B-25H-1-NA	United States	Airworthy		
43-4432	Berlin Express	B-25H-5-NA	United States	Airworthy		Name only coined for 1970 film Catch 22
43-27868	Yellow Rose	B-25J-5-NC	United States	Airworthy		
43-28059	Apache Princess	B-25J-5-NC	United States	Airworthy		
43-28204	Pacific Princess	B-25J-10-NC	United States	Airworthy		
43-35972	Maid in the Shade	B-25J-10-NC	United States	Airworthy		
44-28866	Champaign Gal	B-25J-15-NC	United States	Airworthy		
44-28925	How 'Boot That!?	B-25J-15-NC	United States	On display		Airworthy, but considered "too valuable to fly"
44-28932	Tondelayo	B-25J-15-NC	United States	Airworthy		
44-28938	Old Glory	B-25J-15-NC	United States	Under restoration		Crash-landed in 2020, restoration to airworthiness
44-29199	In the Mood	B-25J-20-NC	United States	Airworthy		
44-29465	Guardian of Freedom	B-25J-20-NC	United States	Airworthy		
44-29869	Miss Mitchell	B-25J-20-NC	United States	Airworthy		
44-29939	Briefing Time	B-25J-25-NC	United States	Airworthy		
44-30129	Wild Cargo	B-25J-25-NC	United States	Airworthy		
44-30254	Dam Buster 810	B-25J-25-NC	United States	Airworthy		
44-30423	Photo Fanny	B-25J-25-NC	United States	Airworthy		
44-30456	Russian Ta Get Ya	B-25J-25-NC	United States	Airworthy		
44-30606	Tootsie	B-25J-25-NC	United States	Airworthy		
44-30734	Panchito	B-25J-25-NC	United States	Airworthy		
44-30748	Heavenly Body	B-25J-25-NC	United States	Airworthy		
44-30801	Executive Sweet	B-25J-25-NC	United States	Airworthy		
44-30823	God and Country	B-25J-25-NC	United States	Airworthy		
44-30832	Take-off Time	B-25J-25-NC	United States	Airworthy		
44-31385	Show Me	B-25J-30-NC	United States	Airworthy		
44-86697	Killer B	B-25J-30-NC	United States	Airworthy		
44-86698	Paper Doll	B-25J-30-NC	United States	Airworthy		
44-86725	Super Rabbit	B-25J-30-NC	United States	Airworthy		
44-86734	Special Delivery	B-25J-30-NC	United States	Airworthy		
44-86747	Mitch the Witch II	B-25J-30-NC	United States	Airworthy		
44-86758	Devil Dog	B-25J-30-NC	United States	Airworthy		
44-86777	Georgie's Gal	B-25J-30-NC	United States	Airworthy		
44-86785	Georgia Mae	B-25J-30-NC	United States	Airworthy		
44-86791	Mitchell III	B-25J-30-NC	United States	Airworthy		
44-86797	Sweet Dreams	B-25J-30-NC	United States	Airworthy		
45-8835	Betty's Dream	B-25J-35-NC	United States	Airworthy		
45-8884	Lady Luck	B-25J-35-NC	United States	Airworthy		
45-8898	Axis Nightmare	B-25J-35-NC	United States	Airworthy		
44-30988	Semper Fi	B-25J-30-NC	United States	Airworthy		Only known surviving PBJ-1J
41-12634	Unnamed	B-25C-NA	United States	On display		
41-29784	Furtle Turtle	B-25D-NC	United States	On display		
43-3308	Unnamed	B-25D-30-NC	United States	On display		
43-3374	Unnamed	B-25/F-10-NC	United States	On display		
43-4899	Betty's Dream	B-25H-10-NA	United States	On display		
43-4999	Dog Daize	B-25H-10-NC	United States	On display		
43-4030	Unnamed	B-25J-1-NC	United States	On display		General Eisenhower's personal transport
43-27712	The Spirit of Al Penn	B-25J-1-NC	United States	On display		Named in honor of museum volunteer killed in car accident
43-28222	Unnamed	B-25J-10-NC	United States	On display		
44-28834	Flo	B-25J-15-NC	United States	On display		Restored to resemble B-25 43-27889 "Flo"
44-28875	Unnamed	B-25J-15-NC	United States	On display		
44-29035	Unnamed	B-25J-15-NC	United States	On display		
44-29812	Unnamed	B-25J-20-NC	United States	On display		Weaponry and parts contributed to restoration of B-25 44-29869 "Miss Mitchell"
44-29835	Unnamed	B-25J-20-NC	United States	On display		
44-30077	Unnamed	B-25J-25-NC	United States	On display		
44-30243	Unnamed	B-25J-25-NC	United States	On display		
44-30363	Unnamed	B-25J-25-NC	United States	On display		
44-30444	Unnamed	B-25J-25-NC	United States	On display		
44-30493	Unnamed	B-25J-25-NC	United States	On display		
44-30535	Iron Laiden Maiden	B-25J-25-NC	United States	On display		
44-30649	Poopsie	B-25J	United States	On display		
44-30854	Unnamed	B-25J	United States	On display		
44-31004	Mary Alice II	B-25J-30-NC	United States	On display		
44-31032	Problem Child	B-25J	United States	On display		
44-86772	Unnamed	B-25J-32-NA	United States	On display		
44-86843	Passionette Paulette	B-25J	United States	On display		
44-86872	The Little King	B-25J	United States	On display		
44-86880	Unnamed	B-25J	United States	On display		
44-86891	Lazy Daisy Mae	B-25J	United States	On display		
40-2347	Unnamed	B-25B-NA	United States	In storage		Unrestored
41-13251	Unnamed	B-25C-1-NA	United States	Under restoration		Restoration to airworthiness
41-13285	GF2	B-25C-1-NA	United States	Under restoration		Restoration to static display, also referred to as "Skunkie"
42-32354	Unnamed	B-25C-10-NA	United States	In storage		Unrestored
44-29877	Carol Jean	B-25J	United States	In storage		
44-29943	Unnamed	B-25J-25-NC	United States	In storage		
44-30203	Unnamed	B-25J-25-NC	United States	Under restoration		
44-30210	Unnamed	B-25J-25-NC	United States	Under restoration		Restoration to airworthiness
44-30324	Unnamed	B-25J-25-NC	United States	Under restoration		
44-30627	Unnamed	B-25J	United States	In storage		
44-30733	Sandbar Mitchell	B-25J-25-NC	United States	Under restoration		Restoration to airworthiness
44-30756	Unnamed	B-25J	United States	In storage		
44-30761	Unnamed	B-25J	United States	Under restoration		
44-86715	Unnamed	B-25J	United States	Under restoration		
44-86727	Unnamed	B-25J	United States	Under restoration		Displayed as PBJ-1J
44-86844	Unnamed	B-25J	United States	In storage		
45-8887	Ah'm Available Too	B-25J	United States	In storage		
44-30010	Unnamed	B-25J-25-NC	United States	On display		
44-30635	Whiskey Pete	B-25J	United States	On display		
43-28096	Unnamed	B-25J	Venezuela	On display		
44-30631	Unnamed	B-25J	Venezuela	On display		

== See also ==
- List of bomber aircraft
- List of military aircraft of the United States
