= Beyond Westworld =

Television series

- Title card
- Based on: Westworld by Michael Crichton
- Developed by: Lou Shaw
- Starring: Jim McMullan; James Wainwright; Connie Sellecca
- Composer: George Romanis
- Country of origin: United States
- Original language: English
- No. of episodes: 5 (2 originally unaired)

Production
- Executive producer: Lou Shaw
- Running time: 60 minutes
- Production companies: Lou Shaw Productions; MGM Television

Original release
- Network: CBS
- Release: March 5 – March 19, 1980

Beyond Westworld is a 1980 American television series based on the 1973 film Westworld, which was written and directed by Michael Crichton. Although the DVD box cover mentions that it follows the film's events, it ignored the 1976 film sequel Futureworld.

== Synopsis ==
Security Chief John Moore of the Delos Corporation has to stop the evil scientist Simon Quaid, who is planning to use the robots in Delos to try to take over the world.

== Cast ==
- Jim McMullan as John Moore
- James Wainwright as Simon Quaid
- Connie Sellecca as Pamela Williams
- William Jordan as Joseph Oppenheimer
- Severn Darden as Foley
- Nancy Harewood as Roberta
- Judith Chapman as Laura Garvey (pilot only)

== Broadcast and reception ==
The series was nominated for two Primetime Emmy Awards (Outstanding Achievement in Makeup and Outstanding Art Direction For a Series), though only five episodes were produced. Only three of these episodes aired by CBS before cancellation.

In the United Kingdom all five episodes were shown by some ITV regions separately, starting with Granada Television, which aired the first four episodes between August 2 and 23, 1980 in an early-evening slot, but delayed the fifth until a morning slot on January 7, 1981. Across the nine regions which showed the "full" series, many showed episodes 2–5 in differing random orders, and only Yorkshire Television showed them more than once. Ulster Television only showed two episodes, six months apart. Thames Television aired all five episodes in an early afternoon slot during the summer of 1982.

== Home media ==
On July 29, 2014, Warner Home Video released the complete series on DVD-R in Region 1 via their Warner Archive Collection manufactured-on-demand service.

== Episodes ==
| No. | Title | Directed by | Written by | Original release date |
|---|---|---|---|---|
| 1 | "Westworld Destroyed" | Ted Post | Lou Shaw | March 5, 1980 |
John Moore is assigned to hunt down Simon Quaid, who has some androids that he proposes to use to further his own ends. The first one is hiding amongst the crew of a U.S. nuclear submarine.
| 2 | "My Brother's Keeper" | Rob Holcomb | Lou Shaw & Haward Dimsdale | March 12, 1980 |
Quaid blackmails the owner of an oil company and John and Pamela must find the android in the company's ranks.
| 3 | "Sound of Terror" | Paul Stanley | Martin Roth | March 19, 1980 |
Quaid gets his hands on some uranium and John and Pamela must find another android who is hiding in a rock band.
| 4 | "The Lion" | Jack Starrett | Martin Roth and David Bennett Carren | August 23, 1980 |
Delos circuitry is found in a car explosion and John and the rest of the Delos team must try and work out Quaid's new plan.
| 5 | "Takeover" | Don Weis | Gregory S. Dinallo and Steven Greenberg and Aubrey Solomon | January 7, 1981 |
Quaid's target is the police officer in charge of the state governor's visit. John and Pamela must stop Quaid and identify the police officer, who is actually an android.

== Awards and nominations ==
| Year | Award | Category | Nominee(s) | Result |
|---|---|---|---|---|
| 1980 | Primetime Creative Arts Emmy Awards | Outstanding Achievement in Makeup | Beyond Westworld | Nominated |
| 1980 | Primetime Creative Arts Emmy Awards | Outstanding Art Direction For a Series | Beyond Westworld | Nominated |
