= Frank Tallman =

American aviator (1919–1978)

- Born: April 17, 1919; East Orange, New Jersey
- Died: April 15, 1978 (aged 58); Santiago Peak, Trabuco Canyon, California
- Occupation: Stunt pilot

Frank Gifford Tallman III (April 17, 1919 – April 15, 1978) was a stunt pilot who worked in Hollywood during the 1960s and 1970s. He was the son of Frank Gifford Tallman, Jr. (1894 – 1952) and Inez Evelyn Foster (1894 – 1982).

== Early life ==
Tallman had a twin sister named Elizabeth. When Elizabeth was about 7, she died of a combination of pneumonia and measles. That same year, Frank's sister Prudence was born. He also had one brother, Foster. Frank Tallman's father had been a military pilot during World War I. Tallman took his first plane ride in his father's lap at the age of five. As a teenager, he took flying lessons and became a pilot. When World War II started, Tallman tried to enter the military as a pilot, but his application was declined due to his lack of the required two years of college. He worked for a time as a civilian pilot instructor and later in the war was able to join the U.S. Navy when they relaxed their education requirements. Tallman remained stateside until the end of the war.

== Postwar ==
Tallman remained in the United States Navy Reserve after the war and started a business in Illinois. He acquired a collection of pre-1920 aircraft and supplemented the collection with surplus World War II aircraft and more pre-war aircraft as he was able.

In the late 1950s, he moved his business and aircraft to southern California and began to do work for the entertainment business. He also performed in air shows around the country.

== Tallmantz Aviation ==
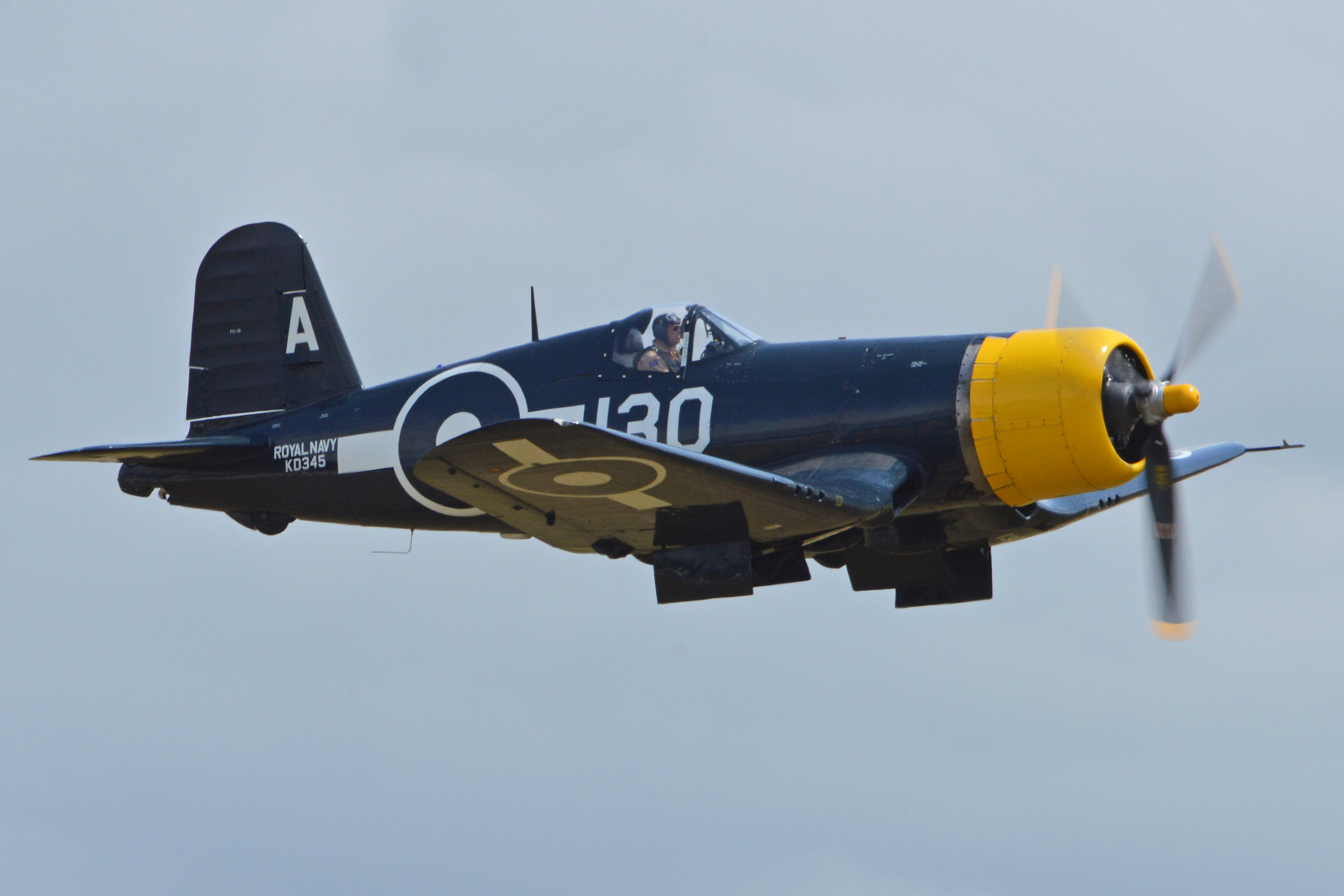
A FG-1D Corsair that was formerly owned by Tallman. He acquired the aircraft in 1959 from the salvage yard of an aluminium smelting company.

In 1961, Tallman formed Tallmantz Aviation with stunt pilot Paul Mantz. Based at Orange County Airport (now John Wayne Airport) in southern California, they provided pilots, camera planes, and a small fleet of antique and historic aircraft, along with background models of aircraft and ships, for movie and television productions. Mantz was killed in 1965 while flying a cobbled-together aircraft, the Tallmantz Phoenix P-1, designed with the assistance of Otto Timm, representing the fictional type built by oil explorers of pieces of their crashed Fairchild C-82 Packet downed in the North African desert in The Flight of the Phoenix (1965).

Tallman injured his leg in a go-cart accident with his small son in the driveway of their home, which meant Mantz had to fly the Phoenix. Tallman was hospitalized. Infection set in and most of the leg was amputated. Tallman taught himself to fly with one leg, reportedly preferring to fly some planes without the prosthetic leg he used for walking. As an amputee, he eventually regained his airman medical certificate and ratings in propeller multi- and single-engine, jet, and rotary aircraft.

== Film credits ==
Tallman performed the stunt flying in the 1963 chase movie It's a Mad, Mad, Mad, Mad World, including the flight in a Beechcraft Model 18 through a Coca-Cola billboard. He also contributed to The Carpetbaggers (1964), The Wrecking Crew (1969), and The Thousand Plane Raid (also 1969).

He served as the flying supervisor for Catch-22 in 1970 and was personally involved in locating and acquiring the 18 or so flyable film unit B-25s appearing in the film. Tallman flew the dramatic night shots of the Milo Minderbinder Air Force B-25 bombing its own base just over the heads of actors Jon Voight and Martin Sheen.

In 1971, Tallman flew a Grumman J2F-6 Duck amphibian he restored in Murphy's War. Also in 1971, Tallmantz Aviation provided the aerial camera footage for an episode of Columbo entitled "Ransom For A Dead Man". In 1973, he flew in Ace Eli and Rodger of the Skies and piloted a Stearman cropduster in Charley Varrick along with the television pilot films Death Race and San Francisco International Airport. He was aerial supervisor for The Great Waldo Pepper in which he performed barnstorming stunts. When the controls failed in his World War I aircraft replica, the plane went out of control and struck power lines. Tallman suffered a head injury. He also flew in Lucky Lady in 1975. Tallman served as aerial coordinator and pilot for the television series Baa Baa Black Sheep (1976–1979). He also flew in the six-episode TV series Spencer's Pilots, starring Gene Evans, and the television film, Amelia Earhart, both in 1976.

In 1973, Tallman recounted his experiences rebuilding and flying vintage aircraft in the book Flying the Old Planes.

His last film projects were The Cat from Outer Space, Capricorn One, and 1941, all in 1978.

== Death ==
On Saturday, April 15, 1978, Tallman was making a routine ferry flight in a twin-engine Piper Aztec from Santa Monica Airport, California, to Phoenix, Arizona under visual flight rules when he continued the flight into deteriorating weather, a lowering ceiling and rain. He struck the side of Santiago Peak in the Santa Ana Mountains near Trabuco Canyon at cruising altitude, and died in the ensuing crash.

Following Tallman's death, his historic collection of movie warplanes and camera planes was sold. Many were purchased by entrepreneur Kermit Weeks and went on display at his Fantasy of Flight museum in Polk City, Florida. A Silver Line ship's model was donated to the Los Angeles Maritime Museum.

He was survived by his second wife, "Boots," and children Gail and Frank.

== See also ==
- B-25 Mitchell aircraft in Catch-22
