= Gene Polito =

American cinematographer

- Born: Eugene Emmanuel Polito; September 13, 1918; Brooklyn, New York, United States
- Died: November 28, 2010 (aged 92); Irvine, California, United States
- Occupation: Cinematographer
- Parent(s): Sol Polito; Frances Polito

Eugene Emmanuel Polito (September 13, 1918 – November 28, 2010) was an American cinematographer, mechanical engineer and academic. His numerous film and television credits included Futureworld, Up in Smoke and Lost in Space.

== Biography ==
Polito was born in Brooklyn, New York, in 1918, the son of cinematographer Sol Polito and his wife, Frances Polito. Polito was just eight months old when his family moved to Los Angeles in 1919 so his father, Sol Polito, could continue working at Warner Brothers Studios.

Polito graduated from Loyola High School in Los Angeles. He attended Loyola University (now Loyola Marymount University), before earning his bachelor's degree in mechanical engineering from the University of Southern California. Polito was employed as an engineer for aerospace manufacturer, Douglas Aircraft Company, during World War II.

Polito began his career as a cinematographer towards the end of World War II. His career ultimately spanned more than forty years and included hundreds of film and television productions. A member of the American Society of Cinematographers, Polito is credited with the invention of the "Polito Bracket," which film studio photographers now use as a mounting accessory for Reflectors and Bead Board. Polito became a professor at the USC School of Cinematic Arts when he was 62 years old.

== Death ==
Polito died at his home in Irvine, California, on November 28, 2010, aged 92, following a three-year battle with esophageal cancer. He was survived by his wife, Lucy, to whom he had been married for 66 years, as well as nine children, a brother and nine great-grandchildren.
