= Children of the Storm =

Book by Barbara Mertz

- First edition cover for Children of the Storm
- Author: Elizabeth Peters
- Audio read by: Barbara Rosenblat
- Language: English
- Series: Amelia Peabody series mysteries
- Genre: Historical mystery
- Publisher: William Morrow
- Publication date: 2003
- Publication place: United States
- Media type: Print (hardback & paperback)
- Pages: xv, 400
- ISBN: 0-06-621476-9
- OCLC: 51042729
- Dewey Decimal: 813/.54 21
- LC Class: PS3563.E747 C48 2003
- Preceded by: The Golden One
- Followed by: The Serpent on the Crown

Children of the Storm is the 15th in a series of historical mystery novels, written by American writer Elizabeth Peters, first published in 2003. The audiobook is narrated by British actress Barbara Rosenblat.

Children of the Storm features fictional sleuth and archaeologist Amelia Peabody. The story is set in the 1919–1920 dig season in Egypt.

== Explanation of the novel's title ==
The title is an excerpt from an ancient Egyptian horoscope:

"The day of the children of the storm. Very dangerous. Do not go on the water this day."

—Ancient Egyptian horoscope

Epigraph of Children of the Storm

== Plot summary ==
The 1919 season opens with the Vandergelts and Emersons packing the God's Wives treasures found (in the previous book) for Cyrus Vandergelt by his adopted son Bertie. Just after the Service d'Antiquités representative comes to inspect their work, several items disappear together with the conservator Cyrus had hired on Sethos's recommendation. The conservator's skeleton is found later in the desert, without the objects. These events coincide with a visit from Emerson's brother Walter, his wife Evelyn, their daughter Lia and her husband David (the Emersons' adoptive son), plus their small children Dolly and Evvie. Ramses and Nefret have two-year-old twins, Davy and Charla.

The Emersons meet up with Justin Fitzroyce, a young person with a strange mental malady, and his companion, François, who quickly develops a dislike of the family after Ramses mistakes his attentions to the boy for physical abuse. Justin is travelling with his grandmother, the elderly, sometimes confused, Mrs Fitzroyce aboard an expensive dahabeah called Isis; also with them is her companion, who turns out to be Maryam, the teenage daughter of Sethos, fallen on hard times. Amelia befriends Maryam and helps her to rebuild her relationship with her father when he arrives to visit. She reassures Maryam that the Emersons were not responsible for the death of the girl's mother, Bertha.

Along the way, the Emerson family is dogged by a series of mysterious events ranging from strange pranks to near-fatal accidents. Most of these seem to be directed at the Arab servants, including Selim, who is badly injured when a motor-car imported by Emerson crashes as a result of the wheel-nuts having been removed. The exception is a mystery attacker who targets Maryam. In addition, Ramses is temporarily taken prisoner and drugged by a mysterious woman disguised as the goddess Hathor. The same woman later reappears at the temple ruins during the night but the Emersons fail to apprehend her.

As the head of the Service arrives to take possession of the treasure for transport to Cairo, Nefret is captured by the criminal gang intent on stealing the treasure, and held prisoner on Isis, as is Emerson when he impetuously comes to rescue her. "Justin" is revealed as Maryam's elder half-sister and "Mrs FitzRoyce" as an old associate of Bertha. Through Emerson's efforts, Nefret escapes through a window of the boat, to be picked up by passing fishermen. Maryam, who is implicated in the plot, shows her true loyalties by removing the chains from Emerson.

The friends of Nefret and Emerson board the Amelia and devise a plan to rescue them. First they must figure out the true goal of the criminal gang. Revenge was an early motive for all the attacks on the Emersons, both family and friends. The true motive is to steal the treasures found in the God's Wives tomb, which are all being taken by ship to the museum in Cairo, from Luxor.

The final chase scene has Amelia, Ramses, Sethos, Selim, Daoud, Cyrus, Walter, and Bertie sailing down-river; their aim is to board the Isis and free Emerson. A few fire on the crew of the Isis initially, while Ramses and David swim to the other side and board. Aboard, they disable the women. Emerson strides in, having been aided by Maryam. Emerson had killed François. All jump off the boat, learning what Justin is doing. The Isis explodes, as young Justin set off dynamite on board the houseboat, killing himself as well.

At home, they tell their stories. Maryam tells her father the hold those women had on her – they took her year-old son. Sethos will find the boy. The last ones to speak are the twins; Charla asks if that woman will stop coming to her window at night. Justin had been scaring her, making her scream. Ramses reassures her, after first being pleased that his twins can talk.

== Characters ==
This book is notable in that the entire Emerson clan is present: Professor and Amelia Emerson, Walter and Evelyn Emerson, Ramses and Nefret Emerson and their children David John and Charla, Sennia Emerson, David and Lia Todros and their children Dolly and Evvie, Sethos, and Maryam. It is in this book that Sethos reveals his given name (Seth), to Evelyn.

== See also ==
- List of characters in the Amelia Peabody series
