= Lord of the Silent =

Book by Barbara Mertz

- First edition cover for Lord of the Silent
- Author: Elizabeth Peters
- Language: English
- Series: Amelia Peabody series mysteries
- Genre: Historical mystery
- Publisher: William Morrow
- Publication date: 2001
- Publication place: United States
- Media type: Print (hardback & paperback)
- Pages: x, 400
- ISBN: 0-380-97884-9
- OCLC: 46833594
- Dewey Decimal: 813/.54 21
- LC Class: PS3563.E747 L67 2001
- Preceded by: He Shall Thunder in the Sky
- Followed by: The Golden One

Lord of the Silent is the 13th in a series of historical mystery novels, written by Elizabeth Peters and featuring fictional sleuth and archaeologist Amelia Peabody. It was first published in 2001. The story is set in the 1915–1916 dig season in Egypt.

== Plot introduction ==
The story is set during the 1915–1916 archaeological dig season, when the Great War continues. The Emersons continue their work in Giza. Married eight months upon return to Egypt, Ramses and Nefret Emerson live in the dahabeah named Amelia on the Nile, hoping for a bit of honeymoon then checking on dig sites in Luxor. Close friends David and Lia Todros remain in England with their infant son, not ready for such travel, and for the safety of David. Emerson directs work at the main dig, and the family live in the house near Giza. Sennia Emerson, now age 6, joins this trip, her first dig, staying in the house with Amelia and Emerson. The butler Gargery and her nanny Bassima come along with Sennia.

One former associate of Ramses in the group of nationalists reappears, having escaped prison.

== Plot summary ==
While still in Cairo, Ramses is attacked by Asad, one of the nationalists who was in prison. Soon after, Ramses and Nefret sail the dahabeah to Luxor. In Luxor, their task is to check if there has been looting in the area. They encounter thieves who slip away without being caught. They notice a symbol resembling a yin and yang device marked in the stone at some tombs. They suspect that Sethos did not die from that gunshot, and is still thieving antiquities from tombs.

In Cairo, an unknown man guides Sennia to find an authentic stele in a heap of waste from digging out the tombs. Miss Margaret Minton, a news reporter, seeks Amelia to tell her the true story of her rescue from an emir who refused to take her seriously as a reporter before the war began. The rescuer was Sethos, and Amelia tells her he is dead.

Working at the dig, Emerson and Amelia find Asad's corpse placed in an ancient tomb. Fearing Ramses' reaction, they tell Nefret by letter and ask her not to share the news. Ramses lures Sethos out by bringing a portrait of Amelia to be reframed, and they talk. When Sethos leaves, Ramses and Nefret confront each other over the secret of Asad's murder.

At lunch in Luxor, Minton joins them, and next, Swiss archaeologist Mr Kuentz introduces himself. Ramses learns from Kuentz where he chased off some antiquities thieves, and heads there with Nefret, Jamil and Jumana. As Ramses climbs to reach an opening, a large rock falls past him down to where Nefret and George Barton stand. A man's corpse soars down. Ramses goes up to the cliff top, guessing two had been up there as the large rock had been levered out of its place.

Sethos, in two disguises, corners Nefret at a hotel, urging her to take Ramses out of Luxor. He gives her a loaded gun as protection. He indicates that there is a competitor for his place at the top of the thieving ring. does not know who his chief competitor is, but he is vicious, with three murders to his credit thus far.

Emerson suspects Kuentz as the competitor to Sethos and responsible for recent murders, based on the stele left for Sennia to find. Next, the Emersons proceed to Sethos, making plans to lure Kuentz out.

Emerson, Amelia, Semil and Daoud ride to find the hidden tomb, where Kuentz aims his rifle at Emerson. Kuentz's men are digging at an opening. They stop work, as Emerson, Selim and Daoud take over, digging to reach a shrine to Amon Re, a figure of him in gold, not a tomb. Each then looks at the shrine, one at a time. When Emerson comes up from viewing, he startles Kuentz and knocks him down. Kuentz is caught.

The four Emersons meet with Sethos, who is still recovering to discuss their prisoner Kuentz. He is a murderer, tomb robber, archaeologist, and a German spy, agent of the Central Powers. His position as spy is how he knew of the role Ramses had played. As Sethos reports to the War Department, he writes to Mr Smith for advice.

They celebrate Christmas in Luxor at the home of Cyrus, with the golden Amon Re safely in the house. Sethos dresses as Father Christmas. The next day, Sethos and Minton disappear. He left behind a gift for Nefret, jewelry from Queen T's tomb.

== Explanation of the novel's title ==
The title of the book refers to Amon-Re, a major deity of ancient Egypt (as early as 2000 BCE), usually depicted with the head of a ram.

"Amon, King of the Gods, Lord of the Silent who comes at the voice of the poor ...
who gives bread to him who has none ...
father of the orphan, husband of the widow ...
though the servant offends him, he is merciful."

“Epithets and attributes of Amon-Re, A composite from various prayers”

Epigraph in Lord of the Silent

== Reviews ==
Publishers Weekly predicted this novel would be a best-seller, describing the series as "uproarious Egyptological mysteries". They went on to say that "readers will find all the delicious trappings of a vintage Peters extravaganza—lost tombs, kidnappings, deadly attacks, mummies and sinister villains."

Marilyn Stasio, writing in The New York Times, considered that "Amelia is still a joy." However, the accumulation of family members and other characters in this novel is harder work for the reader than the earlier novels: "it takes a lot more concentration to keep track of the swarms of adopted children, relatives, native associates, political enemies and family cats that have accrued to the series since 1975."

== Publication history ==
This novel was on the Best Seller list in The New York Times.

== See also ==
- List of characters in the Amelia Peabody series
