= The Mummy Case =

Novel by Elizabeth Peters (aka Barbara Mertz)

- Paperback cover for The Mummy Case
- Author: Elizabeth Peters
- Language: English
- Series: Amelia Peabody series mysteries
- Genre: Historical mystery
- Publisher: Congdon & Weed (dist. St. Martin's Press)
- Publication date: 1985
- Publication place: United States
- Media type: Print (hardback & paperback)
- Pages: 313
- ISBN: 0-86553-140-4 (Congdon & Weed), 0312925476 (St. Martin's Press)
- OCLC: 11290775
- Dewey Decimal: 813/.54 19
- LC Class: PS3563.E747 M8 1985
- Preceded by: The Curse of the Pharaohs
- Followed by: Lion in the Valley

The Mummy Case is the third of a series of historical mystery novels written by Elizabeth Peters and featuring the character Amelia Peabody. It was first published in 1985. The story is set in the 1894–1895 dig season in Egypt.

== Plot summary ==
Amelia and her husband, Professor Radcliffe Emerson, return to Egypt for the 1894–1895 season to excavate the ruined pyramids of Mazghunah. Emerson had planned to dig at Dahshoor, but the Director of Antiquities, Jacques de Morgan, had retained the excavation rights for himself. For the first time, the Emersons bring along their precocious young son Ramses and his cat Bastet, along with John, a sturdy footman, to watch him.

While in Cairo, Amelia sees a scrap of papyrus at a shop, yet the owner Abd el Atti will not admit to it. He is found that night, murdered in his shop.

The family settles in near their dig in an abandoned monastery, with a village of Copts nearby, whose priest is Father Girgis. Three American missionaries of a small Protestant church visit them: The intolerant Reverend Ezekiel Jones, his sister Charity, and handsome David Cabot of the Boston Cabots. The missionaries are converting Copts, already a minority in Egypt, and learned of the Emersons from M de Morgan, head of the Department of Antiquities.

The workmen, Egyptian Moslems under Abdullah, reis to Emerson, make their camp in Abizeh. Abdullah's youngest son Selim, 14 years old, becomes friends with much younger Ramses, and takes over the job of supervising Ramses. Emerson, Amelia, Ramses and Selim visit de Morgan and his helper Kalinescheff, a Russian prince, at Dahshoor. Amelia brings up the increase in trade of stolen artifacts, and the presence of a Master Criminal, a new force who has organized the groups of thieves. De Morgan does not agree about this Master Criminal.

Amelia and Ramses meet a German baroness at the missionary's Sunday service, on the arm of David Cabot. The baroness has a collection of antiquities, including a mummy case, and a lion cub on her dahabeah. The antiquities anger Emerson and the caged lion cub angers Ramses. The baroness gives some of the antiquities to Emerson; Ramses sneaks the lion cub to his home, aiming to train it.

The mummy case from the German baroness was empty and someone has burned it after stealing it from the storeroom. A mummified body with amulets is found separately by Emerson; he had bought a face painting of a woman from Abd's shop in Cairo. The three had once fit together.

Ramses finds the murdered body of Habib, son of Abd, at the site. The Protestant missionaries bury it.

A note from Sister Charity lures Emerson and Amelia out of their compound to meet at midnight. They are seized by three tomb robbers and taken to the Black Pyramid in de Morgan's dig at Dashoor. The men drop them to the wet bottom, 16 feet below the next level. Shortly after they assess their situation, their son Ramses is dropped in next to them.

The three escape home to find Abdullah drugged and the place occupied by the thieves, whose leader is Father Girgis, or rather an Englishman playing the role of a Coptic priest. Ramses is attacked by a thug, spurring Amelia into furious action against them. The leader seeks the pectoral belonging to a princess that Ramses found. They tie up the thugs.

At the place of Ezekiel Jones, they find him ready to kill John and disarm him. Ezekiel Jones asserts that he is the prophet, the messiah, mentioned in the Bible. Ezekiel was enraged by the Coptic script on the papyrus at Abd's shop, so he strangled and hanged Abd el Atti. The manuscript is a copy of a lost gospel written by Didymus Thomas that appeared heretical to Ezekiel. There were two identical mummy cases for a husband and wife in the later Roman era, and used Coptic papyri as waste to make the mummy case out of cartonnage. Hamid, son of Abd, shifted the identical cases to fool others. Ezekiel killed Hamid with his bare hands and burned the case to destroy the papyrus with the words that so angered him. The three missionaries return to Boston.

The Russian prince gave information to the thieves. Amelia does not reveal to de Morgan the item found by Ramses in the Black Pyramid, wanted by the Master Criminal. Ramses, holding the box with the pectoral in it, then speaks alone with de Morgan, making a deal.

The family leaves Egypt in March, having dug out the substructure of their pyramid. In England they greet their newest nephew, and the lion cub is accepted at Chalfont. De Morgan's photo was in The Illustrated London News, a British newspaper, showing the jewels of a princess found in his pyramid.

== New characters ==
Continuing characters introduced for the first time in this novel include the Master Criminal (later known as Sethos) and Selim (youngest son of their reis Abdullah).

== Reviews ==
Kirkus Reviews found this novel to have period ambience and ironic comedy, written with "a crisp sense of style that rarely flags."

== Quotes ==
In Ramses' first time at an archaeological dig, he makes many unexpected statements, for one of his young age.

Ramses got off his donkey. Squatting, he began to sift through the debris...[He] held up an object that looked like a broken branch. "It is a femuw," he said in a trembling voice. "Excuse me, Mama – a femur, I meant to say." [...]

Ramses rose obediently. The warm breeze of the desert ruffled his hair. His eyes glowed with the fervor of a pilgrim who has finally reached the Holy City.

== See also ==
- List of Amelia Peabody characters
