= The Ape Who Guards the Balance =

Book by Elizabeth Peters

- First edition cover for The Ape Who Guards the Balance
- Author: Elizabeth Peters
- Language: English
- Series: Amelia Peabody mysteries
- Genre: Historical mystery
- Publisher: Avon Books
- Publication date: 1998
- Publication place: United States
- Media type: Print (hardback & paperback)
- Pages: 376
- ISBN: 0-380-97657-9
- OCLC: 38030176
- Dewey Decimal: 813/.54 21
- LC Class: PS3563.E747 A87 1998
- Preceded by: Seeing a Large Cat
- Followed by: Guardian of the Horizon

The Ape Who Guards the Balance is the tenth in a series of historical mystery novels, written by Elizabeth Peters, first published in 1998, and featuring fictional sleuth and archaeologist Amelia Peabody. The story is set in the 1906–1907 dig season in Egypt.

== Explanation of the novel's title ==
The book's title refers to the Egyptian god Thoth, the divine scribe who waits for the heart of the dead to be weighed on a scale and judged so that he may record its fate; Thoth is usually represented as having the head of an ibis, but also appears as a baboon or ape with the balancing scales.

This symbol of ancient Egyptian culture is mentioned a few times in the text, in particular in Chapter 4 when the teacher of English gives a carved pendant of a baboon ("of ancient Egyptian origin—the baboon, one of the symbols of Thoth.") to Ramses to hand to his mother, saying the pendant represents "The ape who sits beside the balance that weighs the heart."

== Plot summary ==
While in London, Amelia Peabody joins a protest for women's suffrage. The protest marchers demand to present a petition to a prominent political opponent of the women's movement. As a delegation enters the man's house, Amelia recognises some of its members as associates of the master criminal Sethos, who is manipulating the protest as a means of entering the house and stealing a valuable private collection of Egyptian antiquities. Later, an attempt is made to kidnap Amelia in central London, which is foiled by Professor Emerson and Ramses. The family concludes that Sethos has returned, and that they will be safer in returning to Egypt as fast as possible.

In Cairo, they mark Christmas with friends, including Sir Edward Washington, not seen for six years. Nefret has been studying to be a physician, and uses her training when her family are injured. Disguised as shady dealers in antiquities, Ramses and his Egyptian friend David visit the slums of Cairo, where they acquire a magnificent papyrus from the dealer Yussuf Mahmud but are narrowly saved by Nefret from an unsuspected knife attack.

The family proceeds to Luxor, where Emerson will be excavating minor tombs in the Valley of the Kings. Since Emerson has annoyed M. Maspero and wealthy sponsor Theodore M. Davis, he is initially not allowed near the important royal tombs. However, Nefret persuades the authorities to allow Emerson to work in a royal tomb, number 5 (KV5). This is located close to the place where the young archaeologist Ned Ayrton is hoping to discover a new tomb. During the course of the novel, Ayrton manages to uncover the entrance to a previously unknown tomb, KV55. Ayrton's sponsor Davis excitedly announces that the tomb is that of Queen Tiye, mother of the pharaoh Akhenaton. Emerson, Nefret and Ramses ensure that photographs are taken by Sir Edward and the mysterious Mr Paul, before Davis invites friends in the tomb Ned has uncovered.

Although the family hopes that the gangs are not following them, a man breaks into Nefret's bedroom as she sleeps; she wakes and defends herself and the box containing the papyrus. A few days later, Yussuf Mahmud's body is found in the Nile, horribly mangled by an apparent crocodile attack even though crocodiles no longer occur around Luxor. As Nefret, Ramses and David walk, a prostitute named Layla calls out to Ramses; David recognizes her as a widow of his one-time employer and tells her story.

Ramses and David are kidnapped, beaten and imprisoned. Ramses is freed by Layla and manages to rescue David, beating up two guards in the process. The two escape to Selim, where Nefret treats their wounds. Ramses privately tells David about his attraction to Nefret, and gets the impression that David himself is attracted to her. Despite misgivings by some members of the family, Sir Edward moves in to the Emerson house. They realize that it is another gang attacking Amelia's family; Amelia tells the children, now 19 to 21 years old, her story of Sethos. A young girl's dead body is next found in the river, also apparently killed by a crocodile. Meanwhile Ramses is struggling with his increasing feelings of jealousy toward David, whom he increasingly sees as a rival.

Given the appearance of another murderous gang, the family is increasingly anxious about the planned arrival in Egypt of Walter and Evelyn Emerson and their 17 year old daughter Lia. Amelia and the Professor send Selim and Daoud as messengers to Cairo, advising Walter and family to return to England. Lia slips away from her parents and boards the train to Luxor, accompanied by Daoud. Walter and Evelyn follow with Selim. In Luxor, the two families are shocked to discover that Lia and David are in love. Amelia, who has always prided herself on treating Egyptians as equals, struggles with her instinctive rejection of the romance, while the Professor, Nefret and Ramses support the couple. Walter and Evelyn return to England with their daughter, leaving David forlorn. Meanwhile, Ramses is overjoyed that David is not his rival for Nefret.

Another family discussion leads to consideration of Bertha as the attacker of Amelia's children, and the killer of her own gang members. Amelia tells them of the hatred Bertha expressed (first seen in The Hippopotamus Pool). They agree to protect each other, not travel alone. An apparently hurt goat is used to trap Amelia as she rides home with Ramses, and a man comes running at her. Ramses intervenes and an unknown shoots the attacker in the back. The attacker was one of the guards Ramses beat up earlier.

Emerson, tailed by Ramses, goes to search the town brothel for Bertha. He finds a woman in English riding costume, covered except for the face; the woman is dead, shot in the head. He assumes it is Bertha, who committed suicide.

Amelia visits the school where their cook learns English. It is another trap, as Matilda grabs her. Amelia wakes later, chained to a bed in an unknown place, with Sir Edward bound even tighter in the next bed. He admits he works with Sethos, the chief, and describes Bertha as once part of the gang, but who has started her own gangs, now against Sethos. The young girl murdered earlier had been in Bertha's gang, just like the woman posed in the riding habit to fool Emerson; Bertha killed both. Bertha is alive, with a focus on mental torture. Sethos enters the room through the window as rescue. Untied, Sir Edward leaves through the window. Sethos then frees the weakened Amelia. They exit through the window into the night and the cold rain. He leads her to Abdullah's house, where she gets clean and dry, and sleeps. Emerson and the children join her.

They leave Abdullah's house in a large group. A woman in the mud shoots three times, hitting Abdullah. Bertha is the woman, killed by the group of men who fall upon her. Abdullah dies in Amelia's arms, a very sad scene. He is buried that night.

Sir Edward leaves the Emerson house, leaving a note.

Selim takes over his father's role at the dig, as they all go back to work. Ramses aids Ned Ayrton, while the rest work in KV5. Katherine takes steps to take over the school in Luxor. Layla returns to her own house, now that Bertha is truly dead.

The photographer Mr Paul will leave before the sarcophagus is opened. Amelia offers David and Nefret to finish the photography. Mr Paul asks Amelia to meet him at the train station, as he has information for her. She recognizes him as Sethos. Because he had stolen objects from the tomb, Sethos is unwilling to give the first photos to Davis, as they record all the items present. In the distant future, he will give the photos to her. He boards the train and disappears.

Nefret witnesses the opening of the coffin in KV55, the tomb worked by Ned for Davis. The mummy disintegrates to dust and bones. Nefret recognizes the skeleton as male, not the queen that Davis wants. Davis does not value Nefret's knowledge. Davis then passes the Emersons at work, provoking Emerson, who in his turn angers Davis, who insists Emerson be barred from the Valley of the Kings. Amelia distracts her husband by telling him, and the rest, of her conversation with Sethos about the thefts and the photos. Besides the photographs, Ramses can make a list of what he saw the first day; his memory is perfect.

Amelia and Emerson tour for a few weeks, leaving the children behind, as they are old enough to take care of themselves.

== Real events ==
The plot has a few links to the real world of Egyptology. Had Emerson continued to dig in KV5, he would have discovered a tomb complex that was far more elaborate than any ever found in Egypt. Of course, the fictional Emerson failed to uncover what the real Kent Weeks discovered years later in 1995, finding the most extensive tomb in the Valley of the Kings. It was built for the children of Rameses II and contains over 150 rooms, many untouched for thousands of years. The author knew of that success before completing the novel, and of the equally real failure of Theodore Davis to handle his dig that season, and his lax procedures in excavating tomb KV55.

== Reviews ==
Kirkus Reviews followed the plot of this story, yet found it too long and the writing "fussy" for an average reader. The novel was "a fun trip for readers with an interest in Egyptology; for others, a confusing, fussily written, long, long trek."

Publishers Weekly noted that Peters had been awarded Grand Master by the Mystery Writers of America for her 30 year career shortly before this novel was published. They felt this novel reflected the author's merits as an author of mystery novels. They too feel the plot is complicated, "but the maturing of Ramses, Nefret and David offers particular pleasure and gives the book depth and poignance." The conclusion was that this novel was a "grand, galloping adventure with a heart as big as the Great Pyramid itself."

Marilyn Stasio, writing in The New York Times, found the novel lively. She remarked that "Although Peters lets the younger generation handle most of the derring-do in this romantic tale, Amelia remains an irrepressible delight." Stasio quotes the novel, when fictional Amelia cheers up real Howard Carter now at a low ebb in his career: "This is not the end of your career, Howard, she reassures the archeologist who will one day discover Tutankhamen's tomb. Something is going to turn up!"

== Awards ==
The novel was nominated for an Agatha Award in the "Best Novel" category in 1998.

The author, Elizabeth Peters also known as Barbara Mertz, received the Grand Master Award for her career in mystery writing from the Mystery Writers of America shortly before this novel was published.

== See also ==
- List of characters in the Amelia Peabody series
