= Seeing a Large Cat =

1997 novel by Elizabeth Peters (Barbara Mertz)

- Cover for the first edition of Seeing a Large Cat
- Author: Elizabeth Peters
- Language: English
- Series: Amelia Peabody series mysteries
- Genre: Historical mystery
- Publisher: Warner Books
- Publication date: 1997
- Publication place: United States
- Media type: Print (hardback & paperback)
- Pages: ix, 386
- ISBN: 0-446-51834-4
- OCLC: 36029647
- Dewey Decimal: 813/.54 21
- LC Class: PS3563.E747 S43 1997
- Preceded by: The Hippopotamus Pool
- Followed by: The Ape Who Guards the Balance

Seeing a Large Cat is the ninth novel in the Amelia Peabody historical mystery series by Elizabeth Peters, first published in 1997. The story takes place in Egypt during the archaeological dig season of 1903–1904.

== Plot summary ==
The story opens at Amelia's favorite hotel, Shepheard's in Cairo in 1903. The family reunites with son Ramses, now age sixteen, and their adopted nephew David, age 18. The two boys spent six months with a Bedouin friend of the family in Egypt, learning manly skills. In previous summers, the children spent months with Emerson's brother Walter and his wife Evelyn and their children; that couple took in David as their son. The two couples worked on finishing a major book; Walter and Evelyn stay in London to see the book through publication instead of joining Emerson and Amelia in Egypt.

Daughter Nefret, same age as David, spent her summer studying anatomy with Louisa Aldrich-Blake at the London School of Medicine for Women.

Radcliffe Emerson receives a message to stay away from a tomb numbered 20A, not part of the number system set up.

Dolly, daughter of Colonel Bellingham, a veteran of the American Civil War, a Southern rebel, insists she needs protection from a stalker, selecting Ramses for a role he does not want.

Donald and Enid Fraser (first met in Lion in the Valley) are in Cairo, accompanied by Mrs Jones, a woman who runs fashionable seances communicating with an ancient Egyptian princess. This triggers an obsession in Donald with finding the princess and her tomb. Enid asks Amelia for help. The American Cyrus Vandergelt again returns to Egypt for the season.

The cat Bastet, long the close companion of Ramses and who helped save him from kidnappers in the previous novel set a few years earlier, died a month earlier. He does not show his grief.

The Emersons built a house in Luxor and retain the dahabeah moored on the Nile for this dig. The children frequently stay in the dahabeah.

Work begins in an area in the Valley of the Kings between two numbered tombs 20 and 21; Hatshepsut's tomb 20 has a group working under Howard Carter, whose afternoons were spent in his duties as Inspector of Monuments for Upper Egypt. Not long into removing material from the entrance, an oddly wrapped mummy is found, not ancient, but a more recently dead young woman wrapped in modern cloth. Several people witness this find, including Cyrus, the Frasers, Mrs Jones, and Colonel Bellingham. The latter recognizes his late fourth wife, who vanished during his trip five years earlier to Egypt. Bellingham says a man, Dutton Scudder his secretary, took his wife then, and claims that Scudder killed her; Bellingham wants vengeance.

The Emersons inspect the corpse, learning she was murdered. It is a challenge to figure how she was placed there, who did it. They call in the British officials to report the find and the suspected murder. American and British officials decide that the body will go to the American consul.

Ramses and David get hurt in some fights with a tourist named Booghis Tucker Tollington, who they guess is the one-time secretary to Bellingham and lover of the dead woman, keeping secrets from Emerson and Amelia.

Cyrus is impressed by Mrs Jones. Amelia aided by Ramses devise a scheme to get Donald and Enid's marriage on track, by staging the next seance with Enid dressed as the ancient princess. This is successful; they head home, leaving Mrs Jones behind. She becomes the companion to Dolly, the rude Southern belle.

Bellingham is dangerous with his shotgun, his bullet grazing Ramses one dark night. Nefret shares with Emerson all she and the boys have seen and done. Thus Emerson is on the alert and helps get his wounded son from the water.

At a family "council of war" the Emersons turn the story around, that Mrs Bellingham was running from Bellingham, leaving a cruel husband and in her death, left behind the man who did love her. Key observation by Nefret and Amelia was all the petticoats she wore, carrying away all her clothing, meaning she planned her escape. Further, she was facing her killer when the sharp weapon went through her.

Emerson has braced the tunnel, and brought in machines to clear the air—electricity in Luxor. Tensions are rising in both the house and the house boat; no one can sleep one night. Ramses sees Mrs Jones waving for help in the hour before dawn, and wakes the house. All go to the tomb, finding Scudder shot dead, after trying to expose Bellingham, who murdered his wife with his sword cane.

Bellingham has just murdered Scudder with the shotgun he still holds, and admits that he murdered his wife. Bellingham grabs Amelia, who tries to talk him down, gaining information but not succeeding in calming him. He shoots at the joint of support timbers, causing a collapse, taking Amelia with him to the next chamber. She awakens with a hurt leg to find Ramses followed them, and has just banged Bellingham's head on the ground to subdue him, instead killing him. The family is literally split by the collapse. Ramses explores the tomb, finding a wall of cut stone. He removes mortar and slips the stone out, finding the crew working in tomb 20 pleased to see him. Rescue ensues quickly.

It is clear the only person guilty of these murders is Colonel Bellingham.

On Amelia's advice, Mrs Jones takes orphaned Dolly to Cairo, to hand her over to the American consulate, to escort her home. Then Mrs Jones can give her reply to the proposal of marriage she received from Cyrus.

In the end, the three teens are now close, the beautiful Nefret and the two boys. The boys discuss the notion of love, and Ramses tolerates the cat Sekhmet.

Work shifted to tomb 44.

== Narrative voice ==
Earlier novels in this series are narrated by Amelia in the first person, seen from her viewpoint. In this novel, Ramses' viewpoint, expressed in third person voice, is added. The device used is Manuscript H, his notes found in the family papers, describing his views and the actions of him, David and Nefret when away from the parents.

== Reviews ==
Publishers Weekly said that this is a "charming" adventure featuring Amelia Peabody. "Peters's fans will relish this latest adventure that explores mysteries of the heart as well as murder."

Kirkus Reviews described the "triumphal procession" of novels establishing the "mythos" of main character Amelia Peabody and her "uxorious" husband and Egyptologist Emerson. The writing style is less than the best, yet "Peters compensates for ordinary prose and fussy plotting with humor and nicely calibrated domestic psychology. Fans will follow her, if only to learn how Amelia copes with Ramses's love life."

Marilyn Stasio, writing in The New York Times, linked this with novel series that are "smart enough to know when to fiddle around with the formula for a successful series – and when to leave well enough alone." Stasio identified the specific aspects of the series and of this novel that make it worth reading. It is true that Victorian heroine "Amelia's unquenchable joie de l'aventure" dominates the novels written in an exuberant style, yet there is more. "There are always grand views of Egyptian antiquities in her stories, as well as acidic caricatures of globe-trotting tourists and the endlessly entertaining spectacle of busy professional parents confounded by their own progeny." This novel "finds the mummified remains of a rich American's runaway wife – a mere taste of the melodramatic amusements that await in Luxor."

== Awards ==
The novel was nominated for an Agatha Award in the "Best Novel" category in 1997.

== See also ==
- List of characters in the Amelia Peabody series
