= The Falcon at the Portal =

Book by Barbara Mertz

- First edition cover for The Falcon at the Portal
- Author: Elizabeth Peters
- Language: English
- Series: Amelia Peabody series mysteries
- Genre: Historical mystery
- Publisher: Avon Books
- Publication date: 1999
- Publication place: United States
- Media type: Print (hardback & paperback)
- Pages: 366
- ISBN: 0-380-97658-7
- OCLC: 40862106
- Dewey Decimal: 813/.54 21
- LC Class: PS3563.E747 F3 1999
- Preceded by: A River in the Sky
- Followed by: The Painted Queen

The Falcon at the Portal (1999) is the 11th (in order of writing) in a series of historical mystery novels by Elizabeth Peters, first published in 1999. It features fictional archaeologist and sleuth Amelia Peabody. The story is set in the 1911–1912 dig season in Egypt.

Reviewers of this novel found it well-written with rich characters, and the mystery was solved, yet found the ending unsatisfactory, or in the words of one, the novel demands a sequel.

== Explanation of the novel's title ==
The title of the book refers to Harakhte, also known as Horus of the Dawn, son of Osiris. After passing through the underworld, he emerged through the "portal of the dawn" into a new day.

At the end of the book, Amelia dreams of Abdullah, who tells her:

"The worst of the storm is yet to come, Sitt. You will need all your courage to survive; but your heart will not fail you, and in the end the clouds will blow away and the falcon will fly through the portal of the dawn."

== Plot summary ==
A collector of Egyptian antiques visits the house in Kent in fall 1911, asking Emerson for a second opinion on a recent purchase. It is a fake; the visitor wants Emerson to buy it in return for silence on its source. The seller said it came from David Todros, selling his grandfather Abdullah's collection. Thus begins the case to be solved: who wants to ruin David's reputation while selling fakes as if true antiques? The Emersons opt not to tell David or Nefret, in this week before David's wedding with Lia Emerson. Ramses will investigate the extent of items sold under this wholly false provenance.

The wedding takes place at the country estate of Walter and Evelyn Emerson, parents of Lia. Three guests travel from Egypt (Selim, Daoud, and Fatimah), and Cyrus and Katherine Vandergelt come from America. The newlyweds leave on their honeymoon, with plans to meet Amelia, Emerson and Ramses in Egypt.

Not invited to this wedding was Percy Peabody, offensive and evil nephew of Amelia. Percy published his memoir of one visit with his aunt in Egypt, entertaining due to his exaggerations and lies, written in grandiose style. Quotes from the fictional book open the chapters.

Arriving in Alexandria, Amelia is not pleased to see nephew Percy, in the uniform of the Egyptian army.

Emerson chose to excavate at Zawyet el'Aryan, south of the great pyramids of Giza. They take a villa in the area, near the tram between Cairo and the pyramids. New acquaintances Jack Reynolds, young Egyptologist, and his sister Maude, are neighbors. Geoffrey Godwin, another young Egyptologist, worked with Jack the previous season, in that area. Maude has set her sights on Ramses, from first meeting. He is not similarly attracted, still in love with Nefret, but never confessing his feelings. Geoff is attracted to Nefret. Geoff mentions meeting David, the newlywed archaeologist, last season.

They settle in quickly, in the villa and at the dig.

Nefret opened a clinic for women, particularly those forced into prostitution. A female physician staffs it. Nefret and Ramses meet Percy outside the clinic, where Nefret explodes at Percy about men's role in prostitution.

Emerson and Amelia meet Karl von Bork, again working at a dig.

They begin listing possible suspects, narrowing to a man who is young, English or European, archaeologist, familiar with the Emerson family. A talented artist may also be involved.

Ramses seeks Wardani, a leader in the Egyptian nationalist movement, to emphasize the risks to David at the moment, given the harsh British policies on the movement. Alone on the boat, Nefret is accosted by Percy; in her efforts to get rid of him, she spills a secret tied to Ramses which may lead to more trouble for Ramses.

Someone shoots at Amelia as she rides on horseback from villa to the dig. Ramses adds that the perpetrator of the forgeries is living locally. He wants to seek more help from friends in finding the culprit, which is agreed.

A support fails in a grave, covering Ramses in the collapse. Ramses is unhurt. When Cyrus and Katherine arrive, the Emersons call a meeting with them, Selim and Daoud to discuss the forgery problem and the incidents so far. Cyrus suggests a focus on the dig site hiding something, which proves a wise insight.

After Christmas, starting to work inside the pyramid one morning, Ramses sees trouble. The body of Maude Reynolds is at the bottom of the shaft. She had been murdered; her body was brought to their dig. Her brother is distraught. Friend Geoff makes clear to Amelia his attraction to Nefret; he has already proposed to her and been turned down.

Nefret falls in love with Ramses, after he rescues her from an unwanted visit from Percy at the villa. Finally, they are both in love with each other, the long awaited event. The next day, as they are about to tell Amelia and Emerson, a small child, its young Egyptian mother and an old man enter, wanting money to keep the child's father private. The child has the eyes of a Peabody. The old man blames Ramses and Ramses says it is not his child. In that moment, Nefret abruptly leaves. In another moment, the Emersons, parents and son, know Percy is the father and will not care for his child. They take the child Sennia into their home. Ramses is good with her. He met the child earlier and was already providing financial support for mother and child, but telling no one.

Several days later, Nefret announces that she has married Geoff Godwin, on the rebound. The pressure on Ramses is huge but he says nothing.

Ramses tries to find the young mother Rashida, a prostitute, and her procurer. Neither is found again.

David and Lia arrive; they live in the dahabeah, the Amelia, in the River Nile. Ramses and David work together closely.

Emerson and Amelia learn of the project to get at the forger of antiquities by getting at the gang bringing illegal drugs into the country. The leader is the same man. Emerson begins digging in a new place on the site, aware that there is something at their site that the forger does not want uncovered.

The day of resolution occurs in the pyramid, when the shaft is cleared. Jack is hidden with his rifle, emerging when all are present, demanding a fair fight with Ramses. Jack believes Ramses killed his sister Maude and is presently framing Jack for the crime. The two agree to fight with fists. This draws the true criminal out as Geoff knows that Ramses will win a fistfight; Geoff quickly shoots Jack in the leg and then aims his weapon at the others. Emerson shouts at Amelia to fall to the ground, so the bullet misses her, while Emerson and Ramses force the gun from Geoff. Ramses punches Geoff in the face, so Geoff steps back a step and slips into the shaft. Ramses grabs hold of Geoff and David approaches to grab his other hand, while Selim grabs hold of Ramses so that Ramses will not be dragged into the shaft. Geoff refuses David's help, breaks the hold of Ramses and falls to his death.

Geoff had used David's name for both his illegal businesses; Geoff had prodded Jack into believing Ramses had killed Maude when it was Geoff who murdered her. Geoff led the drug smuggling and the theft of true antiquities and selling of forgeries. Maude was the artist making the forgeries, recognized by David when he saw the gift Maude gave to Ramses at Christmas. When she shifted her romantic interest from Geoff to Ramses, she became a liability to Geoff. All the crimes belong to Geoff.

Percy arranged the scene of Sennia, her mother and the pimp to embarrass Ramses in front of his family. Nefret reacted by fleeing and marrying the criminal, though she did not know his true character until the end. She feels guilty and will not share why, and becomes withdrawn. The doctor recommends she go to a clinic in Switzerland, and Amelia will take her there.

Work at the dig stops early, though it is clear now they have found a totally new and very old tomb, with a season of good work ahead of them. Ramses plans to work at another site for a month, keeping Sennia with him, with the help of the women in Selim's family to care for her. David and Lia will stay with him. Evil Percy is still in Egypt, and is still a threat to Ramses.

Amelia has one more dream of talking with the late Abdullah, who tells her there are more hard challenges to come, but she does have the strength to face them.

== Real events and people ==
The "Wardani" with whom Ramses meets names himself for Ibrahim Nassif al-Wardani, who was responsible for assassinating Boutros Ghali the previous year. The Denshawai incident is mentioned: the Emerson family express their strong opinions on the matter.

== Reviews ==
Kirkus Reviews found the plot unresolved, "incomprehensible". The setting of the story is well-written, the characters are interesting, but the novel moves to a "melodramatic and violent denouement that sheds little light on an ever more muddled story."

A reviewer in the Chicago Tribune says this book demands a sequel, to finish the plot. To its credit, "the book is packed with intriguing characters and dangerous situations, and the villain, who can be picked out long before the climax, is unmasked." Regarding the ending, "But there is no happy ending, and I think it only right that readers demand the sequel posthaste."

A third reviewer found much to like in this novel, besides naming the thief and the murderers. Character development is strong for David, for Ramses and Nefret, and for the family taking in the illegitimate child of Percy and an Egyptian prostitute. Yet this novel is "the set-up for the next book in the series."

== See also ==
- List of characters in the Amelia Peabody series
