= Evelyn Emerson =

Evelyn Emerson is a fictional character from the Amelia Peabody series of historical mystery novels by Elizabeth Peters. She is the closest friend, and later sister-in-law, of the protagonist, fictional sleuth and archaeologist Amelia Peabody.

== Personal History ==
Born Evelyn Barton-Forbes, she was the granddaughter of the Earl of Ellesmere, who raised her. When Evelyn displayed a talent for drawing, her grandfather hired a tutor, Alberto, who seduced her and convinced her to elope with him. She did so, enraging her grandfather and causing him to suffer a crippling stroke.

After the couple reached Rome, Alberto abandoned her, saying he had only been after her grandfather's money. Devastated, Evelyn lost the will to live and collapsed on the street, where she was found by Amelia Peabody, on a tour of Europe. Amelia took Evelyn under her wing, and the two of them became best friends, as close as sisters.

Traveling with Amelia to Egypt, the two women met Radcliffe Emerson and his younger brother, Walter, in a Cairo museum. Walter and Evelyn fell instantly in love, but Evelyn insisted that her reputation was damaged too far for her to ever marry again, while Walter was too shy to force his affections on her.

Joining the Emersons on their archaeological dig, Amelia and Evelyn both threw themselves into the work, with Evelyn providing sketches of tomb paintings and hieroglyphic reliefs. With Amelia's prodding, Walter professed his love, and when Evelyn confessed her "sins," Walter told her he didn't care, and the two of them were engaged.

It was not until then that Evelyn found out that Alberto's appearance had been a plot by her distant cousin Lucas/Luigi to push her out of her grandfather's will. Amelia and the Emersons apprehended Alberto and Luigi, and found that Evelyn's grandfather, before dying, had recanted his anger and reinstated Evelyn as his heir, making her one of the wealthiest women in England. She and Walter married, and settled in England.

== Role in the Novels ==
After marriage, Evelyn mothers a large brood of children, and settles for a home life in contrast to Amelia and Radcliffe's annual travels to Egypt. Radcliffe, who admires Evelyn's talents as much as his brother's, considers it a shame for her to abandon her career.

But in later years, after the children are grown, she and Walter occasionally accompany the Emersons to Egypt to assist on archaeological digs.

The first instance of this is in The Hippopotamus Pool when she and Walter are going through marital troubles after their latest child dies in infancy. Already in Egypt, Radcliffe proposes that she and Walter be given distraction to help them through it. While in Egypt, Evelyn takes a particular shine to David Todros, a young Egyptian boy working for a professional forger, who is also an amazingly talented artist. After he runs away, Walter and Evelyn adopt him and take him back to England.

A few years later, when David and her daughter Lia fall in love, she and Walter are initially resistant to the idea of them marrying, but overcome their objections, again with Amelia's prodding.

Walter and Evelyn had six children: Radcliffe Junior ("Raddie"), twin brothers Johnny (killed in the First World War) and Willy, Amelia Junior ("Lia"), Margaret, and the above-mentioned baby that dies in infancy. Evelyn also miscarries at least twice.

== Character ==
Evelyn appears a contrast to Amelia in every way: fair where Amelia is dark, demure where Amelia is direct. She dotes on her children and her husband, and has a generous heart - many of her maidservants are down-on-their-luck girls who have been thrown out of other establishments or fallen on hard times.

Yet underneath, she has nerves of steel and a ruthlessly logical mind. In The Snake, the Crocodile, and the Dog, even Amelia, who is used to women being underestimated, is stunned to read a letter account of Evelyn subduing a burglar in her home with a heavy parasol of the kind Amelia herself carries, and to hear Evelyn proposing a possible solution to the mystery that Amelia herself overlooked.
