= The Serpent on the Crown =

2005 novel by Elizabeth Peters

- First edition cover for The Serpent on the Crown
- Author: Elizabeth Peters
- Cover artist: Phill Singer
- Language: English
- Series: Amelia Peabody series mysteries
- Genre: Historical mystery
- Publisher: HarperCollins
- Publication date: 2005
- Publication place: United States
- Media type: Print (hardback & paperback)
- Pages: 350
- ISBN: 0-06-059178-1
- OCLC: 57008254
- Dewey Decimal: 813/.54 22
- LC Class: PS3563.E747 S44 2005
- Preceded by: Children of the Storm
- Followed by: Tomb of the Golden Bird

The Serpent on the Crown is the 17th in a series of historical mystery novels, written by Elizabeth Peters and published in 2005. It features fictional sleuth and archaeologist Amelia Peabody. The story is set in 1922, in the dig season in Egypt.

== Plot summary ==
In 1922 the Emersons are excavating at Deir el Medina, living in Luxor, when melodramatic Mrs Magda Petherick appears, hands them a box with an antique that she believes killed her husband in November. She fears its curse will kill her. Emerson agrees to hold the antique and to get rid of the curse. The box holds a solid gold small statue of a pharaoh, and it is both beautiful and a genuine antique, likely from the era of Amenhotep. Their friend Cyrus Vandergelt assures them of its high value in the antiques market, and says he will be happy to buy it.

Mrs Petherick's stepson Adrian, who is recovering from the Great War, accuses them of taking the most valuable item in his father's collection. Harriet, his sister and caretaker, takes him away. Emerson revises his plan of work to learn the provenance of the statue. He goes to Cairo to get permission to work in KV55; he returns with Sethos. Experienced in robbing tombs in his past, Sethos never saw or sold that fine statue. He and Heinrich Lidman join the staff.

Emerson does the exorcism to end the power of the curse. The next morning, they learn that Mrs Petherick's body was found in the gardens of the hotel, with white flower petals scattered over her. She was dressed in red, not her black clothes as a widow. The autopsy reveals she was smothered.

Emerson realizes the golden statue has been stolen by Lidman. He, Amelia, and the Vandergelts pursue him. Lidman is in tomb 25 in the West Valley, and he has taken Jumana hostage. After a struggle, Jumana rolls away from Lidman. Lidman escapes and starts climbing; Amelia shoots him in the leg.

Before he dies, Lidman confesses that his true name is Morritz X Daffinger. Daffinger was Magda Petherick's first husband. Lidman, an archaeologist, was comrades with Daffinger before he died in the war. When Daffinger became a prisoner of war, Magda did not wait for him to return, and went to England where she met her wealthy husband. Daffinger found her and blackmailed her. He killed her after she tried and failed to kill him.

Ramses, who specializes in reading ancient Egyptian writing, finds one note at the site about asking the gods' forgiveness for wrongdoing. He hires an assistant, Mikhail Katchenovsky. After translating all of the note, Katchenovsky wants to claim sole credit and threatens Ramses with a gun; Amelia is shot when she attempts to intervene. Katchenovsky is charged with attempted murder. Daoud finds the one piece of the gold statue that was missing, the serpent in the crown, and puts the completed statue next to Amelia as she recovers.

More scraps of papyrus found at the dig reveal that the statue is one of Tutankhamun, the one pharaoh whose tomb has not been found. A worker who lived at Deir el Medina stole it and placed it in a temple, along with his note of confession in the 18th dynasty. As Mrs Petherick's second marriage was invalid, Mr Petherick's collection passes to his children. Harriet sells the gold statue to Cyrus to secure the money to care for her brother.

== Title ==
The book's title is from the Poetical Stela of Thutmose III:

"I have robbed their nostrils of the breath of life and made the dread of you fill their hearts. My serpent on your brow consumed them."

== Reviews ==
Kirkus Reviews found this novel a bit less complex or convoluted in plot than others in this series. In their view, "Peabody's Victorian rhetoric can go over the top, but her likable family's fans will find much to enjoy in an adventure less convoluted than usual, salted with the obligatory tidbits of Egyptology."

Andrew Newman in The New York Times wrote about the audiobook narrated by Barbara Rosenblat. Newman observed her "recording of "The Serpent on the Crown," the 17th installment of Elizabeth Peters' Amelia Peabody Mysteries series" in Chelsea for Recorded Books. Rosenblat is an actress, but uses different skills when narrating a historical novel; Rosenblat "shift[ed] quickly between characters with British, Indian, Arabic, Egyptian, Irish, Austro-Hungarian and Texan accents. Those distinct roles interacted with incredulity, shock, anguish and sarcasm. It was emotion layered on dialect layered on perfect enunciation." Rosenblat explained that narrating a book means "having to do everything – I mean everything – with the voice. There is no upturned eyebrow, no body language." Rosenblat has narrated all the novels in the Amelia Peabody series.

== See also ==
- List of characters in the Amelia Peabody series
