= List of Amelia Peabody characters =

The Amelia Peabody series of historical mystery novels is written by Elizabeth Peters, set in Victorian Egypt among a family of eccentric archaeologists.

== Entirely fictional ==
=== The Emerson family ===
Amelia Peabody Emerson
The matriarch, sleuth, and fervent pyramidophile. Nicknamed "Sitt Hakim" ("Lady Doctor").
Professor Radcliffe Archibald Emerson (Note: The professor´s middle name is given in The Last Camel Died at Noon.)
Amelia's husband, "The greatest Egyptologist of this or any other era." Nicknamed "Abu Shitaim" ("Father of Curses").
Walter Peabody "Ramses" Emerson
Amelia and Radcliffe's only child, born around July 1887. (Note: It is stated in Guardian of the Horizon that "Ramses had just celebrated his twentieth birthday" at the end of July 1907.) He is first described as "catastrophically precocious", since he is intellectually gifted but finds social interactions difficult. He is later dubbed "Akhu el-Efreet" ("Brother of Demons"), and grows up to become a renowned philologist like his uncle.
Nefret Forth Emerson
Daughter of Willoughby Forth, born 15 April 1884. (Note: Nefret´s birth date and age are stated in The Last Camel Died at Noon.) Raised until the age of 13 in a lost Meroitic civilization, where she and her father were forced to remain (The Last Camel Died at Noon). Adopted by the Emersons and later married to Ramses. Nicknamed "Nur Misur" (Light of Egypt).
Professor Walter Emerson (Note: In chapter 2 of The Last Camel Died at Noon, it is implied that Walter also has the title ´Professor´.)
Emerson's younger brother, the world-famous philologist. Married to Evelyn.
Evelyn Forbes Emerson
Amelia's dearest friend, who has a heart of gold and nerves of steel. Wife of Professor Walter Emerson.
Amelia "Lia" Emerson Todros
Daughter of Walter and Evelyn, named for Amelia Peabody, born around 1890. (Note: In The Mummy Case, Lia is said to be four years old in June 1894.) She defies convention to marry David Todros (in The Falcon at the Portal).
David Todros
Abdullah's grandson, adopted by Walter and Evelyn. A natural artist and Ramses' partner in mischief, David first appears in The Hippopotamus Pool.
James Peabody
Amelia's eldest and least favorite brother, father of Percy and Violet. Referred to in Crocodile on the Sandbank, first seen in Deeds of the Disturber.
Percival "Percy" Peabody
Decidedly unpleasant nephew of Amelia and son of James. First seen in Deeds of the Disturber; killed off in He Shall Thunder in the Sky.
Sennia Emerson
Percy's illegitimate daughter by a Cairo prostitute, abandoned by her father and later used by him in an attempt to discredit Ramses. She is adopted by the Emersons. Called "Little Bird." First appears in The Falcon at the Portal.
Seth Emerson, a.k.a. Sethos
Illegitimate half-brother of Professor Radcliffe Emerson. Alternately known as "The Master Criminal." First appeared in The Mummy Case. Discovered to be related to Emerson in He Shall Thunder in the Sky. Father of Maryam (Molly) (see also Enemies)
Charlotte "Charla" Emerson
Ramses' and Nefret's daughter, named for Amelia's mother. Twin sister of David John.
David John "Davy" Emerson
Ramses' and Nefret's son, named for David Todros and Evelyn and Walter's son, John, who died in the First World War. Twin brother of Charlotte.
Abdullah "Dolly" Todros
David's and Lia's son, named for David's grandfather. Older brother of Evelyn.
Evelyn "Evvie" Todros
David's and Lia's daughter, named for Lia's mother. Nicknamed Sekhmet for her "lion-colored mane of hair and her explosive temper." Younger sister of Abdullah.

=== The Emersons' staff and work crew ===
Abdullah ibn Hassan al Wahhab
The Emersons' loyal reis (foreman), who leads the excavations with Emerson. Devoted to Emerson, and initially resentful of Amelia ("Every year, another dead body!"), he eventually becomes just as devoted to her, and dies heroically defending her life (The Ape Who Guards the Balance). Reappears to Amelia in clairvoyant dreams; David and Lia's first child is named for him.
Selim
Abdullah's youngest son, friend of Ramses, with a technical mind and an eye for the ladies. When he grows up, he takes his father, Abdullah's, place as reis. Has two wives, Rabia and Taghrid.
Daoud
Abdullah's nephew, a giant of a man whose simple observations help solve mysteries and protect his friends. He adores Lia, David's wife, and his faith in Amelia's abilities verges on religious awe.
Fatima
(First introduced in The Ape Who Guards the Balance) Abdullah's daughter-in-law, the widow of one of his deceased sons. After her husband dies, she asks Amelia for a position of independence, and becomes the Emersons' dedicated housekeeper in Egypt, and enjoys learning to read and write.
Kadija
Daoud's wife. Born of a Nubian mother, whose dark coloring she shares, and stronger than many men. Keeps the secret recipe for the famous "green ointment" prescribed as a cure-all by all members of Abdullah's family.
Gargery
The Emersons' butler. Accompanies the Emersons on some of their later expeditions, acting as Sennia's bodyguard. Has been known to wield a cudgel to defend his employers.
Rose
The Emersons' housekeeper in Kent, completely devoted to Ramses.
Bassima
Sennia's Nanny. First appeared in The Falcon at the Portal.

=== Cats ===
Bastet
The matriarch of the long line of companions; she and Ramses have a deep bond with one another. After her death at a ripe old age (noted in Seeing a Large Cat), it will take Ramses years before he even considers accepting another feline companion. Almost always referred to as 'the cat Bastet'. She first appears in The Curse of the Pharaohs.
Anubis
Originally belonged to the villainous Vincey but eventually bonds with Emerson, and fathers a large brood with Bastet. First appears in The Snake, the Crocodile, and the Dog.
Sekhmet
Called "the furry blob" by Ramses, she later defects to live a life of luxury with the Vandergelts. First appears in Seeing a Large Cat.
Horus
Bonds originally with Nefret but later defects to Sennia. They are the only two people he will tolerate. First appears in The Ape Who Guards the Balance.
Seshat
First appears in The Falcon at the Portal; prefers Ramses.
The Great Cat of Re
Brought to the family, as a small kitten, by Horus; loyal to Ramses. Makes it plain he refuses to commute back and forth to England and remains resident at the Emerson's house at Thebes. First appears in The Golden One.

=== Horses ===
Risha
(Arabic, "feather") Silver-gray stallion, a gift to Ramses from a sheik friend of the Emersons, who fathers a large family of mounts for the rest of the family.
Asfur
(Arabic, "bird") Mare, a gift to David from the same sheik.
Moonlight
Mare, a daughter of Risha and Asfur, belongs to Nefret.
Melusine
Filly, appears in Children of the Storm

=== Dogs ===
Narmer
A "large, homely yellow dog", adopted by Nefret in The Falcon at the Portal. He initially barks at everything, including scorpions and spiders, but Nefret has hopes of training him to be a watchdog. His name is that of the first king of Upper and Lower Egypt
Amira
A "large tawny beast" which Daoud acquires at Ramses' request in The Serpent on the Crown to guard against unwanted visitors and to protect Charla and David John. Enormous but extremely submissive. Her name is Arabic for "princess."

=== Friends ===
Cyrus Vandergelt
Courtly American millionaire who longs for a rich find but finds loyal friends instead. First appears in The Curse of the Pharaohs.
Katherine Whitney-Jones Vandergelt
A schoolteacher, widowed after an unhappy marriage, who becomes a semi-fraudulent spiritual medium to support her two children. After her unmasking in Egypt, she and Cyrus fall in love. First appears in Seeing a Large Cat.
Bertie Vandergelt
Katherine Vandergelt's son by her first marriage, whom Cyrus later adopts and who comes to Egypt after being wounded and discharged during World War I; he proves invaluable both as an ally and an excavator. First appears in Lord of the Silent.
Anna Vandergelt
Katherine Vandergelt's daughter by her first marriage, whom Cyrus later adopts and who expresses interest in becoming a nurse at the outbreak of war. First appears in He Shall Thunder in the Sky.
Kevin O'Connell
An Irish reporter for the London Daily Yell, in whom "the journalist and the gentleman are always at war." He dogs the Emersons' steps for a story, but also pitches in when the crime-fighting gets tough. First appears in The Curse of the Pharaohs.
Margaret Minton
A female reporter (one of the few), with even fewer scruples than O'Connell. Bears a striking resemblance to Amelia. First appears in Deeds of the Disturber as O'Connell's professional rival, and subsequently develops a crush on Radcliffe Emerson. Later marries Seth Emerson.
Karl von Bork
A young German archaeologist who first appears in The Curse of the Pharaohs, marries the daughter of one of the suspects, and appears periodically in other stories.
Donald Fraser
Young English nobleman who first appears in Lion in the Valley using the alias "Nemo", an upright man who loses himself in the Cairo underground while searching for his scoundrel brother. He is rescued by the Emersons, and marries Enid Debenham, his childhood sweetheart. Reappears in Seeing a Large Cat.
Enid Debenham Fraser
Young Englishwoman who first appears in Lion in the Valley masquerading as a female archaeologist while searching Egypt for Donald. Begins a friendship with Ramses when he is still a child. Reappears in Seeing a Large Cat.
Jumana
A young Egyptian woman who aspires to be an archaeologist, and whom the Emersons strive to help achieve her goal in spite of others' prejudices. First appears in Lord of the Silent. As of the end of Tomb of the Golden Bird, she and Bertie are engaged. Daughter of Abdullah's brother Yusuf; sister of Jamil.
Maryam
Sethos's daughter by Bertha. First appears in He Shall Thunder in the Sky using the pseudonym Melinda "Molly" Hamilton, with a crush on Ramses. Manipulated by her half-sister in Children of the Storm to aid in a scheme of robbery and revenge.
Sir Edward Washington
English aristocrat and photographer. First appears in The Hippopotamus Pool, employed by the Emersons as their staff photographer, and one of Nefret's many admirers. Re-appears in The Ape Who Guards the Balance, and The Golden One. He is eventually revealed to be one of Sethos's most trusted lieutenants.
The Honourable Algernon Bracegirdle-Boisdragon, aka "Smith"
Sometime case-officer for British Intelligence for Ramses and later Sethos.
Ibrahim El-Gharbi
Kingpin of the prostitution houses of Cairo, known for his flamboyant transvestism. Though the Emersons despise his profession, he is a useful source of information and aid in tight spots. First appears in He Shall Thunder in the Sky. In Children of the Storm provides a key clue when Peabody consults him in his forced exile.

=== Enemies ===
Sethos
Nom de crime of the shadowy "Master Criminal" first encountered in The Mummy Case, who harbors a desire to possess Amelia. Although he is included here under "Enemies", Sethos and the Emerson clan declare a sort of truce, when it is revealed that Sethos is Emerson's illegitimate half brother in He Shall Thunder in the Sky. He is a master of disguise, able to take on almost any personality. He specializes in stealing and selling artifacts, though eventually he uses these talents as an agent of British intelligence. Father of Maryam (Molly).
Bertha
Daughter of a German father and an Egyptian mother, she first appears in The Snake, the Crocodile, and the Dog as a henchwoman of the villainous Vincey, but later founds her own criminal gang, composed mostly of women. A formidable foe of the Emersons, she particularly hates Amelia, possibly in jealousy over Radcliffe and Sethos. After working briefly with Sethos, she becomes independent again. She is killed (The Ape Who Guards the Balance) after trying to assassinate Amelia. Mother of Maryam (Molly) and Justin.
Matilda
Bertha's bodyguard and right hand. Intelligent, ruthless, and terrifyingly strong.
"Justin"
Bertha's daughter by Vincey, aka Schlange, a prostitute and later a criminal mastermind in her own right. Adept at disguise; appears in Children of the Storm as a young, disturbed boy. Never reveals her true name. Dies when she blows up her dahabeeyah.
Jamil
Abdullah's nephew and Jumana's brother. Cunning but volatile. First appears in Lord of the Silent; dies in The Golden One.

== Based on real persons ==
=== Archaeologists ===
- Edward R. Ayrton
- James Henry Breasted
- E. A. Wallis Budge
- Émile Brugsch
- Harry Burton
- James Burton
- Lord Carnarvon
- Howard Carter
- Theodore M. Davis
- Eugène Grébaut
- Frank Griffith ("Griffiths")
- Jan Herman Insinger
- Pierre Lacau
- Gaston Maspero
- Jacques de Morgan
- Édouard Naville
- William Flinders Petrie
- James Quibell
- Annie Quibell
- George Andrew Reisner
- Archibald Sayce
- Arthur Weigall
- Herbert E. Winlock
- Leonard Woolley

=== Politicians and military officers ===
- Lord and Lady Allenby
- Lord Edward Cecil
- Evelyn Baring
- General Philip Chetwode
- Herbert Kitchener
- T. E. Lawrence
- Sir John Maxwell
- Baroness Emma Orczy
- Christabel Pankhurst
- Emmeline Pankhurst
- Rudolf Carl von Slatin
