= The Last Camel Died at Noon =

Novel by Elizabeth Peters

- Author: Elizabeth Peters
- Language: English
- Series: Amelia Peabody series mysteries
- Genre: Historical mystery
- Publisher: Warner Books
- Publication date: 1991
- Publication place: United States
- Media type: Print (paperback)
- Pages: xi, 352
- ISBN: 0-446-51483-7
- OCLC: 299743985
- Dewey Decimal: 813/.54 20
- LC Class: PS3563.E747 L37 1991
- Preceded by: Deeds of the Disturber
- Followed by: The Snake, the Crocodile, and the Dog

The Last Camel Died at Noon is the sixth in a series of historical mystery novels, written by Elizabeth Peters and featuring fictional sleuth and archaeologist Amelia Peabody. It was first published in 1991. This story in the historical mystery series has a new genre; Last Camel satirizes adventure novels in the tradition of Henry Rider Haggard. One reviewer considered this an homage to Haggard. The story is set in the 1897–1898 dig season, partly in Egypt, then moving west to Sudan.

== Plot summary ==
At home in autumn 1897, the Emersons are surprised by a visit from a young man, Reggie Forthright, followed by his grandfather Viscount Blacktower. The viscount wishes the Emersons to locate his elder son, explorer Willoughby Forth (uncle of Reggie Forthright). Forth and his wife disappeared fourteen years ago in the desert west of the Nile in the Sudan, but the viscount has just received a letter on papyrus (delivered by unknown means), which appears to be a call for rescue from the Forths. The letter is accompanied by a map giving directions to a lost oasis, which was shown by Forth to Professor Emerson just before he vanished without trace. Meanwhile, Reggie tries to persuade the Emersons that the quest is hopeless. Professor Emerson dismisses both visitors, refusing to have anything to do with the quest. After their departure, shots are heard outside the home of the Emersons, who find a pool of blood in the grounds. This remains unexplained, since enquiries show that both Blacktower and Reggie reached home safely.

Professor Emerson announces his intention of Napata in Nubia, the original capital of the Kushite civilisation. They make their way along the River Nile and by camel to excavate at the pyramids of Nuri, a locality at Napata. The sudden appearance of Reggie Forthright at their dig causes them to alter their plans. Reggie announces his intentions of following the map to find his uncle, but after news comes that he has been captured by bandits, the Emersons are convinced that they need to follow and rescue him. Their journey becomes life-threatening after a few days when most of their men desert (taking the water), all their camels die, and Amelia falls desperately ill. The last remaining servant says he can run to the oasis a day ahead and bring water back. To their surprise he does so, and then escorts them to the Lost Oasis.

Amelia takes weeks to recover from her ordeal. On awakening, she is told that the servant who rescued them is actually Tarek, a royal prince, one of two heirs vying to succeed the recently deceased king of a Meroitic civilisation at the Lost Oasis. The civilisation was founded centuries earlier by survivors from the Kingdom of Kush, and its culture is based on Meroitic and ancient Egyptian culture. The ancient Egyptian gods are still worshipped, and the king will be appointed shortly by the choice of Amon-Re (Aminreh). The princes and some of the nobles and priests can speak English, which they learned from Willoughby Forth, whom they are told died a few months before the Emersons' arrival. The Emersons seek to find proof of his death, as well as the fate of his wife. In the meantime, they become involved in the power struggle between the princes, aligning themselves with Tarek. They are astounded to discover that the Forths had a daughter, Nefret, who is now thirteen years old and is high priestess of Isis. She pleads with them for help in escaping. In the meantime, Reggie (who has been a prisoner in the dungeons) re-appears, but the Emersons become increasingly suspicious of his motives.

All three Emersons are present at the temple ceremony which will make known Aminreh's choice of king. Tarek overpowers his brother's man inside the figure of the god, and inserts Ramses there, who makes known the god's choice of Tarek. The two brothers battle to the death and Tarek wins the crown. The Professor participates in the blood-soaked battle but is abducted. The victorious Tarek leads Amelia to her husband, who has been carried to the rooms of the priestess of Aminreh. Amelia realises to her shock that this woman is Forth's wife, who has gone mad and forgotten her identity. In a final struggle, the deranged Mrs Forth falls dead.

Tarek prepares a caravan for the Emersons to return to England and reveals that he had taken the letter and map to England so that Nefret would be returned to her people. His half-brother, who was with him, was killed when Reggie shot at them outside the Emersons' house. Tarek then returns to the Oasis. However, in a final showdown, Reggie appears and reveals that he had known all along the fate of his uncle. All of his actions had been to prevent the Emersons rescuing the Forths and cutting him out of his grandfather's fortune. He had done his best to sabotage the Emersons' journey, including poisoning their camels. However, as Reggie is about to shoot Ramses, Nefret knocks the gun aside, making the shot go wild. Reggie is left behind, tied up and disarmed. The Emersons and Nefret travel out, escorted by Tarek's men in the caravan to an oasis.

== New characters ==
Continuing characters introduced for the first time in this novel include Nefret Forth and Tarek, king of the Holy Mountain. Count Amenislo, the half-brother of Tarek, plays a very minor role in this novel but a much larger role in Guardian of the Horizon.

== Reviews ==
The title of this book is nearly identical to the first sentence of the 1981 thriller The Key to Rebecca by Ken Follett. The Last Camel Died at Noon most closely follows the tradition with plot elements like a lost and ancient civilization, a young English girl serving as its high priestess, an evil prince, a wronged noble prince who wants to free the slaves, kidnappings, escapes, mazes of tunnels (and palaces) hand-carved from cliffs.

Publishers Weekly considers Amelia Peabody to be very like Indiana Jones but in the Victorian Era, and likes the intricate plotting, as the author “laces her usual intricate plotting with Amelia's commonsense approach to hygiene and manners, and coyly delicate references to vigorously enjoyed connubial pleasures.”

Another reviewer noted the difference between this novel and those earlier in the series. “Going in an entirely different direction than her previous novels, this is Amelia Peabody does Indiana Jones, or, as the author herself says, H. Rider Haggard.”

The humor used by the author was noted. “[T]hose readers who have enjoyed the series as a whole will likely find the author’s tribute to Haggard to be a humorous one,”.

In his upbeat review of this novel, Peter Theroux in The New York Times said “It is enough to say that so rollicking and mythical are their adventures that comparisons must be made (and are made, in fact, by several characters in the book) with H. Rider Haggard's "King Solomon's Mines"; "The Last Camel" seems at times to be a homage to Haggard.” The story is told by Amelia Peabody Emerson “who travels like Alexander the Great but writes like Jane Austen, or sometimes the Brontes”. The author’s “wonderfully witty voice and her penchant for history lessons of the Nile” keep people reading about the “delightful Emersons”. Further, ”Egyptian verisimilitude is one of Elizabeth Peters's strong points; she is, after all, a traveler and Egyptologist herself.”

== Awards ==
The novel was nominated for an Agatha Award in the "Best Novel" category in 1992.

== See also ==
- List of characters in the Amelia Peabody series
