= The Snake, the Crocodile, and the Dog =

Novel by Elizabeth Peters (aka Barbara Mertz)

- Author: Elizabeth Peters
- Language: English
- Series: Amelia Peabody series mysteries
- Genre: Historical mystery
- Publisher: Warner Books
- Publication date: 1992
- Publication place: United States
- Media type: Print (hardback & paperback)
- Pages: x, 340
- ISBN: 0-446-51585-X
- OCLC: 25788415
- Dewey Decimal: 813/.54 20
- LC Class: PS3563.E747 S57 1992
- Preceded by: The Last Camel Died at Noon
- Followed by: The Hippopotamus Pool

The Snake, the Crocodile, and the Dog is the seventh in a series of historical mystery novels, written by Elizabeth Peters and featuring fictional archaeologist and sleuth Amelia Peabody. It was first published in 1992. The story is set in the summer of 1898 in England and the 1898–1899 archaeological dig season in Egypt.

== Plot summary ==
After returning from their adventure at the Lost Oasis, the Emersons try to get Nefret, their new ward, integrated into English country life. She has difficulty with the immaturity and meanness of girls her age, but is determined to learn the ways of her newly adopted culture. Nefret decides she will stay in England to study while the Emersons return to Egypt as usual in the fall, and Walter and Evelyn Emerson glady take her in. Ramses also decides to stay in England, as his crush on Nefret becomes more obvious to his mother, but to no one else.

Amelia and the Professor sail east to the place where they met, Amarna—the complete clearing of an entire archaeological site. Amelia's hopes that this new project will be a second honeymoon for them are soon dashed. First she is abducted and rescued by Emerson. Then Emerson is attacked and kidnapped—but no ransom demand or explanation is forthcoming. Amelia, Abdullah, and their circle of friends scour Luxor for any sign of Emerson, with the help of Cyrus Vandergelt, who appears on the scene just when Amelia needs him most.

When Adbullah finally finds Emerson imprisoned in a backyard shed, Amelia finds out that his captor wants information about their previous season's travels and the possibility of a lost Meroitic civilization with artifacts and treasures to exploit.

Unfortunately for the kidnapper, Emerson is the victim of amnesia and does not know anything about the Lost Oasis. Unfortunately for Amelia, it turns out Emerson does not remember her either—and is just as annoyed by her as when they first met. (See Crocodile on the Sandbank.)

Back in England, Ramses and Nefret are targeted for abduction, with each attempt thwarted by Evelyn and Walter, and by the two victims. Ramses' harrowing letters do not add to Amelia's peace of mind. Meanwhile, Cyrus is beginning to look at Amelia with more affection than she wants, going so far as to propose marriage. She rejects him, and he continues to assist her. Two troubles are tied to a symbolic snake and crocodile. The dog is real, howling in pain in a house they pass en route to a dig. Emerson lets the dog out, though Amelia sees it as a trap; she blocks the dog from her husband and it bites her. They fear the dog is rabid; Emerson cauterizes the bite on her foot. Others pursue the dog to find it had been tortured not rabid; it was a trap. Amelia is carried often as her foot is painful and slow to heal.

Emerson sets up a trap to lure his attacker. From the abduction, he knows it is Vincey. Cyrus is armed and supplies two armed guards. They meet in a cave, Emerson, Amelia, Cyrus, and Vincey, with guns. Amelia and Emerson each want to shield the other. Emerson shoots Vincey fatally, while Vincey turns, aiming at the fast moving Amelia but killing Cyrus. Cyrus's guards had not guarded; instead they blocked Abdullah from responding to the initial attack outside the cave.

Afterwards, in Luxor, the real Cyrus appears, having been kidnapped by the Master Criminal, Sethos, who now lies dead in the cave. The Emersons had been fighting against two enemies, both now vanquished. Emerson has slowly recovered his memories of the lost 13 years, and knows Amelia for his wife. Their son sends a letter saying he and the butler will arrive shortly in Egypt.

== Reviews ==
Kirkus Reviews liked the novel's action, the redoubtable Amelia, and the setting in Egypt, but considered the plot bloated, with "excessive verbiage".

Publishers Weekly was more upbeat, judging that "Amelia, beset by doubt but undaunted, is in top form as Peters supplies a surprise ending to cap her surefire entertainment."

Frederick Busch, writing in The New York Times, reviews this with two other modern novels set in the 19th century. He considers the three to be "literary tourism in which we're entertained by interesting times." The reader is not challenged to rethink present views of life: the quaint hotel fully modernized. For this novel, he admires the narration, "Often enough, her narration is clever"; the novel includes "interesting Egyptian and archeological lore, lots of danger and, if you like Amelia, there's plenty of her."

== Title ==
The title refers to an Egyptian fairy tale which Amelia is in the process of translating, called "The Doomed Prince", in which a young prince is destined to be killed by one of the three animals mentioned.

== Awards ==
The novel was nominated for an Agatha Award in the "Best Novel" category in 1992.

== See also ==
- List of characters in the Amelia Peabody series
