= The Curse of the Pharaohs (novel) =

Book by Barbara Mertz

- First edition cover for The Curse of the Pharaohs
- Author: Elizabeth Peters
- Language: English
- Series: Amelia Peabody series mysteries
- Genre: Historical mystery
- Publisher: Dodd, Mead and Company
- Publication date: 1981
- Publication place: United States
- Media type: Print (hardback & paperback)
- Pages: 357
- ISBN: 0-396-07963-6
- OCLC: 7171397
- Dewey Decimal: 813/.54 19
- LC Class: PS3563.E747 C8
- Preceded by: Crocodile on the Sandbank
- Followed by: The Mummy Case

The Curse of the Pharaohs is a historical mystery novel by Elizabeth Peters, first published in 1981 and the second in the Amelia Peabody series of novels; it takes place in the excavation season of 1892–1893.

== Plot summary ==
The Emersons are at home in Kent, England; Emerson is a professor, teaching and writing a book, and they are raising their young son Ramses. Ramses is a precocious 4-year-old who can identify a bone as the femur of an animal. Lady Baskerville arrives in Kent and asks them to finish the excavation started by her husband Lord Henry Baskerville, who died mysteriously just before opening a tomb in Luxor.

They spend Christmas with Walter and Evelyn and their children at Chalfont House; Emerson and Amelia travel the next day, leaving Ramses with his cousins. They arrive in Cairo, hearing talk of the curse of the pharaohs. Reporter Kevin O'Connell of the Daily Yell, inventor of the curse, introduces himself.

The Emersons arrive at the Baskerville compound near the Valley of the Kings. Cyrus Vandergelt, a wealthy American who is an amateur Egyptologist, feels a duty to the Baskervilles and much curiosity about the dig. He joins the crew and develops a respectful relationship with the Emersons. They settle into the expedition house, where Lady Baskerville joins them. Alan Armadale, who was the lead archaeologist, has gone missing shortly after Lord Baskerville´s death. The other members of the archaeological team are Karl von Bork (a young German epigrapher) and Charles Milverton (the photographer). Later in the novel, old and obnoxious Madame Berengaria and her artist daughter Mary also move into the expedition house.

The night guard Hassan sees a white-clothed apparition in the compound and is subsequently found murdered. Emerson locates the thief Ali, who sluggishly leads Amelia, Abdullah and O'Connell to the body of Armadale, which the cat Bastet is watching. Abdullah returns to the house with the body of Armadale, while Amelia and O'Connor arrive at the tomb in time to interrupt an attack by Ali´s comrades. Armadale's forehead is marked with a serpent symbol, as was that of Lord Baskerville. It appears that both were murdered, but examination of their bodies gives no clue as to how.

Milverton tells Amelia that he is under an assumed name; he is Arthur, the nephew of Lord Baskerville, heir to his title. The next day, they find Arthur near death, hit on the head and shoved under his bed. Arthur had not introduced himself as his nephew before his uncle died.

The servants in the house and the workers at the tomb all go on strike after Armadale's body is seen in the house. Amelia and Emerson get them working again. Amelia gets Daoud, nephew to Abdullah, to guard Arthur's sick room. Amelia ponders who is murdering and why. Lady Baskerville falls apart under the tensions; Cyrus steps up to propose marriage to the new widow. Madame Berengaria appears, drunk and demanding breakfast.

Emerson announces he will guard the tomb overnight. Amelia heads out there, expecting the murderer to attempt killing Emerson, and catches Lady Baskerville in the act. Lady Baskerville had had affairs with other men; her husband threatened divorce, so she murdered him with a hat pin. She killed Armadale, whom she had seduced, and Hassan next. She attacked Arthur in his sleep, as she knew his true identity and encouraged his secrecy. She was interrupted before she could finish. Vandergelt relates how she still expects him to marry her. He declines.

Madame Berengaria died from drink, laced with opium by Lady Baskerville. She had related the story of two brothers, a fairy tale from ancient Egypt, featuring an unfaithful wife.

Mary accepts Karl's proposal of marriage, marrying soon after in Luxor. Arthur is the next Lord Baskerville. Two months later, the Emersons head home, with Bastet the cat and their share of the tomb goods, the many non-kingly mummies they uncovered. They plan to work next season, with their son.

== New characters ==
Continuing characters introduced for the first time in this novel include the Emersons´ son Ramses, Wilkins the butler, Rose the parlourmaid, Daoud (nephew of the Emersons´ reis Abdullah), American millionaire Cyrus Vandergelt, journalist Kevin O´Connell and the cat Bastet.

== Reviews ==
Kirkus Reviews found the main character, Amelia, improved in this "delicious" adventure following the first novel. The author is "at her giddy best here" with energy and high spirits. They conclude: "So, for mystery-comedy fans: an all-frills period charmer."

== See also ==
- List of characters in the Amelia Peabody series
