= Radcliffe Emerson =

- Amelia Peabody series character
- First appearance: Crocodile on the Sandbank; 1975
- Created by: Elizabeth Peters

In-universe information
- Title: Professor
- Occupation: Egyptologist
- Spouse: Amelia Peabody
- Children: Walter "Ramses" Emerson

Professor Radcliffe Archibald Emerson (born 1855), M.A. Ox., D.C.L. (Ox.), L.L.D. (Edinburgh), F.B.A., FRS, FRGS, MAPS, Fellow of the Royal Society, Fellow of the Royal Geographical Society, Member of the American Philosophical Society, is one of the main characters in the Amelia Peabody historical mystery series by author Elizabeth Peters. He is an Egyptologist who is typically addressed as Professor, although he hates his first name and prefers to be called "Emerson." For his explosive temper and dynamic use of language, his Egyptian friends and employees have nicknamed him Abu Shitaim, "Father of Curses".

Emerson is the husband of Amelia Peabody, the Egyptologist and self-proclaimed detective, and they are the parents of Walter ("Ramses") Emerson.

== Personal history ==
Very little of Emerson's life story is revealed until He Shall Thunder in the Sky.

His mother was Lady Isabel Courtenay, daughter of the Earl of Radcliffe (one possible reason he hates his first name). His father, Thomas Emerson, was a good-hearted but easygoing man who failed to satisfy his cold-hearted, ambitious wife. Their marriage had become loveless by the time Radcliffe was born, and after his father died, his mother did her best to "shape" Radcliffe into her ideal of a man, which he vehemently resisted. A small inheritance from a distant relative enabled him to escape his mother's control, and the aristocratic marriage she had arranged for him, and pursue his studies as an Egyptologist. His mother disowned him.

Radcliffe became an Egyptologist, while his younger brother Walter became a philologist. The two frequently led archaeological expeditions to Egypt, where Radcliffe was one of the first (and for a while, few) advocates of a methodological approach to archaeology.

In Crocodile on the Sandbank, during a visit to the Cairo museum, the Emersons encountered Amelia Peabody and her friend, Evelyn Forbes. Radcliffe and Amelia instantly butted heads in an argument, and she considered him a rude and patronizing boor. When Amelia visited the Emersons' dig in Amarna, however, Amelia found Radcliffe Emerson ill, and not only nursed him back to health, but also took over part of his duties. Grudgingly, he came to respect her abilities, and at the end, realized he was in love with her.

In the later books Amelia refers to Emerson as "the greatest Egyptologist of this or any other age."

A few years after his marriage and Ramses's birth, Emerson tried to make peace with his mother. She refused his attention, but was unable to prevent him from inheriting his grandfather's estate when she died.

== Appearance ==
When he first appears in Crocodile on the Sandbank, Emerson is described (by Amelia, thus romantically) as tall, well-muscled, with "sapphirine" eyes and dark, wavy black hair. In The Mummy Case, he is described as having Titian highlights in his hair. He prefers to wear a beard, as he is self-conscious about the dimple in his chin (which he calls a cleft), but Amelia, who hates the beard and adores the dimple, makes him shave it at the earliest possible opportunity. In Crocodile, Amelia also describes him as having a "very hairy" chest and body, but this reference is never made again.

== Character ==
Emerson is presented as a man of action. He is known to be short-tempered and irascible. His willingness to use violence is often enough to make him feared by all the petty criminals and crooked antiques dealers in Egypt.

Emerson remains unaware of his own character flaws. He considers himself the family’s only rational, even-tempered member and is a car and motorcycle enthusiast, despite his mechanical ineptitude. His reckless driving terrifies his family. He seizes every opportunity to disguise himself, especially with a false beard, though no one is ever fooled.

He is intolerant of bureaucracy and an advocate of careful methods of excavation and research. His methods are presented as a great contrast to those of well-known non-fictional archaeological adventurers, who can sometimes be found as minor characters in the books. More established and careful archaeologists, including William Flinders Petrie and Howard Carter, the discoverer and primary excavator of the tomb of Tutankhamun, are presented more positively.

The Emerson family adventures, to date, are set in Great Britain, Egypt and Palestine during the British Imperial period, beginning in approximately 1890 and extending through the 1920s.
