= The Golden One (novel) =

2002 novel by Elizabeth Peters

- First edition cover for The Golden One
- Author: Elizabeth Peters
- Language: English
- Series: Amelia Peabody series mysteries
- Genre: Historical mystery
- Publisher: William Morrow
- Publication date: 2002
- Publication place: United States
- Media type: Print
- Pages: 429
- ISBN: 0-380-97885-7
- OCLC: 48098520
- Dewey Decimal: 813/.54 21
- LC Class: PS3563.E747 G65 2002
- Preceded by: Lord of the Silent
- Followed by: Children of the Storm

The Golden One is the 14th in a series of historical mystery novels, written by Elizabeth Peters and featuring fictional sleuth and archaeologist Amelia Peabody. It was first published in 2002. The story is set in the 1916–1917 dig season in Egypt.

== Plot summary ==
There are two plot lines. The first story deals with the search for an unknown tomb whose artifacts have started to appear on the black market. The second story follows Ramses Emerson as he is sent on another mission behind Turkish lines.

After arriving in Egypt in January, 1917, Amelia acquires a magnificent cosmetic jar with the cartouche mainly rubbed off, strong evidence for the truth behind the rumors of a new, previously untouched tomb. After a brief stay in Cairo, the family moves on to their home in Luxor. They find a murdered man in a hard-to-reach cave in the area of the princess tombs. Selim figures it is Abdul Hassan, one of the group who found those tombs. Two of that original group of six are now dead. The locals admit that Jamil, not "one of us" tomb robbers, is the seventh.

They encounter Joe Albion and his family, a wealthy American collector of antiquities, who makes no secret of his desire to deal on the black market. Cyrus Vandergelt knows Albion and his ruthless ways; relations with the Albions are frosty.

Early in their excavations, the Emersons discover one looted shrine with links to Jamil, a former employee and Jumana's brother (Lord of the Silent). They learn that he is manipulating a number of people; he attempts to kill Emerson and Peabody in the shrine space. When Jamil's family confronts him, their ancient musket explodes, mortally wounding him and his father. As he dies, Jamil tells a clue to the location of the tomb – "in the hand of the God".

Ramses is called back into service as an agent. An English spy, claiming to have converted to Islam, has become a tool of the Turks and is now known as Ismail, the Holy Infidel. Ramses is sent to discover if the turncoat is Sethos. Ismail is in Gaza, just inside the Turkish lines. Ramses is forced to take a novice agent named Chetwode from the army with him as well, getting into Gaza without much trouble. While trying to see Ismail, Chetwode fires at Ismail and misses. In the confusion, Ramses is caught while the guilty Chetwode escapes.

The head of the Turkish secret service, Sahin Pasha, takes possession of Ramses, and makes a surprising offer: convert to Islam and marry his daughter, Esin, and he will set Ramses free. While Ramses considers the offer in a dungeon, Esin engineers Ramses' escape.

The Emersons arrive in a town just behind the British lines. Ramses appears in army uniform. Then Sethos appears with Esin in a rug. He was indeed Ismail, sent to destroy Sahin Pasha. Though he succeeded, his job as a spy is not done and he returns to Gaza.

The Emersons deal with an army major and soon see Sahin appear from a hiding space, hoping to regain his status by returning with both his daughter and Ramses. He wounds Ramses; Emerson captures Sahin, and they all return to Cairo. Sahin Pasha is turned over to the authorities, and Esin is brought to a secure home.

When the Emersons return to Luxor, they concoct a story that spills no government secrets. It bears some resemblance to previous adventures, so it is accepted.

The tomb is still undiscovered. The Albions are making it clear that nothing will stop them from getting what they want, and they seek to abuse Jumana's trust as one means of doing so. When Jumana is caught by Peabody sneaking into the compound one night, Peabody assumes the worst and decides to harshly punish her.

That morning, Cyrus and Bertie appear with exciting news. Bertie, with help from Jumana, has found the tomb in the hills above Deir el Medina, near a rock formation that looked like a fist, the "Hand of the God". It is a royal cache, containing the mummies and funerary times of four of the Wives of the God. Peabody realizes her mistake about Jumana and is contrite about jumping to conclusions.

Sethos reappears and warns Emerson against the Albions. The Albions try force when their first attempt to take the artifacts fails. The Emersons and Vandergelts ambush the Albions and their hired thugs. Caught by Emerson and Vandergelt, the Albions are forced to give up the items they had bought from Jamil, and then leave Luxor.

Ramses and Nefret are going to have a baby in September, topping the excitement in the Emerson families.

== Title ==
The title of the book refers to the goddess Hathor:

We praise the Golden One, the Lady of Heaven, Lady of Fragrance, Eye of the Sun, the Great Goddess, Mistress of All the Gods, Lady of Turquoise, Mistress of Joy, Mistress of Music ... that she may give us fine children, happiness, and a good husband.

— Epithets of Hathor, compiled from various sources, from the front matter of The Golden One

== Reviews ==
Publishers Weekly expected this novel to please the fans of the series as "another amusing if wordy Egyptian archeology mystery" with two plots. In overview, "Peters's books divide the mystery-reading public. With a Ph.D. in Egyptology from the University of Chicago, she provides an authentic historical backdrop. However, her long-winded explanations and preposterous plots frustrate many."

The Albany Herald said the characters in this series "remain fresh because Peters allows the hands of time to mold" them. They did note that "Keeping up gets a bit cumbersome at times, especially since many encounters involve characters in disguise."

Mary Campbell, writing for Associated Press and appearing in many newspapers, said of this novel, "Among the charms of the books in this series are Amelia's personality and the words she uses to express herself." On the other hand, "At 429 pages, her new novel might seem too long. But she can even make descriptions of mundane sifting of earth interesting, and her writing is splendidly arch – for readers who find that fun."

== Awards ==
The novel was nominated for an Agatha Award in the "Best Novel" category in 2002.

== See also ==
- List of characters in the Amelia Peabody series
