= Lion in the Valley =

Novel by Elizabeth Peters (aka Barbara Mertz)

- Paperback cover of Lion in the Valley
- Author: Elizabeth Peters
- Language: English
- Series: Amelia Peabody series mysteries
- Genre: Historical mystery
- Publisher: Atheneum
- Publication date: 1986
- Publication place: United States
- Media type: Print (hardback & paperback)
- Pages: 291 (paperback edition)
- ISBN: 0-689-11619-5 (paperback edition)
- OCLC: 415733133
- Dewey Decimal: 813/.54 19
- LC Class: PS3563.E747 L56 1986
- Preceded by: The Mummy Case
- Followed by: Deeds of the Disturber

Lion in the Valley is the fourth novel in a series of historical mystery novels, written by Elizabeth Peters and featuring fictional sleuth and archaeologist Amelia Peabody. It was first published in 1986. The story is set in the 1895–1896 dig season in Egypt.

== Plot summary ==
The Emersons, including son Ramses now 8 years old, return in 1895–1896 dig season to excavate at Dahshoor, Egypt with real pyramids for Amelia.

In looking for a keeper for Ramses, they find a demoralized Englishman who first answers to Nemo, who rescues Ramses from abductors as the family walks up a pyramid. Nemo is later revealed to be Donald Fraser. Donald has a hashish habit, which Amelia reforms. He tells her that the Cairo underworld refer to the master or Sethos, the Master Criminal. Sethos is a name related to the ancient Egyptian god Set or Seth, of deserts, disorder and violence.

Enid Debenham, socialite and heiress to her father's fortune, scandalizes Cairo society by associating with the Russian prince Kalinescheff. He is brutally murdered in Enid's hotel room, which sends her seeking a safe place until the police stop considering her as a suspect. She joins the Emersons, nominally as part of the dig.

Enid knows Donald since childhood, and knows his major flaw: he takes blame for the errors of his younger brother, Ronald. In their adulthood, Ronald takes advantage of this, so that Donald loses his army commission for his brother's crime. Amelia urges Donald to end this practice, and to be direct with Enid, whom he loves. Donald goes to meet Ronald before dawn one day; Amelia hears him leave and follows him. Ronald never appears but a gunshot does. Neither is killed by it.

The next morning, Amelia trips over Ronald's dead body, as she leaves the tent at dawn. Ramses finds the gun that killed him, so the police will not, and Amelia hides it. How the police, steaming up the Nile, know of this death without the Emersons reporting it is strange. The police arrest Donald, so he and Enid are taken to Cairo. The Emersons follow.

In Cairo, at the hotel, Emerson and Ramses get a message to meet the private detective Tobias Gregson who once met Amelia; they depart. Then Viscount Everly sees Amelia and Enid at the hotel. He tells them how he noticed Ronald missing from his usual club, and reported that to the Cairo police, reported it yesterday.

The Master Criminal appears in many disguises, male and female, to Amelia, so that he sees her every day since her arrival in Egypt. He is to blame for the abduction of Ramses. He returns the vessels valued by the local Coptic church, which he took last season, because he read in a newspaper that Amelia was not pleased with their theft. He poses as a private detective, an obnoxious American woman tourist, wanting to see the pyramids, and as Viscount Everly.

His last encounter with her is by abducting her from the hotel in Cairo for an in-person meeting. This "brilliant and tormented man" is a major test for Amelia. She notices the color of his eyes, one of the most difficult aspects to disguise. She figures out to put something personal (her pink flannel and a pendant from Emerson) out the window shutters, in hopes her husband and son will see it and rescue her. She learns that Sethos is in love with her. He confesses to killing Ronald Fraser; Sethos kills him because Ronald shot at his brother Donald while Amelia was next to him. He confesses to having Kalinescheff killed, no longer a reliable person in the organization Sethos leads. He insists she wear clothing of his choice, too much like a harem for her taste. His wooing does not gain him much, except to hear her speak of her husband.

Their encounter ends by the arrival of Emerson in the room with Amelia and Sethos. Emerson first fights off the tall guard, leaving him to Ramses and a group of police officers. Emerson and Sethos fight one-on-one, over Amelia. The fight ends by Sethos slipping out of the room via a movable marble wall.

Emerson tells Amelia how the cat Bastet remembered Sethos, who had fed her chicken during one encounter, and recognizes his scent, confirming they were at the right place; then they look up to see the pink flannel.

Ramses finds some of Sethos's devices for changing his appearance. He takes them home.

Donald and Enid marry.

At the dig, Amelia receives a note from Sethos promising he will no longer bother her or her family. "You might have redeemed me" is his opening line. Once it is read aloud, Emerson tears the note in pieces. Their marriage is solid.

== Explanation of the novel's title ==
The title is taken from the Battle of Kadesh Inscriptions of King Ramses II, in reference to the god Set:

"Lord of fear, great of fame,
In the hearts of all the lands.
Great of awe, rich in glory,
As is Set upon his mountain. ...
Like a wild lion in a valley of goats."

== Reference to real persons ==
Ramses, 8-year-old son of Amelia, refers to Arthur Conan Doyle, author of the Sherlock Holmes short stories and novels. The stories and characters were popular at the time of this novel's setting in the middle of the 1890s. Amelia has not read Conan Doyle's short stories or novels, and is thus again fooled by Sethos in disguise. His private detective uses the name of police detective Tobias Gregson, scorned by the clever main character Holmes. Even when Ramses was allowed to tell her, Amelia did not believe that the person she met was not trustworthy, and likely the Master Criminal in disguise.

Ramses— "But Mama, I have tried over and over to tell you—Tobias Gregson is the name of the police officer in the detective stories by Arthur Conan Doyle. I put it to you that it would be typical of the strange sense of humor of the man known as Sethos to select as a pseudonym the name of the character Mr Sherlock Holmes—the most famous private investigator in modern fiction—despised as a bungler and a fool." ... "I will not permit that accusatory tone, Ramses" I exclaimed. ... Mr Gregson was working undercover.”

== Reviews ==
Kirkus Reviews found this novel, with its murders and young love, to be "Loaded with wit, irony, Egyptian lore, Victorian mores, good-humored flamboyance and solid entertainment." The main character, feisty Amelia, copes with a lot, and most interestingly, when finding herself the "madly desired object of the supercriminal's machinations".

== See also ==
- List of characters in the Amelia Peabody series
