= The Deeds of the Disturber =

Novel by Elizabeth Peters (aka Barbara Mertz)

Deeds of the Disturber
- Paperback cover for Deeds of the Disturber
- Author: Elizabeth Peters
- Language: English
- Series: Amelia Peabody series mysteries
- Genre: Historical mystery
- Publisher: Atheneum Press
- Publication date: 1988
- Publication place: United States
- Media type: Print (hardback & paperback)
- Pages: 289
- ISBN: 0-689-11907-0
- OCLC: 17264313
- Dewey Decimal: 813/.54 19
- LC Class: PS3563.E747 D4 1988
- Preceded by: Lion in the Valley
- Followed by: The Last Camel Died at Noon

Deeds of the Disturber is the fifth in a series of historical mystery novels, written by Elizabeth Peters and first published in 1988. It features fictional sleuth and archaeologist Amelia Peabody. This is the only book in the series which takes place entirely in England, mainly in London in Summer 1896.

== Explanation of the novel's title ==
The title of the book comes from the ancient Egyptian Hymn to Osiris from the Eighteenth Dynasty: "His sister was his protector / She who drives off the foe / Who foils the deeds of the disturber / By the power of her utterance."

== Plot summary ==
The Emersons return to smoggy London for spring and summer of 1896. Upon arrival at the dock, Amelia finds that her penurious eldest brother James wants to dump his two children, Percy and Violet, on the Emersons for a few months. Amelia and Emerson accept this situation. When in London, they stay in Chalfont House, owned by Evelyn and Walter Emerson.

Kevin O'Connell reports on a supposed curse on a mummy in the British Museum. He competes against a journalist at another newspaper, M. M. Minton. Both pester the Emersons for interviews about a problem at the British Museum. Margaret Minton is a woman reporter, which surprises Amelia. Emerson is surprised at Minton's similarity in appearance to his wife.

Cousins Ramses and Percy hate each other on sight, once the cousins are brought to the house in Kent. All of them head back to London after a week. Amelia takes a while to see past the superficial politeness of Percy, and how harshly he treats Ramses. Violet cooperates with Percy. Ramses' belongings often become Percy's possessions.

The museum's night watchman, Albert Gore, lies dead in the mummy exhibit, with party debris scattered around his body. Then another employee, Jonas Oldacre, is found dead at the obelisk near the Thames. The Emersons and the police seek the links between those employees and an odd character dressed as an ancient Egyptian Sem priest, wearing a wig and with his face masked, who occasionally disrupts museum visitors.

Ramses tries out new identities, using what he took from Sethos in Cairo. He stands as a street urchin in front of Chalfont House. His mother takes the set away from Ramses.

At a museum event after Oldacre is found, Lord St John reveals that Margaret Minton is the granddaughter of a duke, who got her job by influence, which angers her; later, it becomes clear that she must work as the family has no money.

Then Minton disappears. After nearly a week, Amelia realizes that Minton has been working as a housemaid, unrecognized, in Chalfont House, getting her news dispatches out at night, printed without her byline.

The police hold Ahmet, an Egyptian, as a suspect. Amelia learns from him of an Egyptian opium den. She and Emerson visit it. The woman in charge recognizes Emerson; jealousy seriously infects Amelia and impairs her open conversation with Emerson. She visits Ayesha, owner of the opium den. She knew Emerson in Egypt.

The young Earl of Liverpool is ill with syphilis, unlikely to continue his ancient family line. His older friend and mentor Lord St John helps him. The aristocrats put their faith in mummy powder, made from ancient mummies, to cure his disease. It does not work.

There was a mummy in that coffin, but it had already been unwrapped, which is why the group creates a scene with six men dressed as Sem priests who swirl about, when the coffin is to be opened before a crowd. The crowd leaves the coffin and the bones in pieces. Police restore order, but the damage is done and the costumed men fade into the crowd.

The Earl of Liverpool invites Amelia and Emerson to see the collection of Egyptian antiquities acquired by his father. They have lunch there the day after the disrupted event at the museum, and they see the extensive Mauldy Manor, with its very old sections and more modern portion.

Lured out for a midnight meeting, Amelia, trailed by Emerson, sees Ayesha fatally shot, trying to protect Amelia after Emerson is grazed by a bullet. The killer disappears in the darkness. Amelia owns up to her jealousy.

Before her death, Ayesha tells Amelia that the aristocrats plan an event at Mauldy Manor. Emerson, then Amelia head to the Manor. Unknown to her, Ramses is on the back of the carriage. Amelia breaks in to the Manor and finds the meeting. Minton is carried in, dosed with opium; the high priest tells her that her lover is here. He means the Earl, but the Earl rejects her. The Earl of Liverpool is shot dead by the high priest of the ceremony, Eustace Wilson. A struggle ensues. They all leave the room, save the three uninvited.

Amelia, Emerson, and Inspector Cuff of Scotland Yard are trapped in the dark cellar room in the oldest part of the Manor. Amelia has worn a corset, hiding tools where the steel ribs are. Ramses and the butler Gargery appear. They use sledgehammers to smash the barred window opening from the outside, plus an explosive, which make an escape hole. Ramses and Gargery already rescued Minton, who was in a carriage with the villainous Wilson. Wilson was made immobile and later delivered to the police.

Safely out, Amelia describes all the connections among the museum staff and the aristocrats. She tells Cuff to exhume the night watchman's body, as it will reveal he died by an overdose of opium. He and Oldacre wanted more of the money taken by Wilson to keep the secrets of the aristocrats, leading to their murders. Mr Eustace Wilson is an Egyptologist working for Mr Budge of the museum, the link who allowed the aristocrats inside the museum after hours. He connected Lord Liverpool with Ayesha's opium den. Wilson pursued Minton, but she did not want him. Thus he abducted her to be in the aborted ceremony. He killed Gore, Oldacre, and Ayesha.

James and Elizabeth Peabody not only saved money by sending their children to the Emersons; they were also making the first steps in a plan to have the Emersons name Percy as their heir when the "frail" Ramses died. The mother was at home, not away in Germany for medical care, all the time. Amelia escorts Percy and Violet home to Birmingham and apologizes to Ramses.

== Reviews ==
Kirkus Reviews did not find the shift of setting from digs in Egypt to the British Museum in London, England, an asset to this novel. It "lacks the exoticism that lends credibility to a bizarre plot", and parents Amelia and Emerson are getting to be a bit boring, while their son "Ramses is a real treasure" of a character.

Publishers Weekly finds "This is one of grandmaster Peters/Michaels best." The review noted "unexpectedly tender moments between mother and child" yet found that the strongest aspects of the novel are found in the married "couple evenly matched as hot-blooded lovers and professional partners."

== See also ==
- List of characters in the Amelia Peabody series
