= He Shall Thunder in the Sky =

Book by Elizabeth Peters

- First edition cover
- Author: Elizabeth Peters
- Language: English
- Series: Amelia Peabody series mysteries
- Genre: Historical mystery
- Publisher: William Morrow
- Publication date: 2000
- Publication place: United States
- Media type: Print (hardback & paperback)
- Pages: 400
- ISBN: 0-380-97659-5
- OCLC: 43540556
- Dewey Decimal: 813/.54 21
- LC Class: PS3563.E747 H38 2000
- Preceded by: The Painted Queen
- Followed by: Lord of the Silent

He Shall Thunder in the Sky (also published as Thunder in the Sky) is the 12th in a series of historical mystery novels by Elizabeth Peters, first published in 2000, and featuring fictional archaeologist and sleuth Amelia Peabody. The story is set in the 1914–1915 dig season in Egypt.

== Plot ==
The novel opens with a Prologue, relating a boy of 14 coming home in a carriage in the snow. The carriage passes a woman and her son and continues to the house, where his widowed mother awaits. She tells him the woman was his late father's mistress, the boy, their son. His mother refuses to help them, and orders her son locked in his room so that he cannot help them.

The scene shifts to autumn 1914, after the outbreak of war, when women give out white feathers for cowardice to any young man not in uniform, like Ramses. Emerson's annual archaeology trip is not stopped by the war, though the Suez Canal, quite close to the dig site, is an immediate focus of the conflict; Britain formalized its protectorate of Egypt to strengthen its position to keep control of the canal. Ramses is working on the dig with his parents. Foster sister Nefret Forth returns from studying medicine in Switzerland, fully qualified as a physician and fully recovered from her brief and mistaken marriage. David Todros, grandson to the late Abdullah, is married to Lia, and he is a fully qualified artist and Egyptologist. The three young adults are close.

David was sent away to India, having expressed interest in Egyptian nationalism. Emerson and Amelia hope to get him back with them. Lia is in England, pregnant with their first child.

Emerson accepts a role as adviser on Egyptian affairs with the army, continuing the dig close to Cairo, in Giza. Their house is on the west bank of the Nile.

Amelia reflects on the abrupt change in their life when little Sennia and her mother were brought to their house two years earlier, with a procurer hoping to embarrass Ramses with the child, who has the eyes of a Peabody. Cousin Percy Peabody is the father, and arranged the scene. The Emersons took her in. She remains in England, at 5 years old too young for the dig. Things are almost back to normal between Nefret, who at first distrusted Ramses regarding Sennia.

Percy Peabody is now a captain with the British Egyptian army. Ramses and Percy share a mutual hatred for each other. Years earlier, Percy had been held for ransom in Palestine. Ramses, in his Arab garb, had rescued Percy without being recognized. Later Percy learned it had been Ramses, which caused more hatred, no gratitude.

Thomas Russell of the Cairo police tells Emerson how much he wants Wardani, leader of the Egyptian nationalists, to hold his followers at bay, turn himself in, to delay civil disturbance in Cairo while control of the Suez Canal was still threatened. He asks them, Emerson, Amelia and Nefret, to assist. They call Wardani out, tell him to escape, while Emerson misdirects the police officers. They soon meet Ramses, who had turned Russell down.

As the Emersons witness Wardani, Ramses has already taken over that role; the real Wardani was taken, sent to India in exchange for David, who can appear as Ramses when needed. Amelia feels foolish that she had not recognized her son in disguise. He helps the war effort in that way. Nefret is kept unaware of this work by Ramses.

Called away from the dig to rescue a girl stuck climbing a tall pyramid, Ramses and Emerson meet Melinda "Molly" Hamilton and her governess. She is an orphan, under the charge of her uncle Hamilton posted to Cairo.

Ramses realizes one of the loyal nationalists under him as Wardani is trying to kill him and is a spy for the German-Turk alliance. Amelia tells this to Russell, wanting his unit to seize the spy. The plan for getting Farouk out on the street for police capture fails, and Emerson agrees to a deal with a delay of two days. Three days later, Russell tells Emerson and Ramses that Farouk's body was found; he was murdered by the Turks. They never learn the name of Farouk's contact.

Emerson and Ramses trek east toward a relic in the desert, first reporting to the British military post where Hamilton is stationed. At the relic, Emerson's horse is shot. After they take cover, their attacker approaches, dressed in British uniform, speaking almost colloquial English. Emerson talks with him then jumps on him. Ramses disarms him, asks his name. Seeing he is trapped, the young German soldier commits suicide.

The same afternoon, Amelia visits the French Count de Sevigny, who she knows is Sethos in disguise. She believes him a spy for the enemy. He traps her as he packs to leave Cairo, discarding that persona. Nefret finds her at the Count's place; they are trapped together until Nefret pries the shades open so they can call out for help. Thomas Russell is among those who release them. She asks about her husband and son, who have not yet returned. The next morning, Emerson returns, followed by Ramses.

Ramses reads papers left out at Percy's place. Percy is a spy for the enemy and the man who tortured Farouk to death, cruel and vicious. Percy cannot accept the failure of his plans—there will be no street riot in Cairo—and begins beating Ramses. Far away, Nefret senses the peril facing Ramses, and persuades the Emersons it is real. David appears at their house with a bullet wound, tells them where to find Ramses after Nefret stabilizes him. Amelia and Nefret ride to Ramses.

Amelia recognizes Sethos, whose other disguise was Hamilton, a Scottish army man. He has pulled Percy out. But Percy returns, ready to kill them all. Sethos shoots him and Nefret sticks a knife in his back, but Percy shoots Sethos before dying. Then Emerson, Russell and men in uniform appear. Ramses tells them where the enemy attack will be. Sethos, agent for the British, is dying from gunshot; in his dying words he says Ramses is his nephew, revealing himself to be that boy in the snow, described in the prologue, half brother to Radcliffe Emerson. They try to make up, shake hands, and Sethos is carried away to an ambulance.

At home, the Emersons take in all the changes, and the military success of holding on to the Suez Canal. Ramses and Nefret marry, and a few days later, the four Emersons and David sail for England. They want to be there when Lia has her baby.

== Explanation of the novel's title ==
The title comes from a translation of "The Contendings of Horus and Set" from a papyrus in the Chester Beatty Library:

"Then Re-Harakte said: Let Set be given unto me, to dwell with me and be my son. He shall thunder in the sky and be feared."

== References to historical events or persons ==
The novel's climax coincides with the First Suez Offensive, the attack launched by the Ottoman Empire on the Suez Canal in January 1915.

== Reviews ==
Marilyn Stasio writing in The New York Times remarked that this novel is an energetic adventure, as Amelia gets to dig in a pyramid in Giza, her long time dream. The Great War has begun, which adds "a surprising jolt of realism" to the plot, as Giza is not far from the Suez Canal. Amelia and Emerson "are soon prowling the mean streets of Cairo in odd disguises, searching out spies and foreign agents."

Publishers Weekly said of the author that "Peters still writes a deeply satisfying story that combines elements of espionage, mystery and romance." They were impressed by this novel, still about archaeology in Egypt, with the start of The Great War not stopping Amelia and Emerson and family from their dig. The British are determined to hold the Suez Canal, as the Turks, allied with Germany, want to seize it. "The latest superb installment in this renowned series is one of Peters's best", with the subplots deftly interwoven.

== Awards ==
The novel was nominated for an Agatha Award in the "Best Novel" category in 2000 and for the 2001 Anthony Award in the same category.

== See also ==
- List of characters in the Amelia Peabody series
