= The Hippopotamus Pool =

Novel by Elizabeth Peters (aka Barbara Mertz)

- First edition cover
- Author: Elizabeth Peters
- Language: English
- Series: Amelia Peabody series mysteries
- Genre: Historical mystery
- Publisher: Warner Books
- Publication date: 1996
- Publication place: United States
- Media type: Print (hardback & paperback)
- Pages: xvi, 384
- ISBN: 0-446-51833-6
- OCLC: 32923807
- Dewey Decimal: 813/.54 20
- LC Class: PS3563.E747 H54 1996
- Preceded by: The Snake, the Crocodile, and the Dog
- Followed by: Seeing a Large Cat

The Hippopotamus Pool is the eighth in a series of historical mystery novels, written by Elizabeth Peters and first published in 1996. It features fictional sleuth and archaeologist Amelia Peabody. The story is set in the 1899–1900 archaeological dig season. Although one review found the novel "heavy handed" in its style, while recognizing the many fans of this series, other reviewers enjoyed the wit, the "melodramatic 19th-century writing style" and the dandy "romantic nonsense".

== Explanation of the novel's title ==
The title of the book comes from an ancient Egyptian tale about warring princes Apophis (Note: Probably Sekenenra Tao II, known as Tao II the Brave, son of Tetisheri.) and Sekenenre, (Note: Probably Aawoserra Apopi of the Hyksos.) wherein Apophis sends Sekenenre a message: "The roaring of the hippopotami in your pools prevents me from sleeping! Hunt them and kill them, that I may rest." There are also several references to the goddess Taueret, who is represented as a hippo.

== Plot summary ==
Amelia and Emerson are in Cairo to greet the 20th century, when a mysterious man presents them with a gold ring from an unknown tomb bearing the cartouche of Queen Tetisheri, then dies of poison. Emerson is attacked in this encounter.

Earlier in the year, Walter and Evelyn Emerson lost their youngest child, depressing Evelyn. Radcliffe, Walter's brother, asks them to join them in Egypt for the dig. Walter and Evelyn agree to return to Egypt, leaving their young children at home. Radcliffe and Amelia's teenaged children, son Ramses and daughter Nefret, join the dig as well.

Radcliffe has planned a larger scale dig than in prior years and surprises his wife with a Dahabeah, a house boat to base their families, instead of tents. He chooses a site where he hopes to find the tomb of Queen Tetisheri. The stranger's body is found floating in the Nile. A retired yet vicious seller of Egyptian antiques meets them on the dahabeah. Emerson and Amelia surmise there are two groups battling to take over the thieving ring once led by Sethos. Some of these competing thieves may assist the Emerson dig, and others may try to kill them, as evidenced on New Year's Eve.

Stopping at a shop that makes replicas or forgeries of ancient objects, they meet young David Todros, a grandson of Abdullah. Talented and rebellious, he is soon part of the Emerson entourage, blood brothers with Ramses. Work proceeds at the dig, which is a new tomb, attracting interest despite efforts to keep progress quiet.

Sir Edward Washington is the dig's photographer. Evelyn is an artist, who draws what is found at the site. Miss Gertrude Marmaduke, hired as a tutor, proves to be a theosophist with interest in the ancient Egyptian goddess Isis, and to have stolen the gold ring brought by the stranger.

Amelia and Evelyn sort out the threats into the Hippopotami, as the huge and vicious man Ricetti is a known threat, and the Jackals. Ramses slips out at night to find Ricetti, and is abducted by his gang, in exchange for all the valuables in the tomb. Nefret realizes he and David are gone and a search begins. Nefret is lured away by Miss Marmaduke to be part of a theosophist rite.

David returns to the boat, leading the adults where Ramses is kept, while Emerson seeks Nefret. They rescue the drugged Ramses, tossing him to Daoud to carry him to safety. A serious struggle ends with the gentle Evelyn killing one abductor and the leader Ricetti walking away. Emerson arrives after that struggle, having sought in vain for Nefret. David is reconciled with his grandfather Abdullah, having proved his loyalty to the Emerson family. They notify police to take Ricetti as he tries to board ship in Cairo, and the police nab him.

In the morning, Nefret is back on the boat. When she understood why she had been taken, she hit Miss Marmaduke on the head and escaped to the boat, unharmed.

Amelia visits Bertha, a woman who dressed as a widow in the Luxor hotel. She is one of the Jackals. Bertha directed the abduction of Nefret via the pliable Miss Marmaduke, saying there will be a religious rite. Bertha wants what is in the tomb and hates Amelia. Bertha directs her strong female companion Matilda to strangle Amelia, so Amelia could not fight back as Bertha knifed her. When Amelia passes out, Bertha and colleagues slip away. Sir Edward is present when Amelia awakens. He had followed her. Sir Edward then says he will leave the next day, for family reasons.

After two months of clearing the chamber sufficiently to reach the sarcophagus, Emerson opens it before an audience, to find it completely empty. Emerson is not bothered. The artwork and stories uncovered are worth the work. The queen was buried elsewhere and reburied, in a complicated series of events.

They sail home, taking David with them.

== Reviews ==
Kirkus Reviews found this novel to be written in a “heavy-handed” fashion, too much repetition, while recognizing there are many fans of the author’s style and the character of Amelia Peabody.

Publishers Weekly found the story unique with the wit and the writing style, and said that "The melodramatic 19th-century writing style studded with Amelia's sly wit makes this series unique to the subgenre of historical mysteries."

Marilyn Stasio, writing in The New York Times, called this a "dandy' distraction with the "frisky heroine" Amelia Peabody. Quoting from the text, Stasio wrote ""Oh, good Gad!" Emerson explodes. "Are we to have another of these melodramatic distractions?" Indeed we are—and it's a dandy one too. Such romantic nonsense. Such fun."

== See also ==
- List of characters in the Amelia Peabody series
