= Crocodile on the Sandbank =

1975 novel by Elizabeth Peters (Barbara Mertz)

- First edition cover for Crocodile on the Sandbank
- Author: Elizabeth Peters
- Language: English
- Series: Amelia Peabody series mysteries
- Genre: Historical mystery
- Publisher: Dodd, Mead
- Publication date: 1975
- Publication place: United States
- Media type: Print (hardback & paperback)
- Pages: x, 273
- ISBN: 0-396-07080-9
- OCLC: 1130123
- Dewey Decimal: 813/.5/4
- LC Class: PZ4.M577 Cp PS3563.E747
- Followed by: The Curse of the Pharaohs

Crocodile on the Sandbank is a historical mystery novel by Elizabeth Peters, first published in 1975. It is the first in the Amelia Peabody series of novels and takes place in 1884–1885.

== Plot summary ==
Amelia Peabody is the youngest of six and the only daughter. She is a determined, outspoken and unorthodox English woman. She expects that she will never marry, as she believes she is unattractive and she will neither submit to a man nor rule one. She ran her father's household, dealt with tradespeople, and enjoyed his interests of history and archaeology, and the British Museum. Her much older brothers lived on their own. Her father named her as his sole heir, leaving her half a million pounds upon his death, when she is 32 years old. This inheritance allows Amelia to travel abroad in 1884 to follow her enthusiasm for the places she had studied, and for antiquities.

Amelia Peabody meets the destitute Evelyn Forbes in Rome. Her titled and very British grandfather has cast her off. Evelyn had run off with her Italian art teacher Alberto, who did not marry her and then abandoned her.

Amelia employs Evelyn as a companion to Egypt, having bought new clothes for both in Rome. They become fast friends. In Cairo they stay at Shepheard's Hotel. Visiting the museum, they encounter the Emerson brothers, Radcliffe and Walter, archaeologist and philologist respectively. Amelia falls in love with the pyramids at Giza.

Amelia and Evelyn decide to travel up the River Nile in a dahabeah, stopping at various sites along the way. When they reach Amarna, they discover the Emersons excavating the city which for a while was the capital of Egypt under the pharaoh Akhenaten.

Radcliffe Emerson is loud, often rude, scornful of women, determined, and single-minded about his chosen career. He has a fever; she tends him with Walter's aid. Once Emerson is somewhat better, she works to preserve tomb artwork. Amelia and Emerson begin to respect one another. Evelyn is attracted to Walter, but is convinced her soiled reputation bars marriage.

Evelyn's cousin Lucas shows up at the site with a story about her grandfather's death, his new title, and a proposal of marriage to Evelyn, which she declines. There is the problem of a person disguised as a mummy walking at night where they sleep. The group pulls together to entrap the person. The workers have stopped work at the dig, being afraid of this intruder. Lucas shoots Walter in the shoulder, letting the intruder get away. There are more missed chances before Emerson and Amelia figure out what is happening and interfere effectively.

Rejected suitors Alberto, as the walking mummy, and Lucas Luigi, with his guns and doctored wine, teamed up to get Evelyn and her grandfather's final will, ready to leave her dead in their greed. Her grandfather sent that will in the trunks of her clothing, which have not yet reached Evelyn. Grandfather left his money and property to her; his title goes to Lucas. The two are brought to Cairo.

Two years later, Amelia and Emerson are married and expecting their first child, as the Amarna dig season nears its end. Evelyn and Walter are also married, awaiting the birth of their second child at her estate, Ellesemere Castle, in Shropshire.

== Reviews ==
The tone of the novel is humorous to the point of parody and pokes fun at many of the period's mores and stereotypes, as well as the sensationalist novels popular in the period of the setting of the novel.

Kirkus Reviews said that Peters used the "period setting" to advantage in this novel. The heroine is intrepid, yet "Here and there you might almost suspect that Miss Peters is twitting the category—in any case it's still loweroglyphics for those who barely read—anything better." Loweroglyphics is a pun on hieroglyphics, the writing system of ancient Egypt, which is the period studied by these 19th century Egyptologists.

A review in the Sydney Morning Herald noted the style of the writing as a commentary on the archaeology, disturbing burial sites: the collision course of Amelia and archeologist Emerson "provided laughs as well as the threat of death and danger that seems to partner disturbing the Pharaohs in their ancient resting places."

== Background ==
Elizabeth Peters' background in Egyptology lends authenticity to the settings and the history presented in the novel. The method of travel by boat ("dahabeeyah") down the Nile that was popular in the late 1800s, as well as the customs of the various cultures, are true to the era.

== Title ==
The title of the book comes from an ancient Egyptian text:

The love of my beloved is on yonder side
A width of water is between us
And a crocodile waiteth on the sandbank.

(Ancient Egyptian love poem, from the front matter of the paperback edition.)
