= Marilyn Stasio =

New York City author, writer and literary critic

Marilyn Stasio is a New York City author, writer and literary critic. She has been the "Crime Columnist" for The New York Times Book Review since about 1988, having written over 650 reviews as of January 2009. She says she reads "a few" crime books a year professionally (about 150) and many more for pleasure. She also writes for Variety, New York Post, New York magazine and others. She has served as a dramaturg at the Eugene O'Neill Theater Center.

In 1990 she interviewed British writer Ruth Rendell.

In December 2018 Mystery Writers of America awarded Stasio the 2019 Raven Award for "outstanding achievement in the mystery field outside the realm of creative writing."

== Published works ==
- Showtune: A Memoir (1996; with Jerry Herman)
- Sweet Revenge: 10 Plays of Bloody Murder (1992; with Marvin Kaye)
- Broadway's Beautiful Losers: The Strange History of Five Neglected Plays (1972)
