= Dahabeah =

Type of boat used on the River Nile

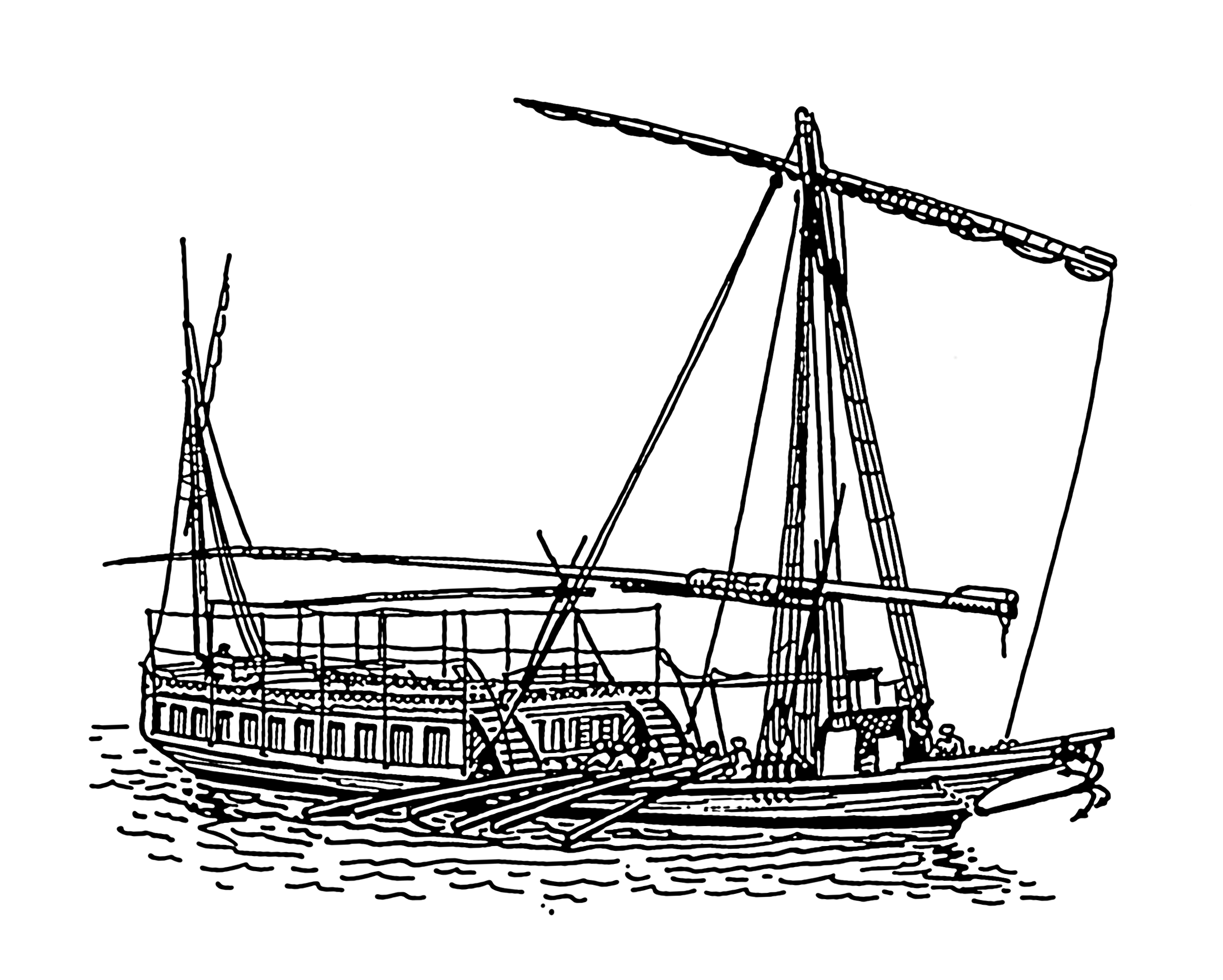
Line drawing of a dahabeah

A dahabeah, also spelled dahabeeyah, dahabeyah, dahabiah, dahabiya, dahabiyah and dhahabiyya, as well as dahabiyeh and dahabieh (Arabic ذهبية /ðahabīya/), is a passenger boat used on the river Nile in Egypt. The term is normally used to describe a shallow-bottomed, barge-like vessel with two or more sails. The vessels have been around in one form or another for thousands of years, with similar craft being depicted on the walls of the tombs of Egyptian Pharaohs. Indeed, the name derives from the Arabic word for "gold", owing to similar, gilded state barges used by the Muslim rulers of Egypt in the Middle Ages.

== History ==
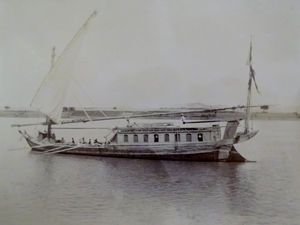
Dahabeah on the Nile, 1891

Until the 1870s the dahabiya was the standard for tourists to travel up and down the river Nile. According to Donald Reid, in 1858 "a forty-day round trip from Cairo to Luxor cost about £110; a fifty-day trip to Aswan and back, about £150." However, Thomas Cook Ltd introduced the steam boat on the river and brought with them the organisational know how to turn a three-month voyage into a 28-day sight-seeing tour. By 1900, as trains had started to compete with the steam boat, dahabiyas were reserved only for the most wealthy, leisured travelers.

This is also the time that saw great change in how dahabiyas were used and viewed. Sir John Gardner Wilkinson's 1847 book "Hand-book for travelers in Egypt" goes into great detail on how to hire a dahabiya. A traveler wishing to travel the Nile would not only have to hire the boat for the duration but provision it, de-bug and de-rat it, oversee the boatmen and even have it re-painted. However, by 1897 tour companies had made the journey much more civil. Thomas Cook promised, "Dragomans and other necessary servants and food supplies are carefully selected and provided."

== Modern era ==
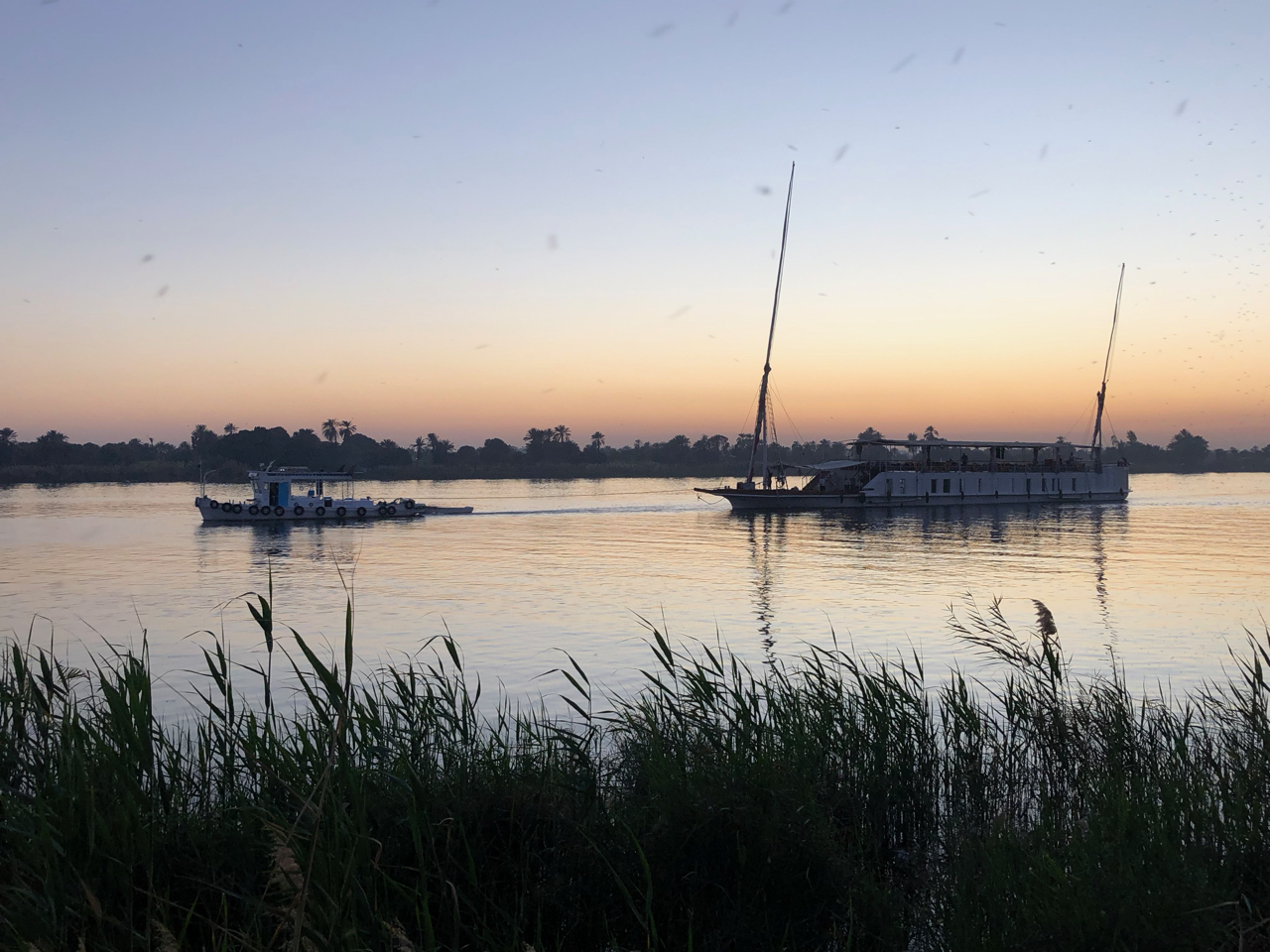
Modern Nile dahabiya under tow by a tugboat, 2020

Modern dahabiyas still lack a motor-driven propeller. They are towed by diesel-powered tugboats, and have an onboard diesel-powered generator to provide electricity.

Dahabeya is also the name of a specific vessel.

== Etymology ==
ذهبية /ðahabīya/ is the feminine of ذهبي /ðahabī/ "golden", from ذهب /ðahab/ "gold". In Arabic the feminine suffix -a can indicate the singulative of inanimates, changing the meaning from "golden" to "a single golden thing". Thus the meaning of ذهبية is something like "a golden one."

== Gallery ==
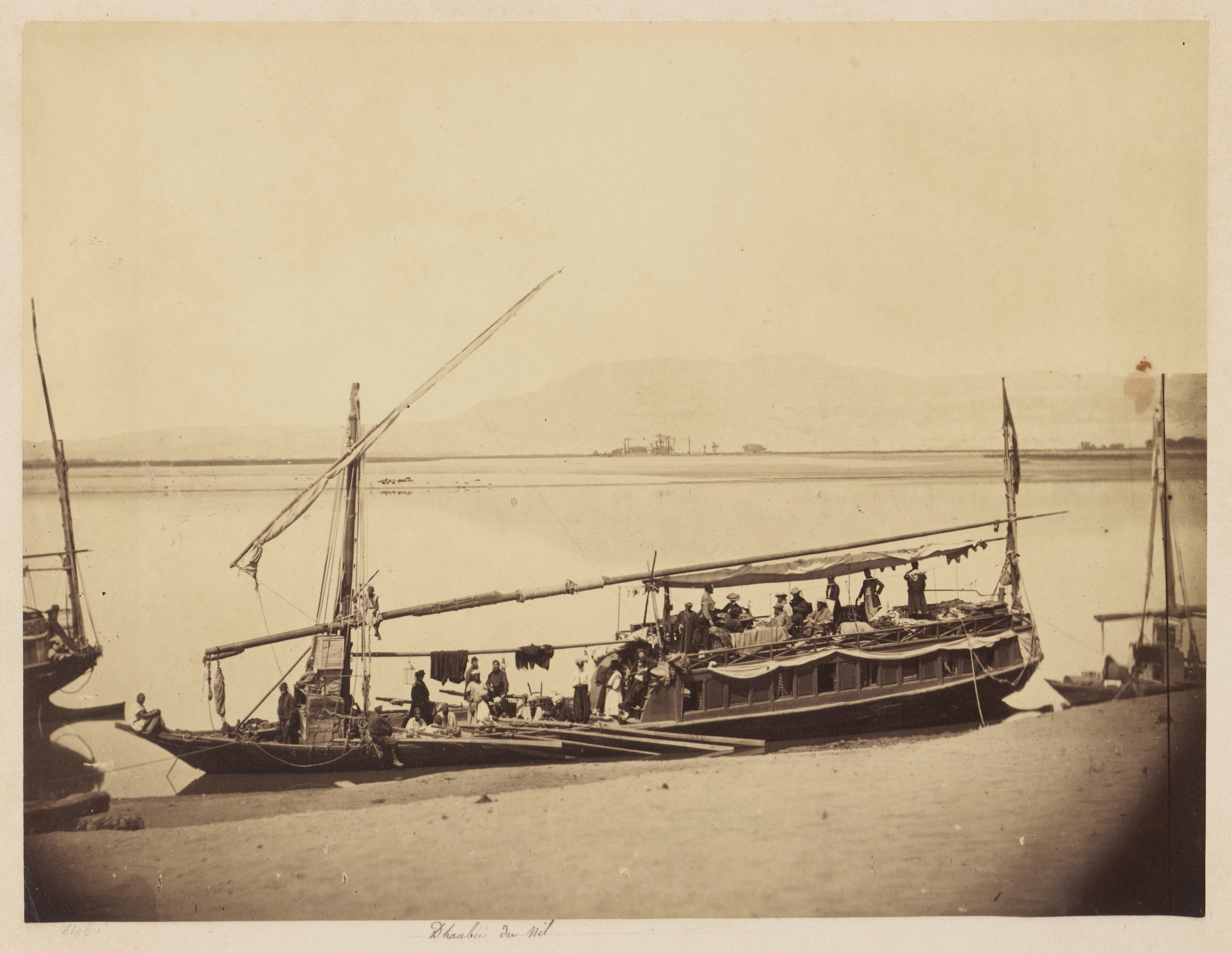
Dahabeah (1862)

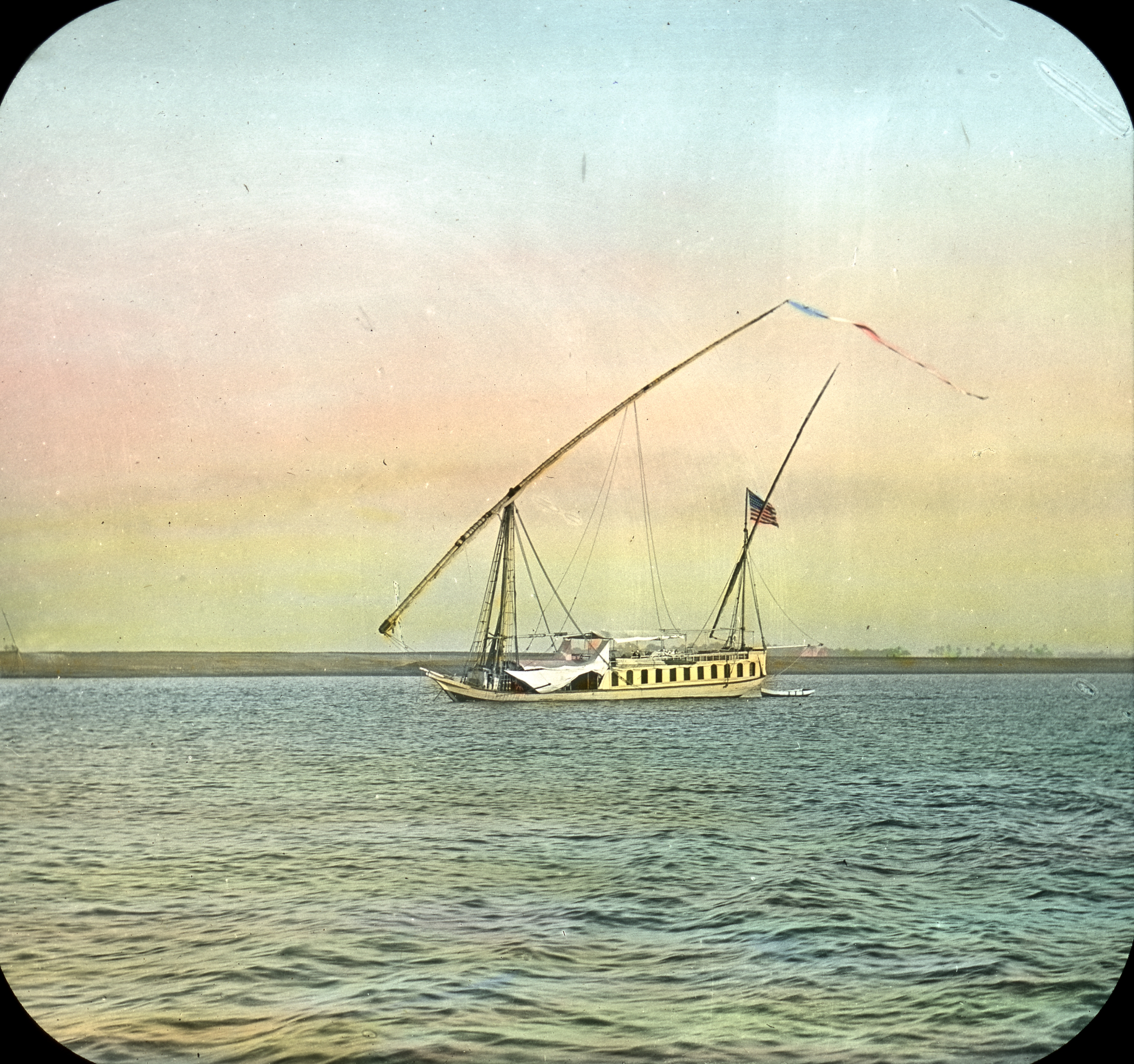
Dhahabiyeh of American tourists, Luxor, n.d., Brooklyn Museum Archives

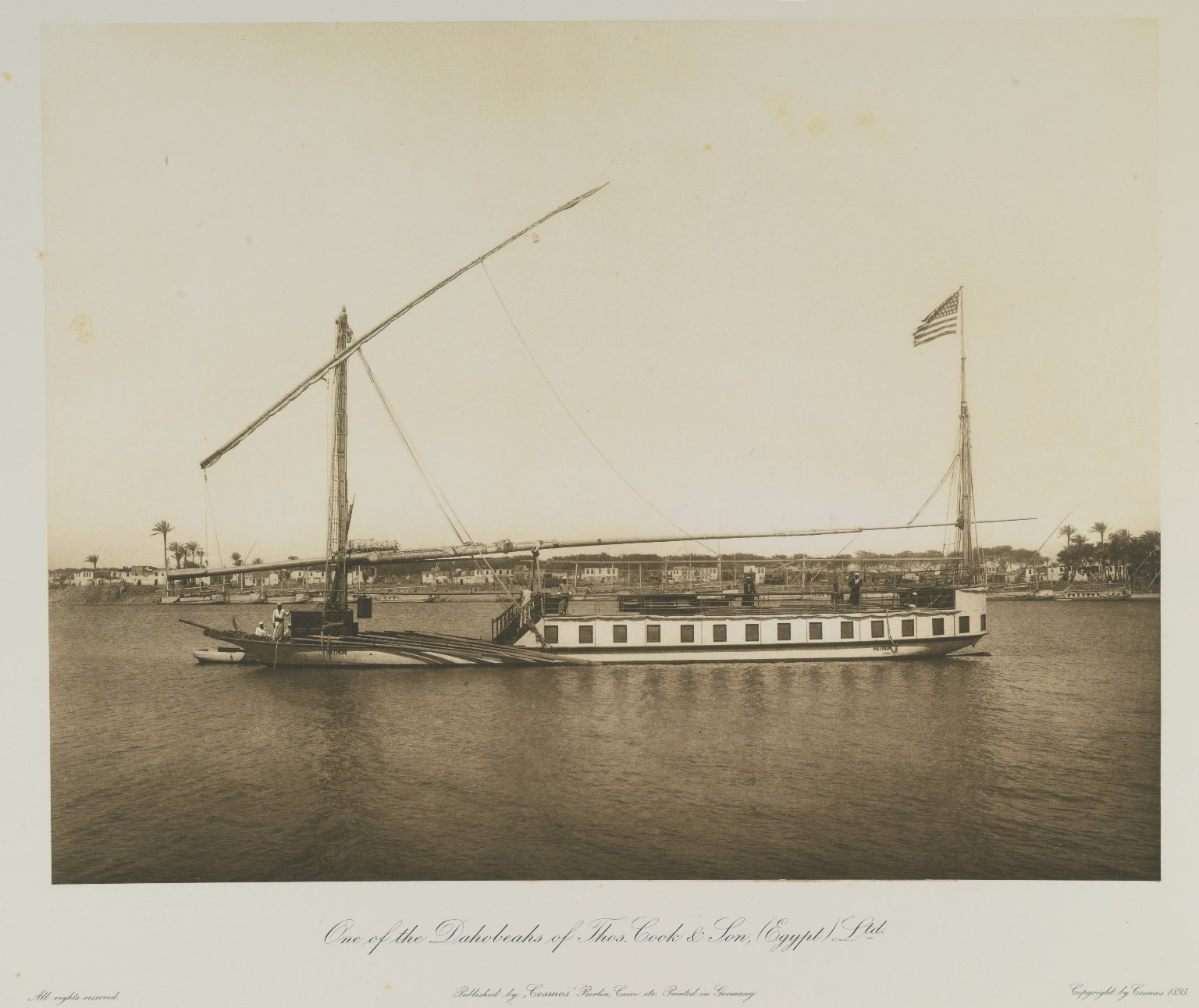
"One of the dahabeahs of Thos. Cook & Son, (Egypt) Ltd." (1893)

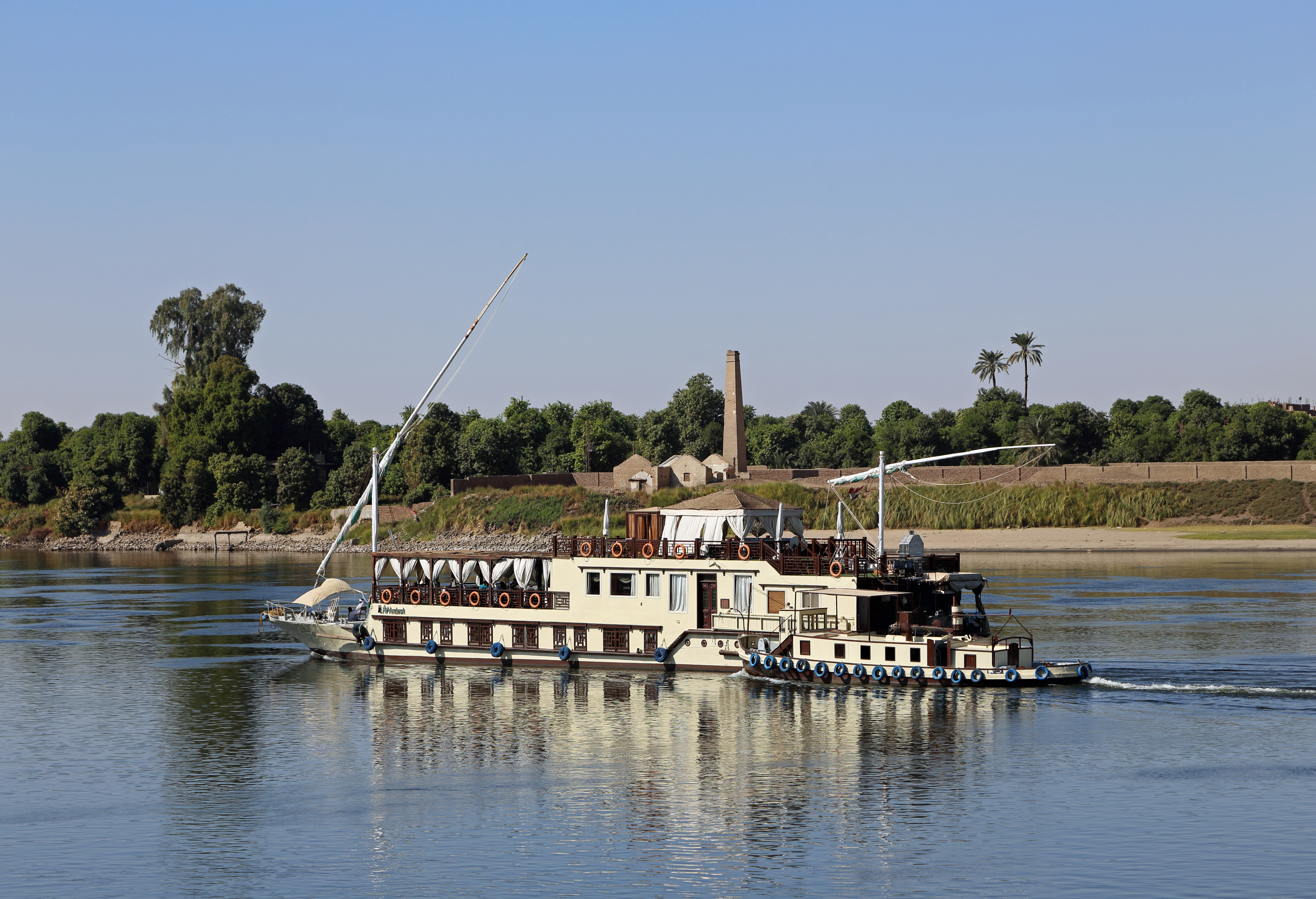
Modern dahabeah on the Nile, being pushed by a tugboat (2018)
