= Amelia Peabody =

Protagonist of the Amelia Peabody novel series

Amelia Peabody Emerson is the protagonist of the Amelia Peabody series, a series of historical mystery novels written by author Elizabeth Peters (a pseudonym of Egyptologist Barbara Mertz, 1927–2013). Peabody is married to Egyptologist Radcliffe Emerson and has one biological child, Walter "Ramses" Peabody Emerson.

== Biographical sketch ==
Amelia Peabody is first introduced in the novel Crocodile on the Sandbank, set in 1884. She is the spinster daughter of a reclusive scholar who left her to deal with practical issues such as shopping and administering the household while he spent time in his office. He nurtured her scholarly interest, while the rest of her immediate family dismissed them both. Following his death, Peabody's devotion to her father was rewarded with her being named sole beneficiary of his substantial fortune of over £500,000 (over £30 million in 2006 values). Partly in order to escape the attention of numerous fortune-hunting suitors and relatives begging for money, she embarks on a tour of classical sites, beginning in Italy and moving on to Egypt with the eventual aim of visiting Palestine. While in Rome, she rescues a young woman in trouble, Evelyn Barton Forbes, whom she hires to be her companion.

In Egypt, the pair encounters the Emerson brothers, Radcliffe, an archaeologist, and Walter, a philologist. Over the course of the novel, Walter pursues Evelyn resulting in their engagement by the book's end—while less overt, the relationship between Amelia and Radcliffe develops toward their own marriage. In keeping with the egalitarian nature of their relationship, the two propose to each other, with Amelia teasing that she agreed because marriage to Emerson was the only way that she could engage in Egyptology without causing a scandal.

The pair refer to each other by their respective surnames: Emerson refers to Amelia as "Peabody," using her first name only when he is annoyed with her. In turn, Peabody refers to Radcliffe Emerson almost exclusively by his surname, "Emerson", although some other family members call him Radcliffe. It is eventually revealed that he dislikes his first name as it was his estranged mother's maiden name.

Peabody's first (and only) child, Walter, was born in 1887. Walter quickly became known as "Ramses", after Emerson remarked that he was "swarthy as an Egyptian and arrogant as a pharaoh."

The majority of the series is written in Amelia's voice, with Ramses providing a supplemental parallel narrative in many of the later books, identified as "Manuscript H."

== Personality ==
Amelia Peabody is presented as a head-strong, confident woman who capably ran her father's household and bullied local merchants in the course of bargaining. It is quickly established that she has no patience with "helpless" women who play on their femininity to manipulate others into doing their will; i.e., "swooning, weak-minded females", according to Emerson. When home in England, she is a strong supporter of and is occasionally involved in the Suffragette Movement. She is a proponent of rational dress, and often refuses to wear a corset. (See Deeds of the Disturber for a notable exception.)

With the introduction of the Manuscript H fragments in Seeing a Large Cat the reader is introduced to her family's loving perceptions of her, which includes recognition of her extraordinary stubbornness, and utter conviction that she is right, even when she contradicts herself in the assertion. This is dealt with in good humor and affection by her family. Amelia is also addicted to romance (although she denies it vehemently), much more sentimental than she admits to and, despite her disdain for weak-willed women who employ impractical fashion, vain enough to go to great lengths to color her graying hair and hide her efforts particularly from Emerson.

At the core of her personality is her deep love for her husband (and his for her), as well as the mutual respect they share for one another.. A favourite expression of hers is "Another shirt ruined..." because Emerson regularly bursts out of his shirt, either in the course of an adventure or in the throes of passion. The relationship between Amelia and Emerson may best be described as 'Brontean'; the story of the handsome but rough-mannered hero tamed by the right woman plays out according to classic Romantic formula. She extends this view to her family and acquaintances, often imagining relationships that are not there, while totally missing those that are, until she is shocked by the revelation of who has proposed to whom.

Amelia's dress and mannerisms are frequently the cause of comment and wonder from outsiders. In earlier books in the series it is established that her favorite ruins to explore are pyramids. She usually carries one of her collection of parasols, which she uses as discreet, or not so discreet, weapons (including a sword-parasol). Her other usual accessory is her belt, later partially replaced with a vest with many pockets. It contains: "Pistol and knife, canteen, bottle of brandy, candle and matches in a waterproof box, notebook and pencil, needle and thread, compass, scissors, first-aid kit and a coil of stout cord (useful for tying up captured enemies)." (He Shall Thunder in the Sky, Chapter 2)

Though she carries a small pistol, she is a terrible shot and rarely makes an effort to improve her skill, laughing off Emerson's suggestions that she could do more harm than good. Unfortunately, on more than one occasion she has come close to harming a member of the family while wielding the pistol, rarely blaming herself for the near miss (e.g. her shooting at Ramses and an assailant in The Ape Who Guards the Balance). Because her family is frequently involved in stopping criminal activity, and she has successfully deduced facts of numerous cases, she views herself as an expert in such matters, to the point of denigrating truly competent law enforcement officers. And because some of the plots they have uncovered were in fact complex, she tends to make all solutions, even those not involving crime, complex and even outlandish while missing the obvious. Joined with her stubbornness, this tendency to over-analyze a problem frequently leads to her holding an incorrect belief far longer than is safe for her or her family.

Another feature of the novels is the egalitarian theme, with Amelia and her family being very close to the family of their original Egyptian reis (foreman) Abdullah, to the extent that there is a marriage between Amelia's English niece and Abdullah's Coptic Christian grandson. Reflecting contemporary attitudes, this pairing is initially met with resistance from all - including Amelia, much to her own surprise — because of David's origins and nationality. The marriage can only proceed after she has a change of heart and is able to convince others that the young couple's affection should take precedence over notions of race. Following Abdullah's death, Amelia begins to see him in dreams, where he gives her warnings and advice, further illustrating how close they were.

Amelia is a proponent of equality between the sexes, and brings up her adopted daughter, Nefret Emerson, accordingly. This does not prevent her from routinely criticizing Nefret or other young women for acting as rashly as she herself regularly does. Her name among the Egyptians is "Sitt Hakim", or Lady Doctor. This was given her when, soon after her initial arrival in Egypt, she showed such care for the Egyptians she encountered, particularly in treating a number of eye diseases—such as ophthalmia—that were common at the time. Her love for Egypt and its people is as deep and often reveals itself in her distaste for Europeans that view Egyptians with either condescension or disgust.

Perhaps her greatest personal conflict is her long-term love-hate relationship with Sethos. From the first encounter with him as the “Master Criminal”, she has seen him behind many of the plots they encounter; even when it is clear to everyone else that he is not involved. Yet she is strangely drawn to him and feels that there is something about him that fills her with emotions that are otherwise restricted to Emerson. She becomes convinced that she alone has brought about his reformation, even though it is a number of years after that “reformation” that Sethos is actually rehabilitated.

== Amelia's age ==
Amelia's age is initially given as 32 in Crocodile on the Sandbank, set in 1884. In a 1994 article, Elizabeth Peters discussed the obstacle this presented:

"If I had intended Crocodile to be the first in a series, I probably wouldn't have been as specific about dates. Not only did Amelia inform the reader of her age (curse her!), but historical events mentioned in the book tied it to a particular year. As the series continued, there was no way I could get around this, or fudge the date of Ramses' birth, or keep him and his parents from aging a year every twelve months."

According to this timeline, Amelia would be seventy years old in the eighteenth book, Tomb of the Golden Bird, set in 1922–23. In The Hippopotamus Pool, however, the Introduction contains what is supposed to be an excerpt from "The National Autobiographical Dictionary (45th edition)", in which Amelia herself states that she was her late twenties at the time of her first visit to Egypt. The statement is footnoted, and the footnote provides specific instructions not to question the discrepancy (pp. xii and xvi.).

In Seeing a Large Cat, Emerson's age at the time they married is given as 29, making him three years younger than his wife.

The latest chronological mention of Amelia is in the compendium Amelia Peabody's Egypt: A Compendium, which mentions her taking a souvenir from her visit to Egypt in 1939, as war is looming and she was uncertain that she would ever return. Her age is given as 87, which would be correct according to the original timeline.

== Pronunciation ==
In an interview with Diane Rehm, Peters discussed the correct pronunciation of "Peabody", which she had intended to be pronounced "PEA-b^{uh}-d^{ee}" (piːbʌdi) in the style of upper class English and New England society, not "pea-BOD-i" (piːbaːdiː). By contrast, in the audio versions of the books—including those recorded by voice actress Barbara Rosenblat, whom Peters has praised for her accurate pronunciation—Amelia's surname is pronounced "pea-BOD-i".

The difference in nationality between the Emersons and their creator is sometimes revealed through the use of American terms like "railroad", spelling differences, etc.

== See also ==
- Amelia Peabody series
- List of characters in the Amelia Peabody series
- Elly Griffiths Ruth Galloway series
