= Zerzura =

Mythical desert city in Egypt or Libya

Zerzura (Arabic: زرزورة) is a legendary city or oasis located in the Sahara Desert.

== Historical Sources ==
Despite the persistent nature of the myth of Zerzura, few primary historical sources make mention of it. The mid-13th century Villages of the Fayyum, a registrar of rural Egypt at the time compiled by Abū ‘Uthmān al-Nābulusī, contains the first mention of a settlement called Zerzura: "As for Tanabtawayh Canal, which was mentioned first, its villages that had been deserted in the southern area are Tanabtawayh; Tabā; Shallã; Itfih; Ihrit al-Mun-galaba; Haddada; Juzāza, or, as some say, Zujaja; Sanhüris; Burjtüt; Sudü; Sidrã; Badris; Sanhaba; Aqnã; Tanhamă; Kharãb Oãsim; Bani Bari, Tanhamat al-Sidr; Qaşr Qārün; Zarzura [boldness added for legibility]; al-Rayyãn. These villages were deserted so that there is no dweller or resident in them." Unlike the other sources below, Villages of the Fayyum is a secular text concerned with taxation, meaning that there was little incentive to invent or include mythical places. However, even by the 13th century a village called Zarzura was understood to be abandoned. The text later goes on to state what happened to many of the abandoned villages: "[Moreover], I have observed that the people of villages currently inhabited have begun sowing the lands of those villages that had been deserted for many years. So much so, that the land reclaimed at the time of writing this book is all that is possible to reclaim [...]."

In the lost Arabic manuscript Kitab al-Kanuz, Zerzura is described as follows, according to a French translation: "In the town of Warde, located behind El-qala in Essoury, you will see palm trees, vines, and springs. Enter the wadi and continue upstream; you will find another wadi that extends westward between two mountains. From this latter wadi, a path leads to the town of Farzourah [boldness added for legibility], whose gate you will find closed. It is a white town, like a dove, and on the gate is carved a bird. Take the key from the bird's beak with your hand, then open the town gate. Enter, and you will find much wealth, as well as the king and queen lying in the castle. Do not approach them, but take the treasures."

The first European reference to Zerzura is in an 1835 account by the English Egyptologist John Gardner Wilkinson, based on a report by an Arab who said he had found the oasis while searching for a lost camel. Placed five days west of the track connecting the oases of Farafra and Bahariya, the "Oasis called Wadee Zerzoora" abounded "in palms, with springs, and some ruins of uncertain date."Although tales of secret desert locales found by searchers for stray camels were common enough, Wilkinson's account was bolstered when later explorers found a number of previously unknown oases that had been named in his account along with Zerzura. But they did not find Zerzura itself."

More recently, European explorers made forays into the desert in search of Zerzura but never succeeded in finding it. Notable twentieth-century explorers Ralph Bagnold of Britain, and the Hungarian László (Ladislaus) Almásy led an expedition to search for Zerzura from 1929–1930 using Ford Model A trucks. In 1932 the Almásy–Patrick Clayton expedition reconnaissance flights discovered two valleys in the Gilf Kebir. In the following year, Almásy found the third of the "Zerzura" wadis, actually rain oases in the remote desert. On the other hand, Bagnold considered Zerzura as a legend that could never be solved by discovery.

The participants of the Zerzura hunt created the Zerzura Club in a bar in Wadi Halfa upon their return in 1930. Many of the club's members remained friends and several went on to serve as officers in the British Army during World War II. Many served in the Long Range Desert Patrol during the North African Campaign. Only Almásy served Rommel's Afrika Korps and assisted the Italians.

== The modern myth of the lost city of Zerzura ==
Various online sources on Zerzura relate a supposedly historicaly-founded story about the origin of the myth of Zerzura as a city lost in the Sahara desert. These blog articles show a notable level of shared detail and relate the story in much the same way, as follows: Allegedly, a document by a scribe of the Emir of Benghazi from 1481 contains the report of a camel herder named Hamid Keila, who appeared at Benghazi in a sorry state that year. He allegedly told the Emir that he had been the only survivor of a caravan, which had gotten lost in a sandstorm, and that he had been found by the tall, fair, and blue-eyed inhabitants of a hidden city called Zerzura. These men with straight swords took him into their city, which he found white and prosperous, and took good care of him, speaking a peculiar form of Arabic. The implication throughout the story is that these people are lost crusaders or their descendants. When asked by the Emir why Hamid Keila had returned to the city, then, Hamid allegedly evaded the question, which is why the Emir had him searched. On his body, the Emir found a precious ruby set in a gold ring. As punishment, the Emir had Hamid's hands cut off, and the ring made its way via King Idris of Libya into the hands of Muammar al-Gaddafi.

Despite the often repeated nature of this story, there is no primary evidence supporting it; there are no accounts of an Emir of Banghazi in the year 1481 nor of a camel herder named Hamid Keila, outside of the above-mentioned story. Instead, this story likely traces its origin back to a 1969 pop-culture mystery entertainment book called "More Strange Unsolved Mysteries" by Emile Schurmacher. In it, the author relates the story with much the same details, including the Emir of Benghazi (named here Mahmoud), Hamid Keila, the tall, blue-eyed men with straight swords (instead of scimitars), the white city, Hamid's escape, the Ruby, and its connection to King Idris. This story is highly likely to be a fabrication, however. For one, there is not evidence for an Emir Mahmoud at Benghazi in 1481, nor of his scribe or a ruby of crusader origin in King Idris' or Gaddafi's collections. Additionally, Schurmacher does not cite sources besides the anonymous scribe or once again anonymous archaeologists who allegedly investigated the jewel. Most importantly, "More Strange Unsolved Mysteries" is in no way a credible source, as its goal is to entertain the reader with phenomena allegedly impossible to explain via scientific means, among them the debunked Bermuda Triangle, bigfoot, ghost ships, and additional mystery stories with no sources besides Schurmacher's word.

== Books and articles about Zerzura (non-fiction) ==
- Unknown Sahara (Ismeretlen Szahara) by László Almásy (Budapest, 1934) describing his expeditions in search of Zerzura. German translation Unbekannte Sahara (Leipzig, 1939).
- Récentes Explorations dans le Désert Libyque by László Almásy (Cairo, 1936) – a publication summarizing the results of the successful search for Zerzura
  - German translation by Klaus Kurre in Mythos Zarzura. Belleville, Munich 2020, ISBN 978-3-936298-18-5
- In Search of Zerzura by Orde Wingate, in The Geographical Journal, Vol. 83, No. 4 (1934), pp. 281–308. Published by The Royal Geographical Society. DOI: 10.2307/1786487
- The Hunt for Zerzura: the lost oasis and the desert war (2002) about members of the Zerzura Club in World War II by Saul Kelly

== Zerzura in fiction ==
=== Novels ===
- The English Patient (1992) by Michael Ondaatje was loosely based on Almásy's life
- Pirates of the Caribbean: The Price of Freedom has a main storyline setting on Zerzura, as the story bases on slavery, from the viewpoint of Captain Jack Sparrow.
- The Eye of Ra, a gothic mystery novel by desert explorer Michael Asher, connects Zerzura to the Pharaoh Akhnaten, alien visitations, and UFO
- Biggles Flies South by Captain W. E. Johns (1938) is a fictional account of three British airmen who discover Zerzura.
- The Lost Oasis, a Doc Savage novel by Kenneth Robeson (Lester Dent), September 1933, takes place largely in Zerzura.
- The Last Camel Died at Noon (1991) and Guardian of the Horizon (2004), part of the Amelia Peabody series by Elizabeth Peters, both take place in a fictional Lost Oasis city partly inspired by the Zerzura legend. In Guardian of the Horizon, two of the characters agree that "the lost city of Zerzura is... little more than a legend."

=== Films about Zerzura ===
- Zerzura (Sahel Sounds, 2017) directed by Christopher Kirkley. Feature-length ethnofiction shot in the Sahara desert.
