= Devil May Care =

Devil May Care may refer to:

== Music ==
- Devil May Care, an album by Bob Dorough, 1956
- Devil May Care (album), by Teri Thornton, 1961
- Devil May Care, an album by Claire Martin, 1993
- "The Devil May Care (Mom & Dad Don't)", a song by the Brian Jonestown Massacre from Give It Back!, 1997
- Devil May Care (EP) or the title song, by Susperia, 2005
- The Devil May Care, an album by 67 Special, 2007
- Devil May Care, an EP by Iron Steel, 2008

== Other uses ==
- Devil-May-Care, a 1929 film musical starring Ramón Novarro
- Devil May Care (Peters novel), a 1977 novel by Elizabeth Peters
- Devil May Care (Faulks novel), a 2008 James Bond novel by Sebastian Faulks
- Devil May Care (horse) (2007–2011), an American Thoroughbred racehorse
- Devil May Care (TV series), a 2021 American adult animated comedy series

== See also ==
- Devil May Cry, a video game series
