= Dr. Bliss =

Dr. Bliss or Doctor Bliss may refer to:

- Doctor Willard Bliss (1825–1889), American physician, known for treating U.S. President James Garfield
- Dr. Clinton Bliss, American physician and candidate in the 2021 Seattle mayoral election

== Fictional characters ==
- Dr. Mindrum W. C. Bliss, fictional Egyptologist featured in the 1930 mystery novel The Scarab Murder Case by S. S. Van Dine
- Dr. Victoria Bliss, fictional art historian featured in The Vicky Bliss Mysteries by Barbara Mertz
- Dr. Bliss, fictional child psychologist featured in the Hey Arnold franchise
