= Mazghuna =

Site of Ancient Egyptian pyramids

Coordinates: 29°45′0″N 31°14′0″E

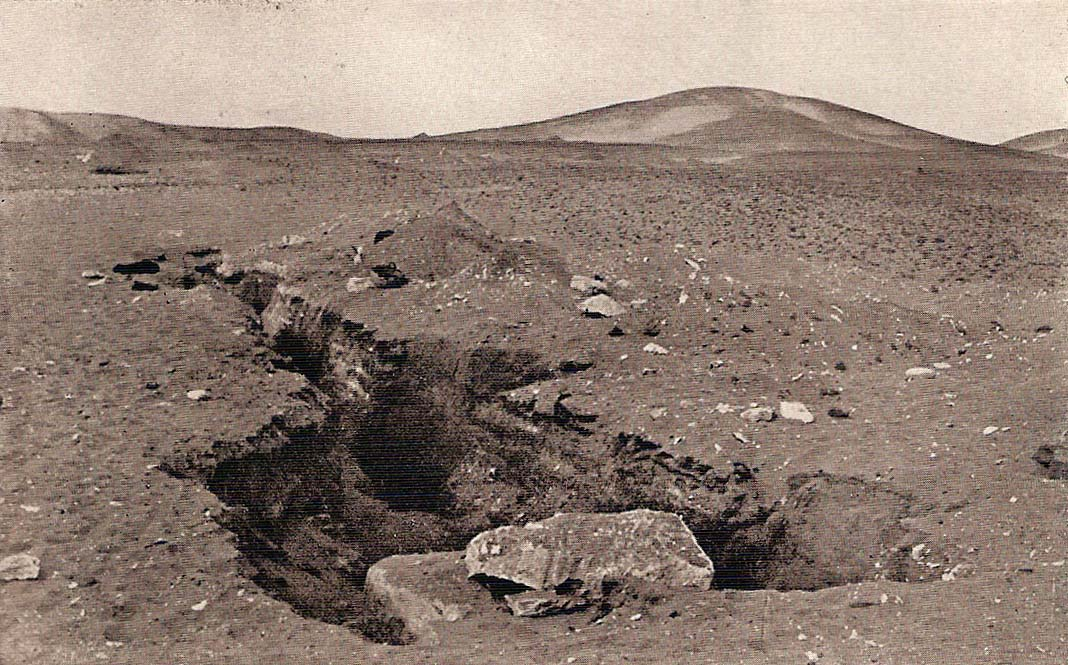
Ruins of the southern pyramid

Mazghuna (also known as Al Mazghunah or Al-Muzghumah), 5 kilometres (3.1 mi) to the south of Dahshur, is the site of several mudbrick pyramids dating from the 12th Dynasty. The area was explored by Ernest Mackay in 1910, and was excavated by Flinders Petrie in 1911. Amenemhat IV and Sobekneferu have been suggested as the owners of two unfinished pyramids at Mazghuna, but there is no conclusive evidence of this.

The Southern Mazghuna pyramid is about 4.8 kilometres (3 miles) from Sneferu's Bent pyramid. The base was 52.5 meters (172 ft) square but it was never finished. The outer burial chamber contains an inner monolithic burial vault made out of quartzite like the one for Amenemhat III at Hawara. There was a large granite plug ready to slide over the top however it was never used since no one was ever buried there.

The Northern Mazghuna pyramid was planned even larger than this one but the superstructure was never begun. There was a U-shaped passage leading to the burial chamber which contains another monolithic burial vault. There was scarcely 2 centimetres (0.79 in) clearance between the vault and the chamber. There was a 38-tonne (42-short-ton) quartzite slab waiting to be slid over the burial chamber.

== In fiction ==
The Amelia Peabody mystery The Mummy Case (by Elizabeth Peters) was set in Mazghuna.

== See also ==
- Northern Mazghuna pyramid
- Southern Mazghuna pyramid
- List of megalithic sites
