= Amelia Peabody's Egypt =

2003 non-fiction book edited by Elizabeth Peters and Kristen Whitbread

Amelia Peabody's Egypt : A Compendium
- First edition cover of Amelia Peabody's Egypt
- Author: Elizabeth Peters, Kristen Whitbread
- Language: English
- Series: Amelia Peabody
- Subject: Egypt
- Genre: Non-fiction
- Publisher: Morrow
- Publication date: 2003
- Publication place: USA
- Media type: Print
- Pages: 334 pp
- ISBN: 0-06-053811-2
- OCLC: 51242214
- Dewey Decimal: 813/.54 21
- LC Class: PS3563.E747 Z56 2003

Amelia Peabody's Egypt: A Compendium is a 2003 non-fiction book, edited by Elizabeth Peters and Kristen Whitbread.

== Background ==
Amelia Peabody's Egypt provides background and commentary for the settings, customs, and characters in the Peters' series of historical mystery novels featuring Amelia Peabody, which take place in Victorian-era and early 20th-century (through the early 1920s) Egypt.

== Reception ==
The book was well received by reviewers and earned Peters some award recognition also. Publishers Weekly stated that the volume "entertainingly blurs fact and fiction" and that the "attractive book both informs and enchants". The work was also featured in Publishers Weekly's "The Year in Books" in 2003 in the mystery category. The book was also well reviewed by Harriet Klausner, for The Best Reviews, who stated that "this is not a Peabody novel, but instead a marvelous glimpse at the history of Egypt", finding it "well written", "fascinating" and "a delight that brings to life the distant past and relatively recent past in a country with a rich heritage of many millenniums".

== Awards ==
The work won the 2003 Agatha Award in the "Best non-fiction" category. It was also nominated for an Edgar Award the following year in the same category.
