= Amelia Peabody series =

1975–2010 mystery novels by Barbara Mertz

Amelia Peabody Series
- First edition cover for Crocodile on the Sandbank (1975), book 1 of the series
- Author: Elizabeth Peters
- Country: United States
- Language: English
- Genre: Historical mystery, Thriller, Satire, Comedy
- Publisher: Morrow/HarperCollins (current)
- Published: 1975–2010, 2017
- Media type: Print (hardback and paperback), audiobook
- No. of books: 20 (List of books)
- Followed by: The Vicky Bliss Mysteries

The Amelia Peabody series is a series of twenty historical mystery novels and one non-fiction companion volume written by Egyptologist Barbara Mertz (1927–2013) under the pen name Elizabeth Peters. The series is centered on the adventures of the unconventional female Egyptologist Amelia Peabody Emerson and an ever-increasing number of family, friends, allies, and characters, both fictional and based on historical figures. The novels blend mystery and romance with a wryly comic tone, and at times also parody Victorian-era adventure novels such as those written by H. Rider Haggard. The series was published between 1975 and 2010, with the final, posthumous novel (completed by Joan Hess) appearing in 2017.

== Plot ==
Amelia Peabody is introduced in the series' first novel, Crocodile on the Sandbank, as a confirmed spinster, suffragist, and scholar, living in England in 1884. She inherits a fortune from her father and leaves England to see the world, with the side benefit of escaping various suitors and family members who were neither aware that she would be the sole beneficiary of her father's estate nor that he had amassed a small fortune over the course of his lifetime.

In Rome, Amelia meets Evelyn Barton-Forbes, a young Englishwoman of social standing who has run off with and then been abandoned by her Italian lover, and the two make their way to Egypt. There they meet the Emerson brothers, Egyptologist Radcliffe and his philologist brother Walter. Over the course of the first book the couples pair up: Amelia marries Radcliffe (referred to throughout the series by his last name "Emerson"), and Evelyn marries Walter.

Following the birth of their son Ramses (né Walter) Emerson ("as swarthy as an Egyptian and as arrogant as a Pharaoh"), the Emersons initially settle in Kent, from where Emerson commutes to a job lecturing in Egyptology at university in London. Despite Amelia's suggestions that he resume seasonal digs in Egypt, Emerson insists on staying in England with his family while Ramses is too young to travel.

Peabody and Emerson return to Egypt at least once without Ramses (The Curse of the Pharaohs) in 1892 before deciding to bring him along on their annual digs (The Mummy Case), beginning in the 1894–95 season. Amelia's desire to explore pyramids is countered by Emerson's refusal to be diplomatic with the Egyptian Service d'Antiquites, resulting in the loss of their firman (permit) to excavate at one of the major pyramid fields, and instead being awarded Mazghuna, a minor pyramid field southwest of Cairo.

While the Emersons are excavating at Mazghuna, they encounter an enigmatic criminal mastermind who runs an illicit underground antiquities trade, stealing artifacts from tombs, which puts him at odds with the Emersons. Amelia initially calls him "The Master Criminal", although his nom de guerre is eventually revealed to be Sethos. Sethos is initially presented as a rival to Emerson for Amelia's affections, but becomes an important part of the Emerson's large circle of friends, allies, and acquaintances in later books when it is revealed that he is Emerson's theretofore unknown half-brother, Seth.

The Emerson family expands again during the 1897–1898 season while on an archaeological expedition to Nubia. The family encounters a hitherto unknown civilization in a remote wadi in the desert (The Last Camel Died at Noon), becomes embroiled in turbulent politics, and discovers Nefret Forth, the daughter of a long-presumed dead explorer. Nefret returns to England with the Emersons and becomes their ward.

Another key character is introduced in the 1899–1900 season (The Hippopotamus Pool): David Todros, the son of Abdullah's estranged daughter and her Christian husband. David is living in a state of semi-slavery, working for a forger of antiquities. He is later taken in by Evelyn and Walter Emerson as a ward. David later marries Evelyn and Walter's daughter Amelia (known as Lia to avoid confusion with her aunt).

The introduction of Nefret initiates a running story arc of sexual tension between her and Ramses. This becomes an important part of the plot in a subset of four books beginning with Seeing a Large Cat, coinciding with the introduction of "excerpts from Manuscript H" in which the younger generation of the family begins a parallel narration to Amelia's. Among the pitfalls in this story arc is the arrival of Sennia, a young girl initially suspected to be Ramses' illegitimate daughter with a local prostitute. Sennia's arrival, and the suspicions about Ramses that it raises, precipitates Nefret's brief marriage to another man. Sennia is revealed to be the child of Amelia's nephew Percival, first seen in Deeds of the Disturber, who is reintroduced as an adult in a villainous role for several volumes beginning with The Falcon at the Portal. Sennia is adopted by the Emersons, who take her back to England at the conclusion of the volume.

The tension between Ramses and Nefret is finally resolved in He Shall Thunder in the Sky, with their marriage taking place at the end of that book and recounted in flashback sequences in the next. The two eventually have three children: a set of fraternal twins (a son, David John, and a daughter, Charlotte, or "Charla"), and an unnamed daughter born after the current conclusion of the series. It is through the youngest daughter that John Tregarth, a character in Peters's Vicky Bliss series, is descended from the Emerson-Peabodys.

Additional characters in the series include members of the large Egyptian family who support the Emersons in their digs. The head of the family is Abdullah ibn al-Wahhab, Emerson's reis or foreman, who supervises their archaeological digs. Abdullah has several children, among them his youngest son, Selim, who, originally assigned as a bodyguard of sorts for Ramses (The Mummy Case), eventually replaces his father as reis (dig supervisor). Abdullah's daughter-in-law, Khadijah, her cooking, and her green healing poultice (which is effective, although its exact contents are never quite determined) are frequently mentioned. After Abdullah's death (The Ape Who Guards the Balance) the character appears to Amelia in dreams as a spiritual guide (although it is left ambiguous whether his appearance is a manifestation of Amelia's own subconsciousness or supernatural in nature).

Chronologically, the latest book in the series (Tomb of the Golden Bird) takes place in 1922–1923, around the discovery of Tutankhamen's tomb.

== Narrative style ==
The earlier books in the series—prior to Seeing a Large Cat—were written entirely as first-person narrative, with the novels purporting to be edited versions of journals kept by Amelia herself. According to the series mythology, the initial cache of journals that provided the narrative for the Amelia Peabody series were discovered in the attic of the ancestral home of the Tregarth family in Cornwall, England, into which Amelia's youngest granddaughter eventually married. This is revealed in the Vicky Bliss series' final installment The Laughter of Dead Kings, in which it is strongly hinted that Peters herself -- "She writes under three names"—is the journals' editor.

Beginning with Seeing a Large Cat, Amelia's narrative is interspersed with excerpts from "Manuscript H," a third person narrative that follows the adventures of the younger generation of the family, the author of which is eventually revealed to be Walter 'Ramses' Emerson. From this point forward other points of view—most often that of Nefret—are occasionally introduced in the form of letters and additional manuscripts.

== Historical figures and setting ==
The series is set primarily in Egypt (see chart below for specific locations) with some installments including scenes set in England, generally at the beginning. Only four installments do not take place in Egypt at all: Deeds of the Disturber, set entirely in England; The Last Camel Died at Noon and Guardian of the Horizon both set primarily in the Sudan; and A River in the Sky, set mostly in Ottoman-era Palestine.

The books span a thirty-nine-year period from 1884 to 1923, which coincides with the period of the British administration of Egypt after the Anglo-Egyptian War. In earlier novels, Sir Evelyn Baring, Lord Cromer, the British consul general to Cairo and de facto ruler of the country at the time, makes occasional cameo appearances. The uneasy relationship between the Egyptians and their European administrators is a running theme throughout the series, especially with regards to foreign oversight of the Egyptian Service d'Antiquities and its allowance of foreign organizations to export artifacts out of Egypt to Europe and the United States rather than keeping them in Egypt.

The series incorporates a number of prominent historical figures from the field of Egyptology as characters, including Howard Carter, William Flinders Petrie, Gaston Maspero, George A. Reisner, and E. A. Wallis Budge, whom Emerson considers an arch-rival (even if the feelings are not mutual). Another recurring character is that of Cyrus Vandergelt, an American entrepreneur who finances a number of archaeological expeditions in the Valley of the Kings (with little success) and becomes a close friend and confidant of the Emerson clan. The Vandergelt character is at least partly based on Theodore Davis, the American entrepreneur who first hired Howard Carter to dig in the Valley of the Kings, and who himself appears in The Ape Who Guards the Balance.

The series incorporates contemporary geo-political events in Egypt and the Middle East into the background as well as directly into the plot. The Mahdist War in the Sudan forms much of the backdrop for The Last Camel Died at Noon, in which an eager Emerson ventures into unstable territory to satisfy a lifelong wish to dig among the Nubian pyramids. The 1906 Dinshawai Incident is mentioned in historical context, and, as a result the character of David Todros (Abdullah's Coptic Christian grandson, who is fostered by the Emerson-Peabodys) becomes involved with the Egyptian nationalist movement.

The character Ramses, thought to be a conscientious objector, is revealed to be working with British intelligence during the First World War, playing a key role in thwarting the Raid on the Suez Canal by Ottoman forces and providing intelligence to the Egyptian Expeditionary Force in their campaigns. As she grows into adulthood, the character Nefret Forth Emerson is trained as a doctor, working among the poor, championing education and rights for Egyptian women, and eventually establishing a hospital in Cairo's red light district that primarily employs females (The Golden One).

== Character inspirations ==
Most of the archaeological achievements attributed to the Emerson-Peabodys were, in reality, accomplished by many of the archaeologists who pass through the novels as supporting characters. For example, the excavations that Emerson and Walter are undertaking at Amarna in 1884 (in Crocodile on the Sandbank) are based on those conducted by Sir William Flinders Petrie in 1891. Peters has indicated that the character of Radcliffe Emerson is based in part on Petrie, whose meticulous excavation habits were legendary and set a new standard for archaeological digs.

Amelia herself was partly inspired by Amelia Edwards, a Victorian novelist, travel writer, and Egyptologist, whose best-selling 1873 book, A Thousand Miles up the Nile is similar in both tone and content to Amelia Emerson's narration. The character was also semi-autobiographical: pressures on Amelia to marry and abandon her Egyptological career in the first book were based on Peters's own experience in academia.

In other instances, fictional accomplishments are ascribed to Amelia and Emerson. For example, the tomb of the 17th Dynasty Queen Tetisheri, whose discovery and excavation form the basis of the plot in The Hippopotamus Pool has, in fact, never been found. Most scholars suggest that the tomb — assuming that it still survives — would be found in the general area where the Emerson-Peabodys discover it. The intact Old Kingdom burial found in The Falcon at the Portal is also fictional; in fact, no intact burials from the Old Kingdom period have ever been found.

== Publication history ==
The first book in the series, Crocodile on the Sandbank, was published in 1975. Initially intended as a standalone novel, Peters did not write a sequel for six years. As the author was juggling several book series written under two pseudonyms, the Amelia Peabody series progressed slowly at first, with new installments published sporadically in intervals varying between two and four years. As the series became more commercially successful in the mid-1990s, however, the pace increased and by the end of the decade new books were appearing at the rate of one annually, with many of the later books in the series appearing on The New York Times Bestseller List for fiction. The 19th and last installment to be published, A River in the Sky, was released in 2010. The series also includes a non-fiction companion book, Amelia Peabody's Egypt: A Compendium.

The first eighteen books in the series were written in chronological order, with the exception of Guardian of the Horizon, which was the 16th book published but 11th in the series chronology. In a 2003 book talk at the Library of Congress, Elizabeth Peters revealed that her overall plan was to continue the series chronologically through World War I and end with the events surrounding the discovery of the tomb of Tutankhamun in 1922, as the aging of the characters in real time presented a challenge to extending the series further. Although her age is given only in the first book, Amelia Peabody would have been seventy years old—and Emerson 67 or 68 — by that point in history, making their often physically trying acts of heroism less and less credible. This stated goal was accomplished with the publication of Tomb of the Golden Bird in 2006. The events of that book wrapped up most of the series' loose plot lines, although it did not bring the series to a definite ending.

In the same talk, Peters stated that installments written after that point would "fill in the gaps" in the series' chronology, as there were gaps of several years between some volumes. The next (and last) book to be published, A River in the Sky (the 19th book in publication order) was retroactively inserted into the series chronology as the 12th book.

Peters had plotted and written part of the twentieth novel in the series, The Painted Queen, at the time of her death in 2013. The manuscript was completed by Peters's friend, the mystery writer Joan Hess, with assistance from Egyptologist Salma Ikram, and was published in July 2017. It is set in the 1912–13 season, making it the fourteenth of the series in chronological order, and deals with the fallout of Nefret's precipitous marriage in The Falcon at the Portal.

The series has been published in English in the United States and the United Kingdom. A varying number of volumes have been translated into other languages, including French, German, Greek, and Japanese.

== Series ==
Book no.	Title	Date of publication (publication order)	Setting	Archaeological Season (chronological order)	peak position on The New York Times bestseller list
01	Crocodile on the Sandbank	1975	Amarna	1884–85	-
02	The Curse of the Pharaohs	1981	Valley of the Kings	1892–93	-
03	The Mummy Case	1985	Mazghuna	1894–95	-
04	Lion in the Valley	1986	Dashur	1895–96	-
05	The Deeds of the Disturber	1988	London and Kent	1896	-
06	The Last Camel Died at Noon	1991	The Lost Oasis (Nubia)	1897–98	-
07	The Snake, the Crocodile, and the Dog	1992	Luxor and Amarna	1898–99	-
08	The Hippopotamus Pool	1996	Dra' Abu el-Naga'	1899–1900	-
09	Seeing a Large Cat	1997	Valley of the Kings	1903–04	-
10	The Ape Who Guards the Balance	1998	Valley of the Kings	1906–07	-
11	Guardian of the Horizon	2004	The Lost Oasis	1907–08	10
12	A River in the Sky	2010	Palestine	1910	05
13	The Falcon at the Portal	1999	Zawyet el'Aryan	1911–12	-
14	The Painted Queen (completed by Joan Hess)	2017	Cairo and Amarna	1912–13	07
15	He Shall Thunder in the Sky	2000	Giza Necropolis	1914–15	13
16	Lord of the Silent	2001	Giza Necropolis and Luxor	1915–16	10
17	The Golden One	2002	Gaza and Deir el-Medina	1916–17	08
18	Children of the Storm	2003	Deir el-Medina	1919–20	11
19	The Serpent on the Crown	2005	Valley of the Kings	1921–22	10
20	Tomb of the Golden Bird	2006	Valley of the Kings	1922–23	07

== Other locations ==
- Luxor (previously Thebes)
- Deir el-Bahri
- Cairo
- Alexandria
- Gaza
- London

== See also ==
- List of characters in the Amelia Peabody series

== Sources ==
- Maps and timelines of the Emersons' travels at the official Amelia Peabody website; previously available at AmeliaPeabody.com, and archived at the Internet Archive. August 2015 "Maps" and Timeline
- The Peabody-Emerson Excavations 1884-1923, including a map of sites along the Nile River
