= Zerzura (film) =

2017 Nigerien western film

- Directed by: Christopher Kirkley
- Written by: Christopher Kirkley; Rhissa Koutata; Ahmoudou Madassane; Guichene Mohamed
- Produced by: Christopher Kirkley; Rhissa Koutata; Ahmoudou Madassane; Guichene Mohamed
- Starring: Habiba Almoustapha; Ahmoudou Madassane; Ibrahim Affi; Zara Alhassane
- Edited by: Christopher Kirkley
- Music by: Ahmoudou Madassane
- Production companies: Imouhar Studio; Sahel Sounds
- Distributed by: ChromaColor
- Release date: 19 June 2017 (United States)
- Running time: 87 minutes
- Countries: Niger; United States
- Language: Tamashek

Zerzura is a 2017 Nigerien western film directed by Christopher Kirkley and co-produced by director himself with Rhissa Koutata, Ahmoudou Madassane, and Guichene Mohamed. The film stars Habiba Almoustapha with Ahmoudou Madassane, Ibrahim Affi, and Zara Alhassane in supporting roles. It is an ethnofiction shot in the Sahara desert, where a young man from Niger leaves home in search of an enchanted oasis.

The film was shot in Agadez, Niger. The film premiered on 19 July 2017 in the United States. The film received mixed reviews from critics and screened in many film festivals.

== Cast ==
- Habiba Almoustapha as Habiba
- Ahmoudou Madassane as Ahmoudou
- Ibrahim Affi as Uncle
- Zara Alhassane as Mother
- Rhissa Elryin as Man in hole
- Guichene Mohamed as Bandit #1
- Rhissa Koutata as Bandit #2
