= The Vicky Bliss Mysteries =

Mystery novel series by Barbara Mertz, writing as Elizabeth Peters

The Vicky Bliss Mysteries is a mystery novel series by Barbara Mertz, writing as Elizabeth Peters. A published Egyptologist, Mertz wrote three mystery series and a number of stand-alone novels under the name Elizabeth Peters plus gothic and supernatural thrillers under the name Barbara Michaels.

The Vicky Bliss novels are set in late 20th century Europe and Egypt. The author said that the internal chronology of the series is inconsistent with historic time; the characters age only a few years, while the novels were written over a span of forty years.

== Series ==
1. The Camelot Caper (1969) (another title - Her Cousin John)
2. Borrower of the Night (1973)
3. Street of the Five Moons (1978)
4. Silhouette in Scarlet (1983)
5. Trojan Gold (1987)
6. Night Train to Memphis (1994)
7. The Laughter of Dead Kings (2008)

== Characters ==
=== Victoria Bliss ===
Doctor Victoria Bliss is an American art historian with Swedish heritage. She is a tall, statuesque blonde whose physical beauty means some people do not take her seriously - as an art historian or a detective. She specializes in medieval art and, after Borrower of the Night, works for Professor Schmidt at the National Museum in Munich. She and John first became involved during her investigation of his activities in Rome (Street of the Five Moons).

=== John Tregarth ===
John Tregarth, alias Sir John Smythe, is a master criminal who specializes in art forgeries; he may or may not be reforming from his criminal life. He inherited the family home, a decaying manor in Cornwall, from his maternal grandfather Arthur Tregarth, who had an obsession with everything Arthurian. John has a difficult relationship with his mother Guinevere (known as Jen). In The Laughter of Dead Kings, it is revealed that he is a descendant of the 'Peabody-Emerson' family featured in Mertz' Amelia Peabody series.

=== Anton Z. Schmidt ===
Herr Professor Anton Z. Schmidt is Vicky's rotund, jovial boss. His physical attributes and phenomenal appetite means that he, like Vicky, is sometimes not taken seriously. But he is smart and courageous, has an incredible memory and a strong sense of adventure fueled by his great imagination.
