= Elizabeth Mertz =

American legal anthropologist

Elizabeth Mertz is a linguistic and legal anthropologist who is also a law professor at the University of Wisconsin Law School, where she teaches family law courses. She has been on the research faculty of the American Bar Foundation since 1989. She has a PhD in Anthropology from Duke University (where she studied with Virginia R. Domínguez and William O'Barr) and a JD from Northwestern University (where she was the John Paul Stevens scholar and a Wigmore Scholar). Her early research focused on language, identity and politics in Cape Breton, Nova Scotia, and her dissertation dealt with language shift in Cape Breton Scottish Gaelic, drawing on semiotic anthropology.

Her later research examines the language of U.S. legal education in detail using linguistic anthropological approaches (see her book The Language of Law School).

She writes on semiotics, anthropology, and law, among other topics. She has been editor of Law & Social Inquiry and of PoLAR: Political and Legal Anthropology Review.

== Personal ==
She is the daughter of the late Barbara Mertz.

== Publications ==
- 2007. The Language of Law School: Learning to 'Think Like a Lawyer (Oxford: Oxford University Press).
- 2007. [Macaulay, Friedman, & Mertz] Law In Action: A Socio-Legal Reader (New York: Foundation Press).
- 2002. [Greenhouse, Mertz, & Warren, eds.] Ethnography in Unstable Places: Everyday Lives in Contexts of Dramatic Political Change (Durham, NC: Duke University Press).
- 1992. "Language, law and social meanings: linguistic anthropological contributions to the study of law." Law & Society Review 26(2):413-445.
- 1985. [Mertz & Parmentier]Semiotic Mediation: Sociocultural and Psychological Perspectives (Orlando, FL: Academic Press).
