= Northern Mazghuna pyramid =

Ancient Egyptian royal tomb

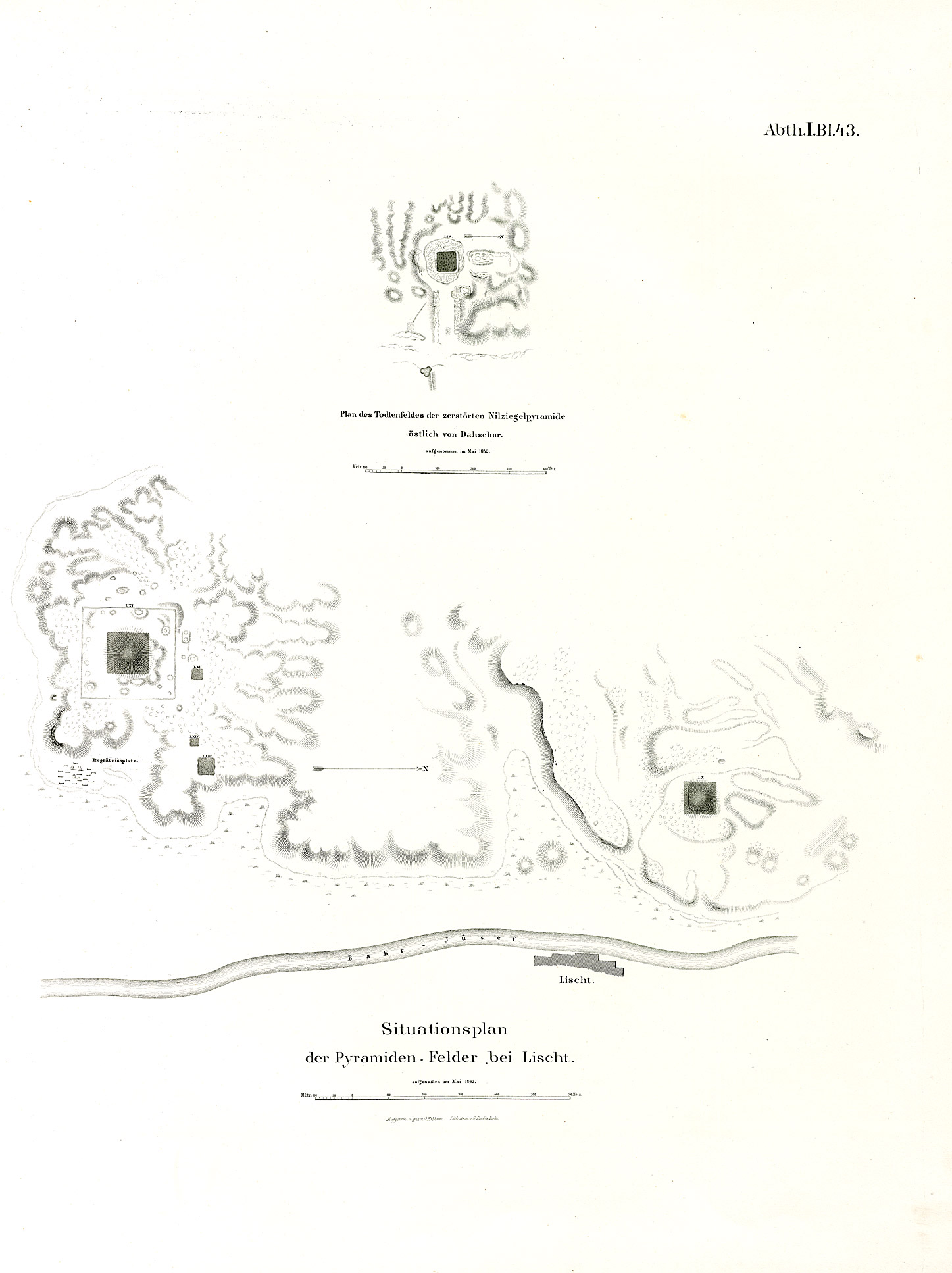

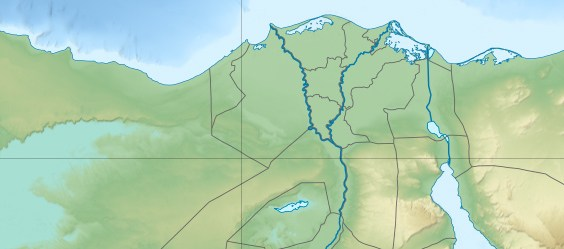
- Location within Lower Egypt
- 29°46′3″N 31°13′15″E
- Constructed: 12th or 13th Dynasty
- Type: True pyramid
- Material: Mudbrick

The northern Mazghuna pyramid is the funerary monument built for an undetermined Egyptian pharaoh of the 12th or 13th Dynasty in Mazghuna, 5 km (3.1 mi) south of Dahshur. The building remained unfinished, and it is still unknown which pharaoh was really intended to be buried here since no appropriate inscription has been found. The pyramid was rediscovered in 1910 by Ernest Mackay and excavated in the following year by Flinders Petrie.

== Mortuary complex ==
=== Main pyramid ===
There are no remains evidencing the existence of a superstructure, with the only information that can be gleaned from the site being that the northern pyramid was planned on a larger scale than its southern neighbour which had a known base length of about 52.5 m (172 ft 3 in; 100.2 cu) – Christoffer Theis offers an approximation of 64 m (210 ft 0 in; 122 cu). Ernest Mackay interpreted the lack of any remains to mean that the superstructure had been built entirely of limestone – a mudbrick core would have left traces behind – that was later thoroughly dismantled; Mark Lehner suggests that work on the superstructure had never begun.

=== Substructure ===
The hypogeum is similar to that of the southern pyramid but much more tortuous, changing direction six times. The entrance is on the north side. From there, a staircase leads down to a square chamber and then to another staircase and to the first quartzite blocking. After that, two other chambers are connected by a passage with a second, still unsealed blocking. After the third chamber, a stairway and then a corridor leads to the antechamber just prior to the large burial chamber: this room, partially covered by an inverted V-shaped ceiling, is entirely filled by a huge sarcophagus-vault, which was carved from a single block of quartzite. The never-used sarcophagus lid, a 42-ton quartzite slab, still awaits to be fitted in the chamber. All exposed quartzite, which was built in the pyramid, had been painted with red paint and sometimes also decorated with vertical black stripes. The function of a large room behind the burial chamber remain unknown.

=== Causeway and temples ===
There are no traces of a valley or mortuary temple, or of the enclosure walls – like the one that exists at the southern pyramid. Mackay had discovered a 15.4 m (50 ft 6 in) long section of a north–south oriented mudbrick retaining wall that he originally thought belonged to the enclosure, but this had been built to control debris and keep the site level. The only other significant remains of the wider complex discovered were a section of the east–west oriented causeway built to serve the workforce as they brought in materials for the project and a large stone block found abandoned to its south. The causeway had an inner path measuring 43.74 m (143 ft 6 in) wide by 116.43 m (382 ft 0 in) long that was bordered on the north and south by double mudbrick walls and terminated 36.35 m (119 ft 3 in) east of the tomb's entrance. These were much thicker on their outer side than inner and had an 11.68 m (38 ft 4 in) wide void between packed with debris.

== Attribution ==
When the two Mazghuna pyramids were rediscovered, scholars noticed many structural similarities between those two and Amenemhat III's pyramid at Hawara; for this reason the southern pyramid was attributed to the son and successor of this king, Amenemhat IV. Subsequently, the northern pyramid was attributed to the female-pharaoh Sobekneferu, sister of Amenemhat IV and last ruler of the 12th Dynasty.

However, some scholars such as William C. Hayes believed that the two Mazghuna pyramids were built during the 13th Dynasty, on the basis of some similarities with the pyramid of Khendjer. In this case, the northern pyramid should have belonged to one of the many pharaohs who ruled between the beginning of the 13th Dynasty and the loss of control of the northern territory occurred during or after the reign of Merneferre Ay.

Comparison of substructure layout of the late Twelfth and Thirteenth Dynasty pyramids

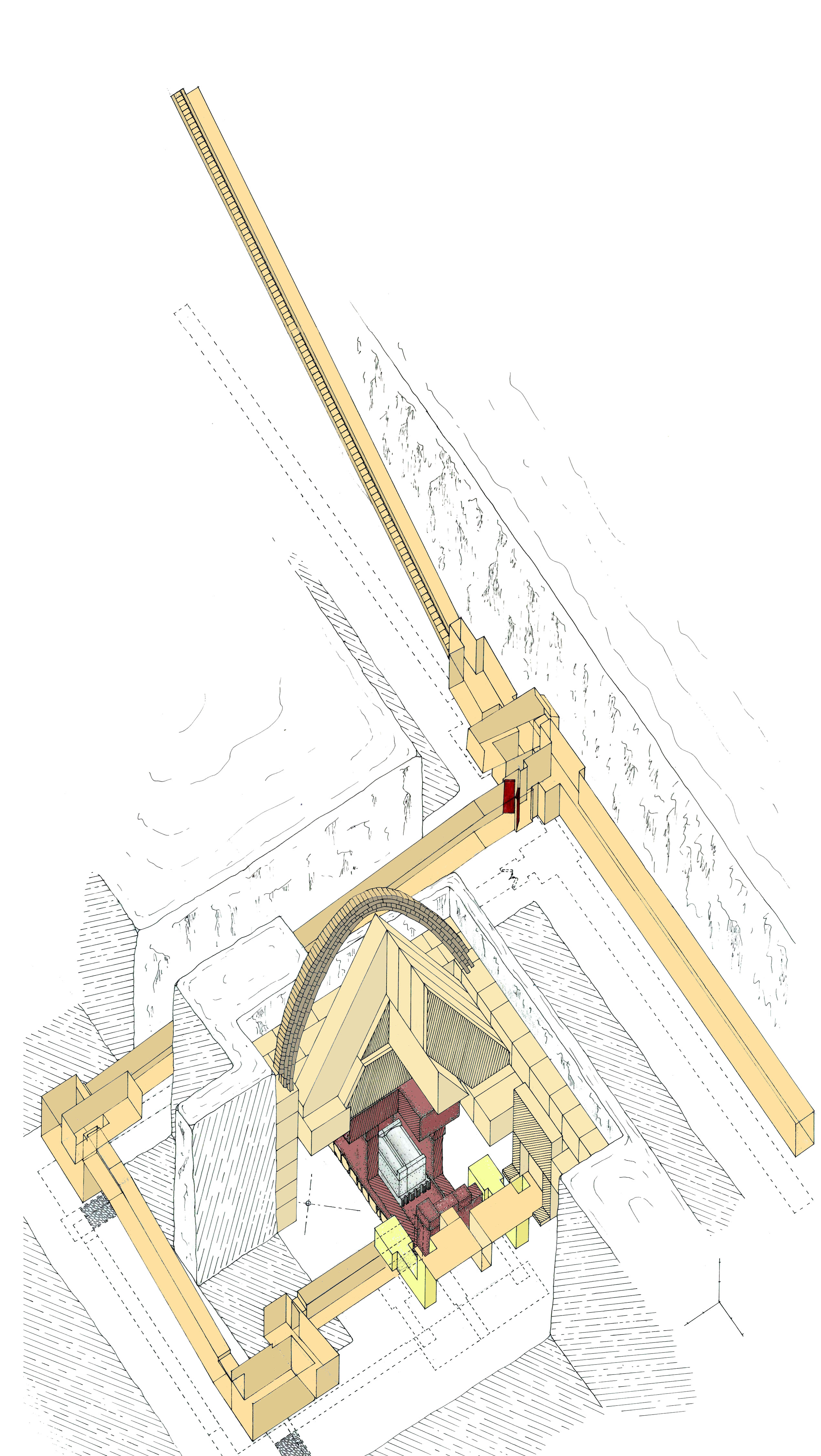
Amenemhat III at Hawara

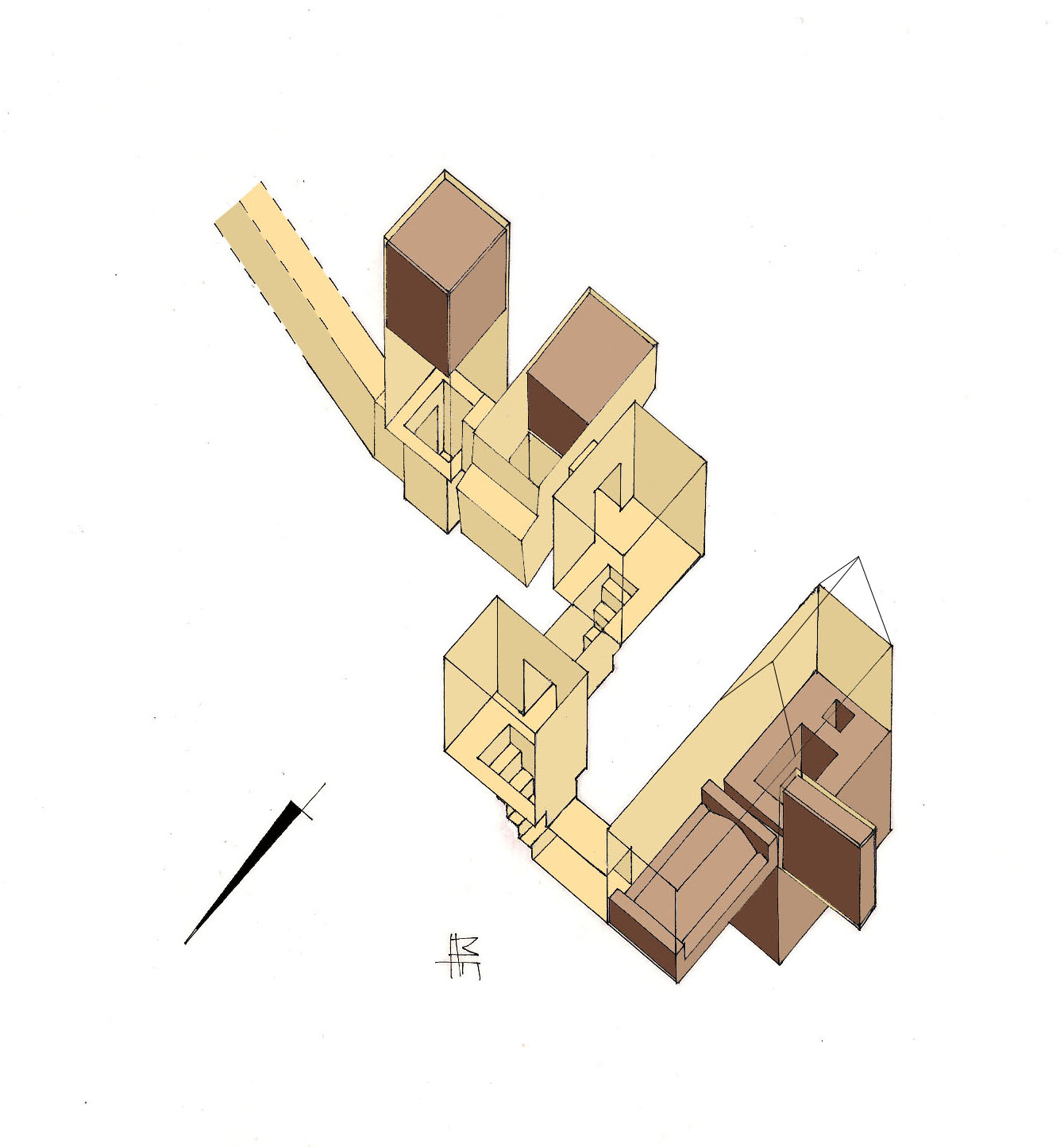
Ameny-Qemau

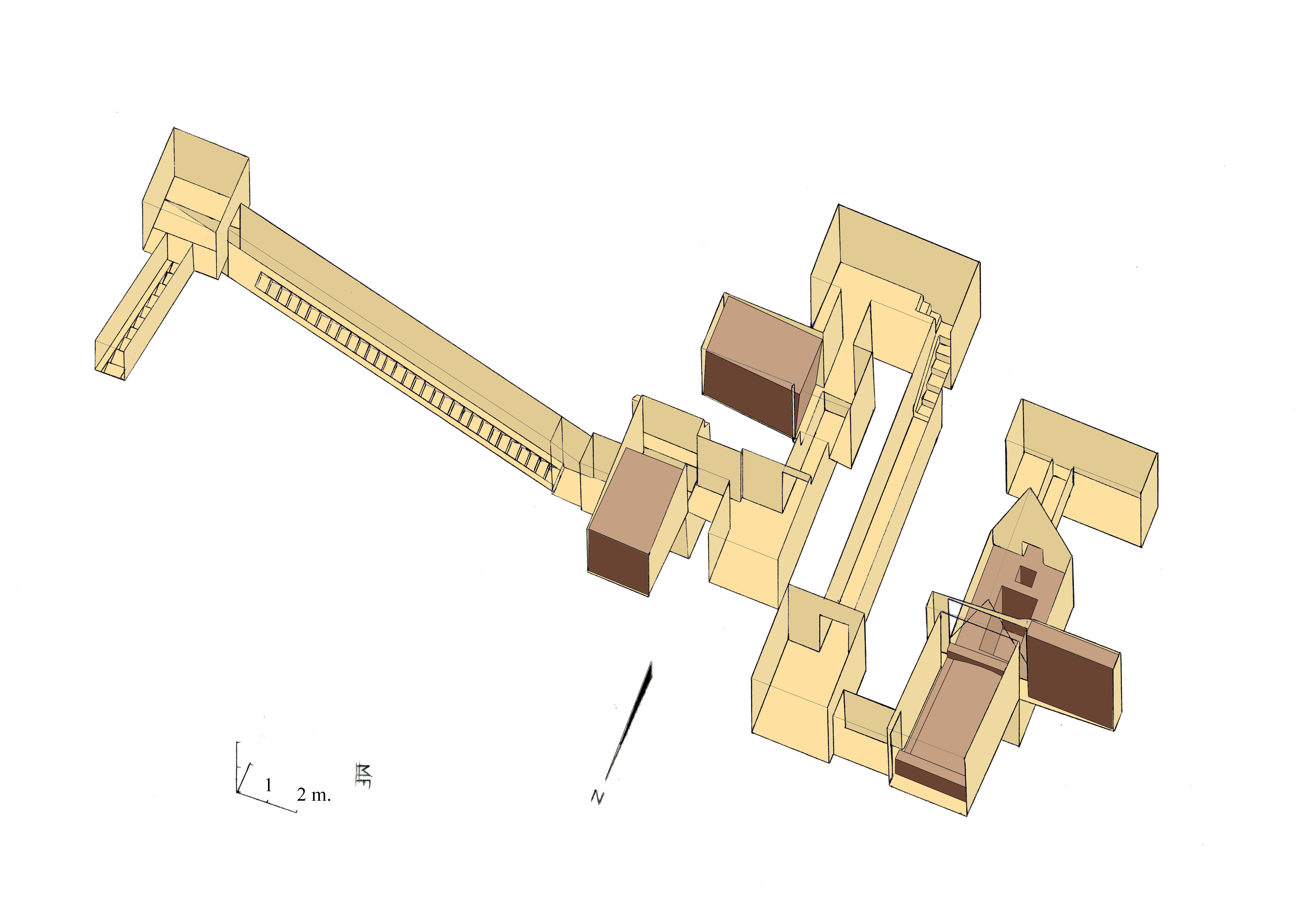
North Mazghuna

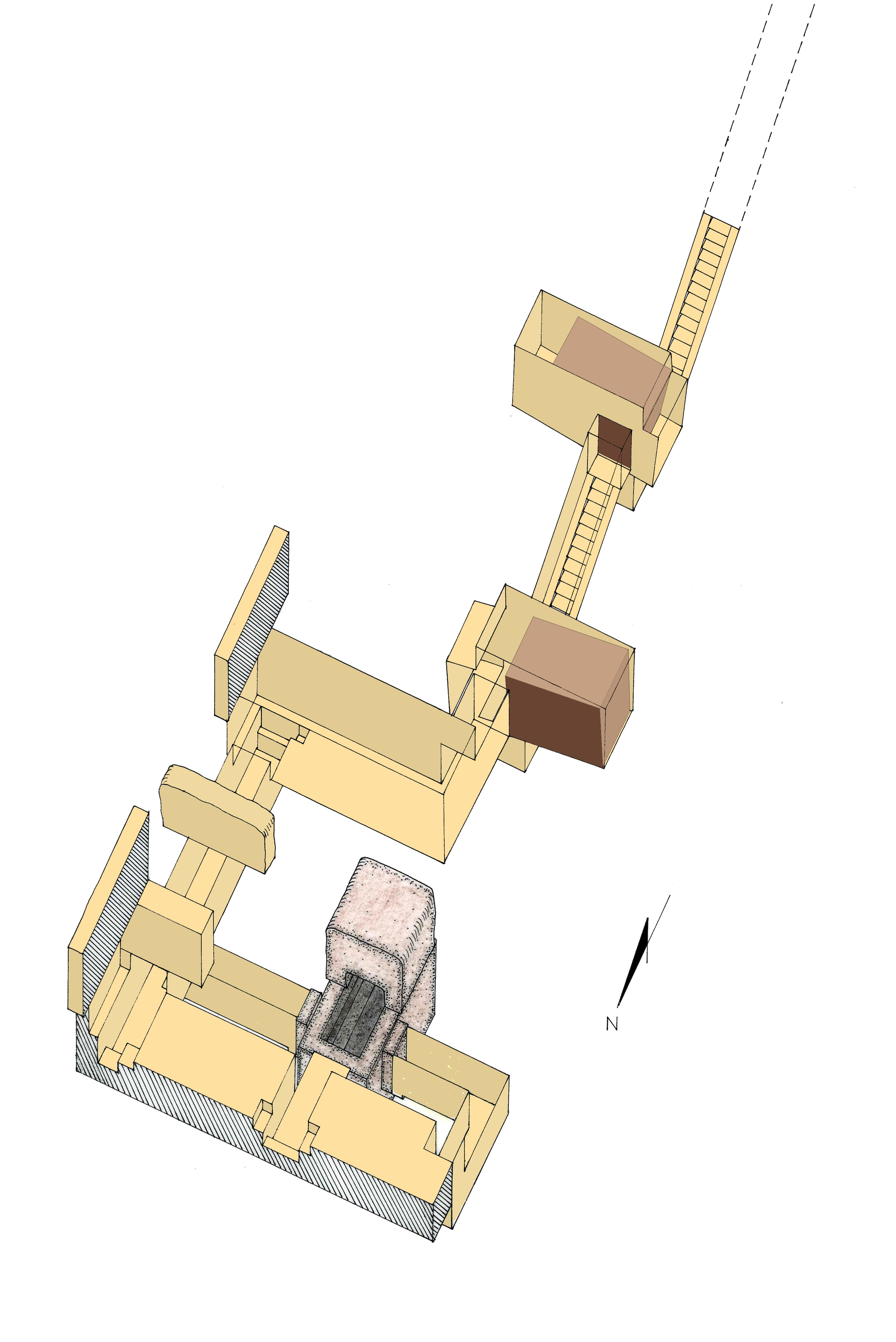
South Mazghuna

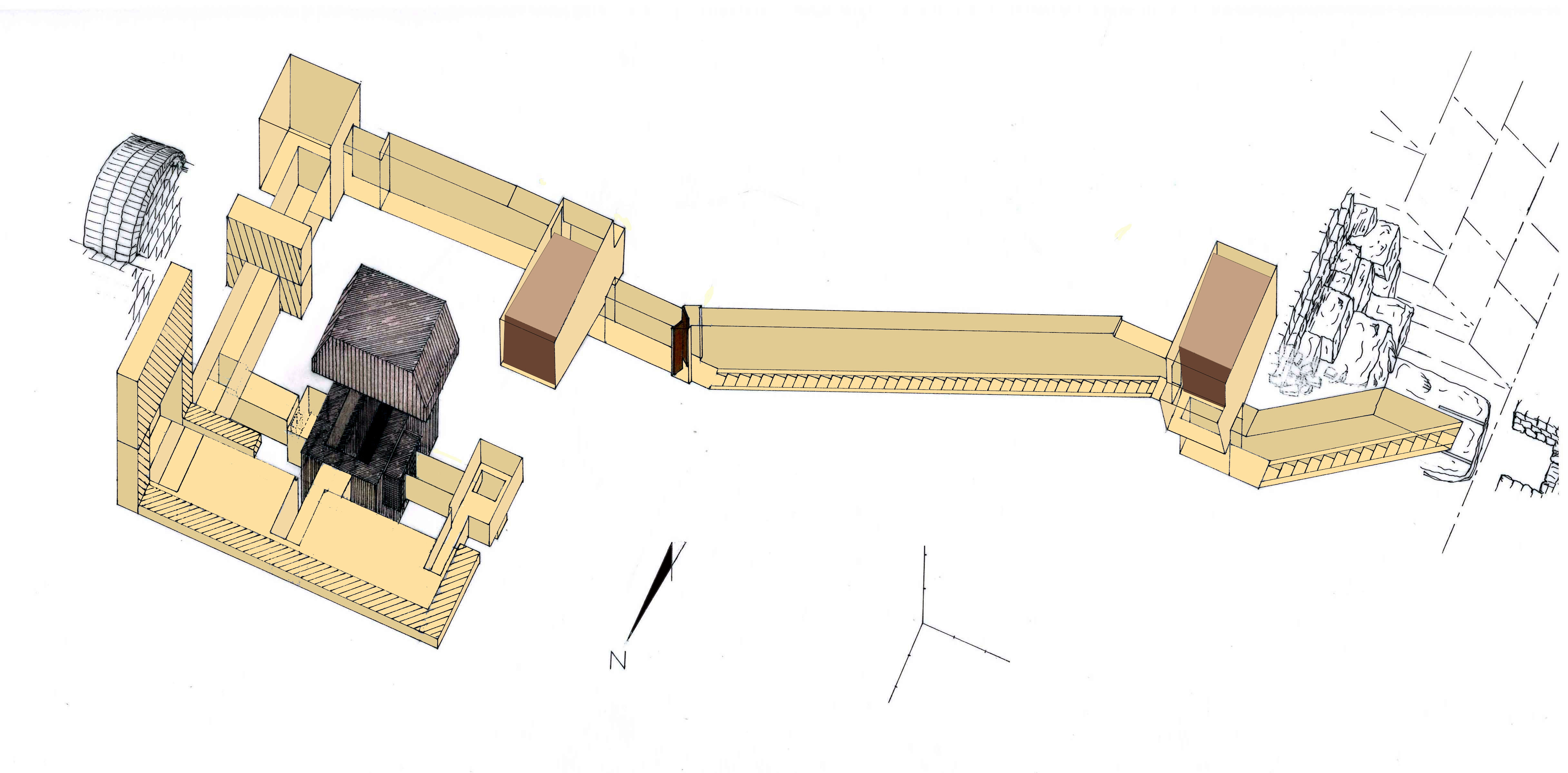
Khendjer

== See also ==
- List of Egyptian pyramids

== Sources ==
- Badawy, Alexander (1966). A History of Egyptian Architecture: The First Intermediate Period, the Middle Kingdom, and the Second Intermediate Period. Berkeley & Los Angeles: University of California Press.
- Dodson, Aidan (1987). "The Tombs of the Kings of the Thirteenth Dynasty in the Memphite Necropolis". Zeitschrift für Ägyptische Sprache und Altertumskunde. 114 (1–2): 36–45. doi:10.1524/zaes.1987.114.12.36. ISSN 0044-216X.
- Fakhry, Ahmed (1969) [1961]. The Pyramids. Chicago: University of Chicago Press.
- Hayes, William (1978) [1946]. The Scepter of Egypt: A Background for the Study of the Egyptian Antiquities in the Metropolitan Museum of Art, Part 1. From the Earliest Times to the End of the Middle Kingdom. New York: Metropolitan Museum of Art. ISBN 0-87099-190-6.
- Jéquier, Gustave (1933). Fouilles à Saqqarah: Deux Pyramides du Moyen Empire (in French). Le Caire: l'Institut Français d'Archéologie Orientale.
- Landua-McCormack, Dawn (2008). Dynasty XIII Kingship in Ancient Egypt: A Study of Political Power and Administration through an Investigation of the Royal Tombs of the Late Middle Kingdom (Doctor of Philosophy thesis). Ann Arbor, MI: UMI Dissertation Services.
- Lehner, Mark (2008) [1997]. The Complete Pyramids. New York: Thames & Hudson. ISBN 978-0-500-28547-3.
- Petrie, William Matthew Flinders; Wainwright, Gerald Avery; Mackay, Ernest (1912). The Labyrinth, Gerzeh and Mazghuneh. Oxford: Bernard Quaritch.
- Swelim, Nabil; Dodson, Aidan (1998). "On the Pyramid of Ameny-Qemau and its Canopic Equipment". Mitteilungen des Deutschen Archäologischen Instituts Abteilung Kairo. 54. Mainz/Rhein: Philipp von Zabern: 319–334, tafel 54–55. ISBN 9783805324175. ISSN 0342-1279.
- Theis, Christoffer (2009a). "Die chronologische Abfolge der Pyramiden der 13. Dynastie" [The chronological order of the Pyramids of the 13th Dynasty]. Sokar (in German). Berlin: Michael Haase. pp. 52–61.
- Theis, Christoffer (2009b). "Die Pyramiden der. 13. Dynastie". Studien zur Altägyptischen Kultur (in German). Bd. 38. Hamburg: Helmut Buske Verlag GmbH: 311–342. ISSN 0340-2215. JSTOR 27751379.
- Verner, Miroslav (2001) [1999]. The Pyramids: The Mystery, Culture and Science of Egypt's Great Monuments. New York: Grove Press. ISBN 978-0-8021-1703-8.
