= Tomb of the Golden Bird =

Book by Barbara Mertz

- First edition cover
- Author: Elizabeth Peters
- Cover artist: Phill Singer
- Language: English
- Series: Amelia Peabody series mysteries
- Genre: Historical mystery
- Publisher: HarperCollins
- Publication date: 2006
- Publication place: United States
- Media type: Print (hardback & paperback)
- Pages: xii, 381
- ISBN: 0-06-059180-3
- OCLC: 62878412
- Dewey Decimal: 813/.54 22
- LC Class: PS3563.E747 T66 2006
- Preceded by: The Serpent on the Crown

Tomb of the Golden Bird is the 18th (in order of writing) in a series of historical mystery novels, written by Elizabeth Peters and first published in 2006. It features fictional sleuth and archaeologist Amelia Peabody. The story is set in the 1922–1923 archeological dig season in Egypt, and is the final novel in the internal chronological scheme of the series.

== Explanation of the novel's title ==
The title comes from the nickname given the tomb of Tutankhamon by Egyptian workers, who were fascinated by Howard Carter's pet canary, and certain that the golden bird would bring a lucky season.

== Plot summary ==
In October 1922, the Emersons are in Cairo. Amelia and her son Ramses greet Emerson and Egyptologist Howard Carter. Carter works for Lord Carnarvon; they will look for a royal tomb this season in the Valley of the Kings, the east section. Many hope Carter will find the tomb of Tutankhamun, one of the only pharaohs whose tomb has not yet been found.

Ramses' wife Nefret and their 5-year-old twins David John and Charla return from a visit to Selim, Emerson's reis (foreman).

Friend Cyrus Vandergelt, his adopted son Bertie and Jumana are working with the Emersons in the west side of the Valley of the Kings. Jumana is the first Egyptologist who is both Egyptian and female.

The Emersons travel on to Luxor by train, settling in their compound of houses, one for Emerson and Amelia and another for Ramses and Nefret. Nefret, a physician, has a clinic there. They notice they are being watched in Luxor, as their hotel rooms were searched in Cairo, strangers approach little Charla. One man leads Emerson and Ramses to a store with six men wanting information from them. Getting none, the six set fire to the store as they leave. Father and son pour salt to smother the fire, and leave safely.

They realize these intruders are seeking Sethos. Soon, Sethos, afflicted with a recurrence of malaria, slips into the house, unseen by their guards. Ramses sees him with no disguise for the first time and Nefret arrives to treat his malaria. Sethos has been on the run, having seized a coded message in this time of unrest in post-war Syria, Iraq and Egypt. The European powers are carving up the Middle East.

Carter begins work on the east side of Valley of the Kings. His crew find cut steps, and a door with seals in the plaster coating, indicating the entry to a tomb, an undisturbed tomb. Emerson hovers, argues, sneaks around the site, as excited as any archaeologist, about this discovery. Carter covers up what he found, and stops work to wire Lord Carnarvon to arrive from England, to see the next sight with him. Word spreads in Egypt; the site is guarded from local tomb raiders.

Emerson hires Suzanne Malraux, artist, and Nadji Farid, excavator. They will live at the house of Cyrus, and work in the West Valley. Ramses has translations to finish from last season's dig at the town for workers at Deir el Medina, and new work coming from the tomb of Ay, this season's dig.

Once Lord Carnarvon arrives, excavation proceeds. The high and intense excitement of finding the only tomb with nearly all the funeral goods of Egyptian pharaohs infects all. Other tombs had been raided in ancient times, long before modern archaeologists, with people finding immediate use for the goods meant to serve the pharaohs in the afterlife.

A daylight peek of the goods by Carter attracts thieves, collectors, reporters, and Emerson, Amelia, Ramses and Sethos, then Jumana and Bertie. Emerson insults Lord Carnarvon, cutting him off from future visits.

Amelia has Daoud kidnap Margaret Minton, wife of Sethos, for her protection. Margaret is not pleased, but does appreciate the need. She is angry that Sethos is still working for British intelligence. She escapes to a hotel by hitting Amelia on the head and stealing her clothes.

David Todros, Sennia and the butler Gargery arrive for a Christmas season visit. They have a wonderful Christmas; two days later, items are carried out of Tut's tomb to another tomb, so David can see one item, a cabinet in rich colors. He wants to make a painting of it.

David takes a walk at night; Ramses follows him to Luxor. David sought Bashir of the nationalist group in the Great War (He Shall Thunder in the Sky), still wanting a change in government, saying it would be a "bloodless coup". Then David learns this radical group is watching Ramses and the family, and had written the coded message taken by Sethos. David realizes his error in connecting with them. The two combine efforts and escape home.

At the same time, Sethos confesses to seizing his wife on Christmas Eve, and explains his recent work, trying to find the leaders of a planned coup. He thinks the coded message is a fake, but knows the names of the leaders under threat. Emerson, Amelia, Nefret and Sethos fetch Margaret.

All at home, Amelia convenes a council of war. They return to the house from which David and Ramses escaped, meeting the police there. Back home, the stories known to David and to Sethos differ. Ramses and Nefret go to Cairo to tell Russell both stories. In Cairo, Bashir warns them and is instantly killed, attracting the police. Ramses and Nefret tell Russell of the plot in two nations. They next visit Mr Smith.

As soon as he was given the coded message, Ramses figures the code needs a book to reveal its value—keyed to page and word on the page. He has no luck with books at hand. After Christmas, when Ramses and Nefret are in Cairo, Amelia has a popular romantic novel in the house; that is the right book. The message indicates three assassinations planned for New Year's Day, not a bloodless coup. She tells Sethos. The decoded message startles him.

Ramses and Nefret wire that they are fine and coming on the night train. Mr Smith, boss for Sethos, comes with them. He misled Sethos about the coded message. The real instigators are businesses that can profit from chaos in Iraq and Egypt, businesses Smith cannot reach; instead he goes after lower level actors, like the assassins. Sethos submits his resignation in front of Smith, Emerson, Amelia and Margaret. Margaret is happy.

Who is the spy on the Emersons? The boy Emerson uses to spy on Carter. Mr Smith leaves.

Cyrus reported that Suzanne and Nadji are gone from the house, unseen. The explanation is obvious to Amelia. They eloped. Her grandfather does not support their marriage and is urged to leave town.

The New Year's Eve party is at the home of Cyrus. Amelia tries for one more couple, by speaking to Jumana and then to Bertie. They get engaged.

They spend a morning at King Tut's tomb, as the Christmas visitors are soon to leave. Howard Carter comes out asking for David. He asks David to make a drawing of one object, in the storage tomb, on the spot. Sethos intervened with a fake telegram to gain that result.

Amelia brings up the changes in Ramses and Nefret's future to Emerson. They expect another child and will settle in Cairo before the baby is born. Amelia says it will be a girl.

Amelia and Emerson are on their own. They plan to use their dahabeah again.

== Reviews ==
Kirkus Reviews finds the interplay between the fictional and the real characters (real people in history, like Howard Carter and Lord Carnarvon) the most interesting aspect of this historical novel: “The political machinations are less interesting than the competition between the archaeologists and the Emerson family.” The author “has great fun dressing her characters up in Victorian finery and outpost-of-the-empire attitudes.” which determines the writing style.

Publishers Weekly liked this last novel in the series (no later-published novel goes beyond the 1922 dig season) whose focus is on the 1922 discovery of King Tut’s intact tomb, calling it “absorbing” and “irresistible”. “Once again Peters delivers an irresistible mix of archeology, action, humor and a mystery that only the redoubtable Amelia can solve.”

Audio File Magazine noted that in this novel “an aural bazaar of characters is in play as a somewhat peevish Howard Carter makes the find of the century, the unplundered tomb of King Tutankhamen, while the Emerson-Peabody clan watches in envy from the sidelines.” They compliment the narrator of the audio book Barbara Rosenblat, who “seems to gain panache with each outing” in this series, for her “talent for drama and dazzling gift for accents.”

== Connection to real events ==
The 1922 discovery of King Tut’s tomb was a major finding and an event that affected Egypt’s politics as well as knowledge of its long history.

Debates continue today about whether this tomb is part of another tomb, the queen Nefertiti. One researcher believes this is true, but there is no support in Egypt for breaking through a wall in Tut’s tomb to test the theory.

== Publication history ==
This novel was a Best Seller on The New York Times fiction list in 2006.

Unlike earlier novels in this series, the book includes an Afterword with more of the story of the treasures in this tomb after January 2023, including the death of Lord Carnarvon in spring and the work done by Howard Carter until 1930 to finish the job. There is also a List of Characters with their names and connections to others, helpful to readers who may need reminders.

== See also ==
- List of characters in the Amelia Peabody series
