= The Copenhagen Connection =

1982 mystery novel by Elizabeth Peters

- Author: Barbara Mertz
- Language: English
- Publication date: 1982

The Copenhagen Connection is a 1982 mystery novel by American writer Barbara Mertz, published under the pseudonym Elizabeth Peters. It tells the story of American scholar Elizabeth Jones who during a sabbatical in Copenhagen, Denmark, meets her idol, brilliant Nobel Prize-Laureate Margaret Rosenberg in Copenhagen Airport and becomes her private assistant. Shortly after, Rosenberg is kidnapped and Jones sets out to find her.
