= Southern Mazghuna pyramid =

Construction in Egypt

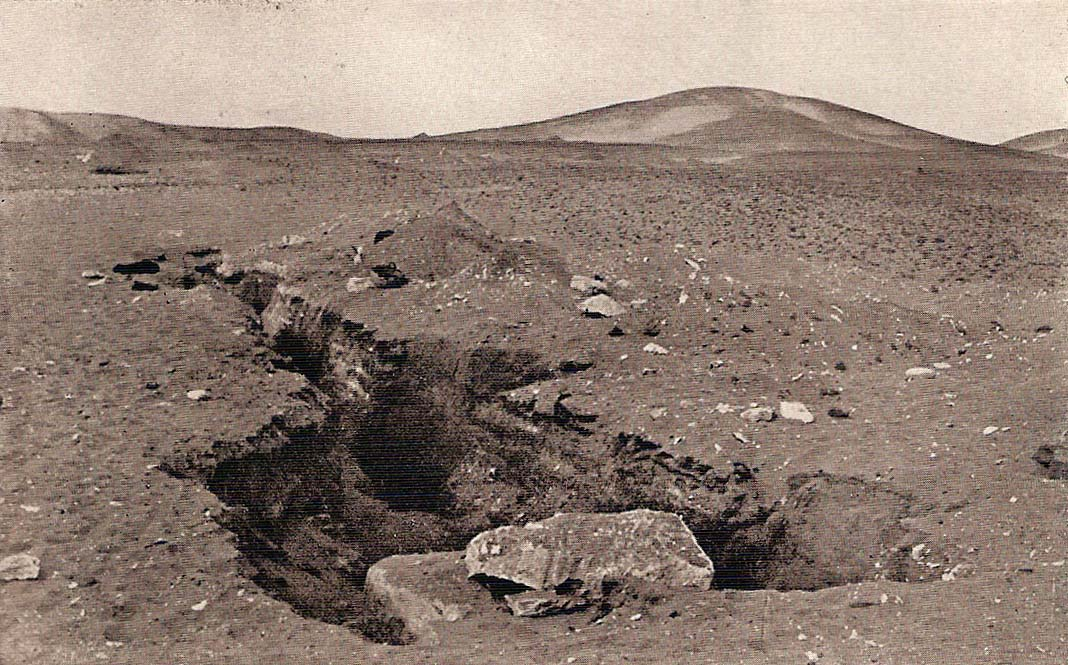

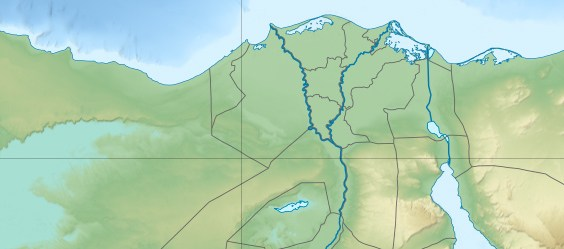
- Location within Lower Egypt
- 29°45′42″N 31°13′15″E
- Type: True pyramid
- Material: Mudbrick
- Base: 52.5 m (172 ft)

The southern Mazghuna pyramid is an ancient Egyptian royal tomb which was built during the 12th or the 13th Dynasty in Mazghuna, 5 km south of Dahshur, Egypt. The building was never finished, and is still unknown which pharaoh was the owner, since no appropriate inscription have been found. The pyramid was rediscovered in 1910 by Ernest Mackay and excavated in the following year by Flinders Petrie.

== Dating ==
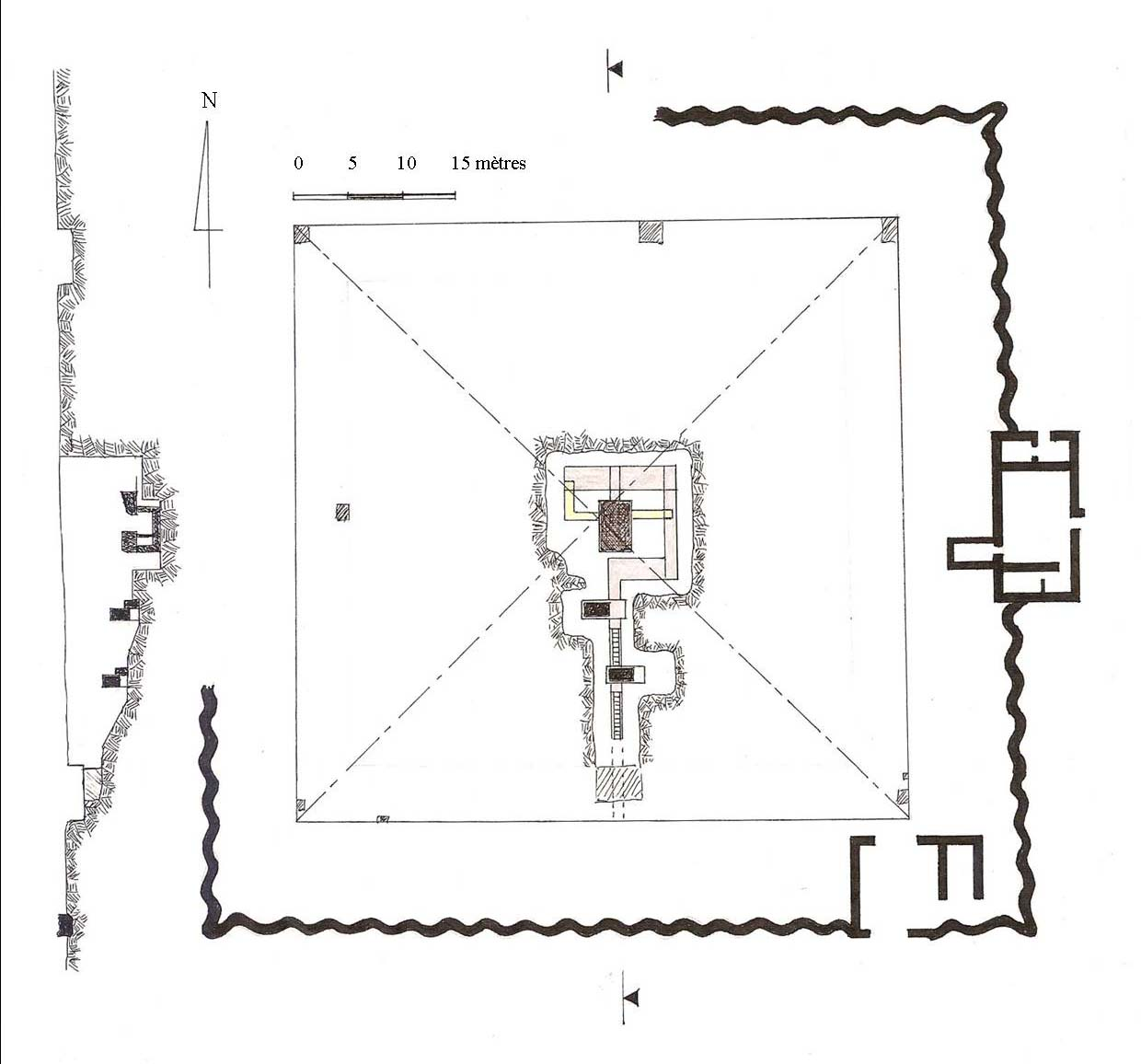
Plan of the southern Mazghuna pyramid

The pyramid can be dated to either late 12th Dynasty or early 13th Dynasty.

=== 12th Dynasty ===
The pyramid might date to the 12th Dynasty, as the building shares some structural similarities to the Hawara pyramid of Amenemhat III. For this reason it is usually attributed to Amenemhat IV, while the northern Mazghuna pyramid is attributed to Sobekneferu.

=== 13th Dynasty ===
William C. Hayes (1953) believed that the southern pyramid was built during the 13th Dynasty, on the basis of some similarities with the pyramid of Khendjer. In this case, it could have belonged to one of the many pharaohs who ruled in the 13th Dynasty.

== Description ==
The pyramid has a side length of 52.5 m (172 ft). The core masonry consists of mudbricks and only reaches a height of one to two layers. Casing stones were not found; therefore, it is impossible to determine information about the planned inclination angle and total height.

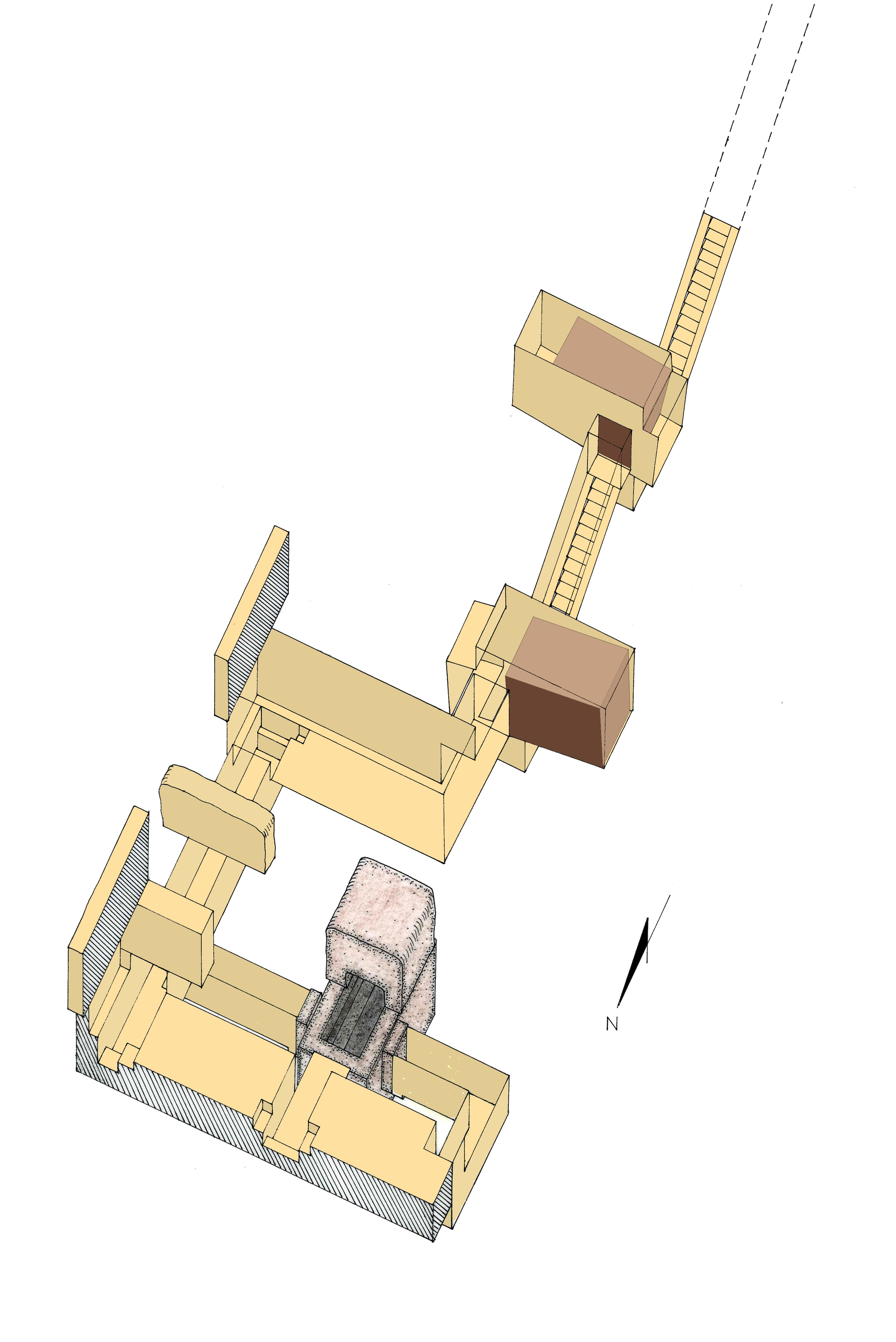
Plan of the hypogeum

The entrance of the pyramid is located in the middle of the south side. A staircase leads down to a short horizontal passage. Here is a wall niche, from where a blocking stone had been pushed into the passage. Another staircase leads to a second block, which, however, is still in its niche.
Finally a U-shaped chamber system leads to the burial chamber, which is topped by a gable roof. There was an empty – but used – quartzite sarcophagus and some few grave goods (three limestone lamps, an alabaster duck-shaped vessel, a make-up vessel made from the same material and a piece of polished soapstone) were found in it.

The complex is surrounded by a wavy wall, which incorporate the remains of the chapel in the middle of the east side; it consists of a large central chamber with two chambers on each side of the storehouse. The central chamber was attached in its southwestern corner with a sacrificial hall with a vaulted roof.

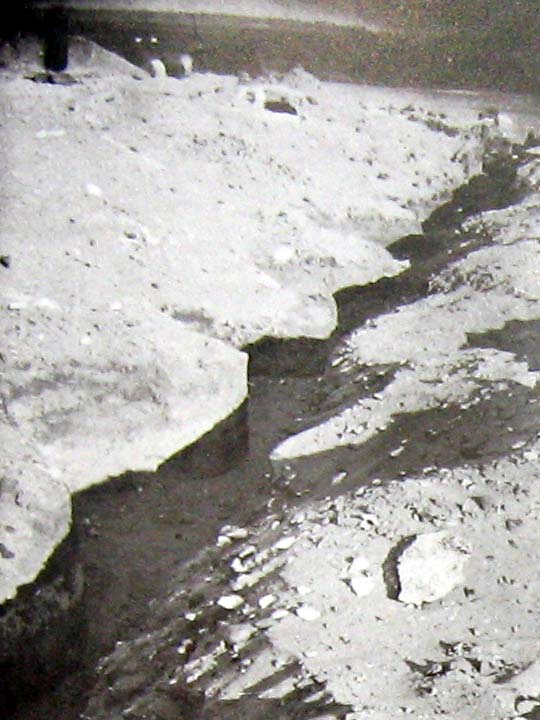
The enclosure wall of the complex

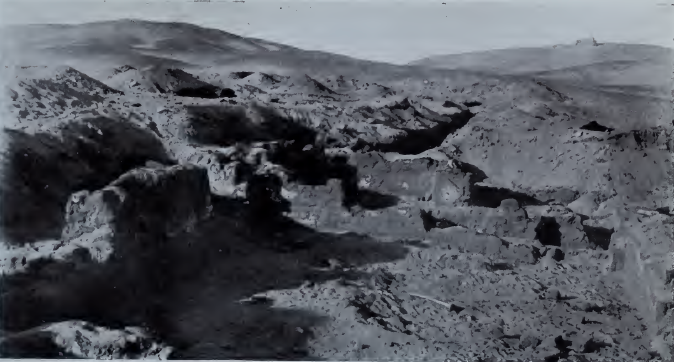
The chapel of the pyramid complex

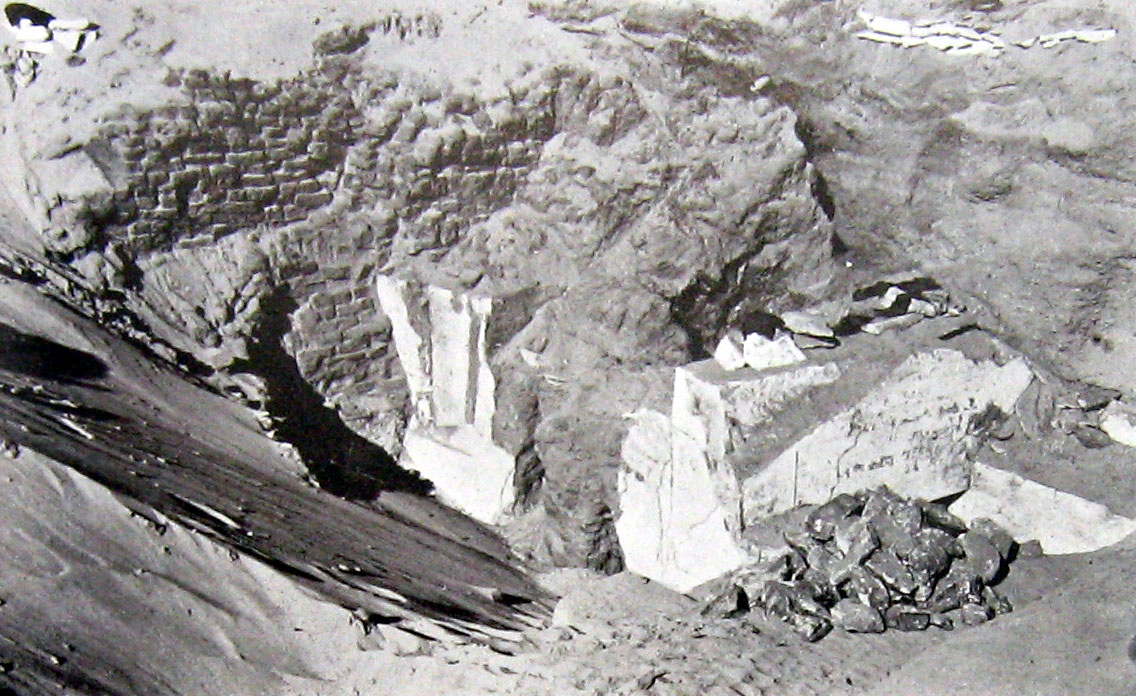
Outer limestone blocks and core mud bricks from the pyramid

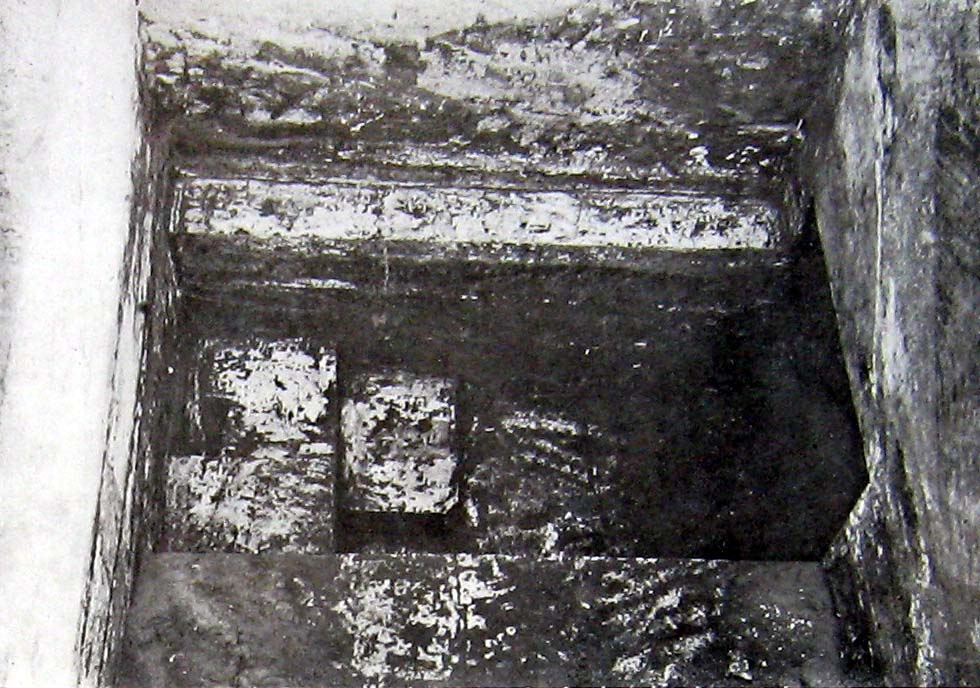
Staircase east of the antechamber

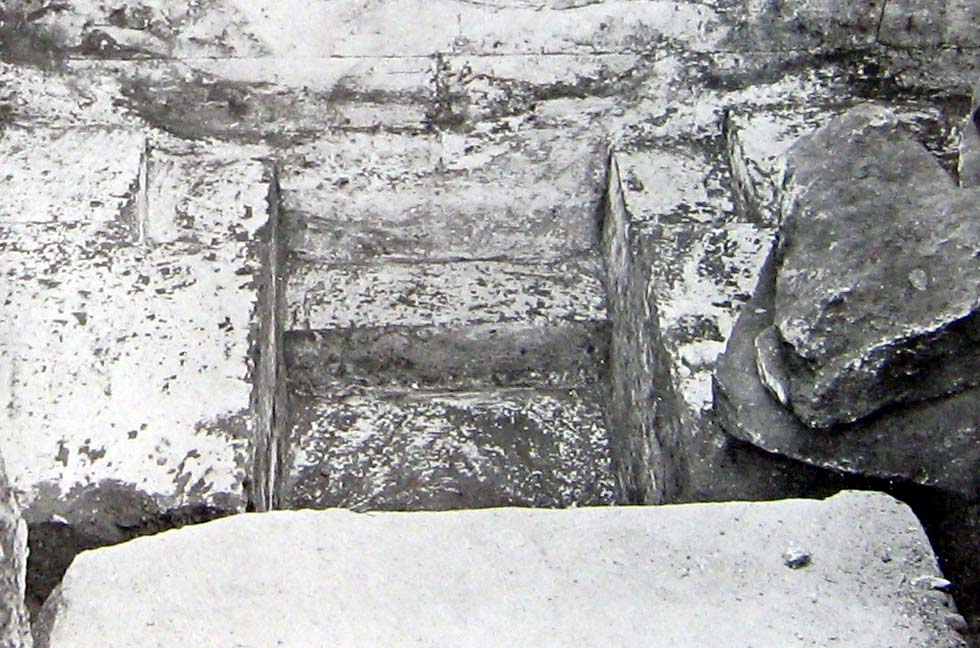
Staircase to the burial chamber

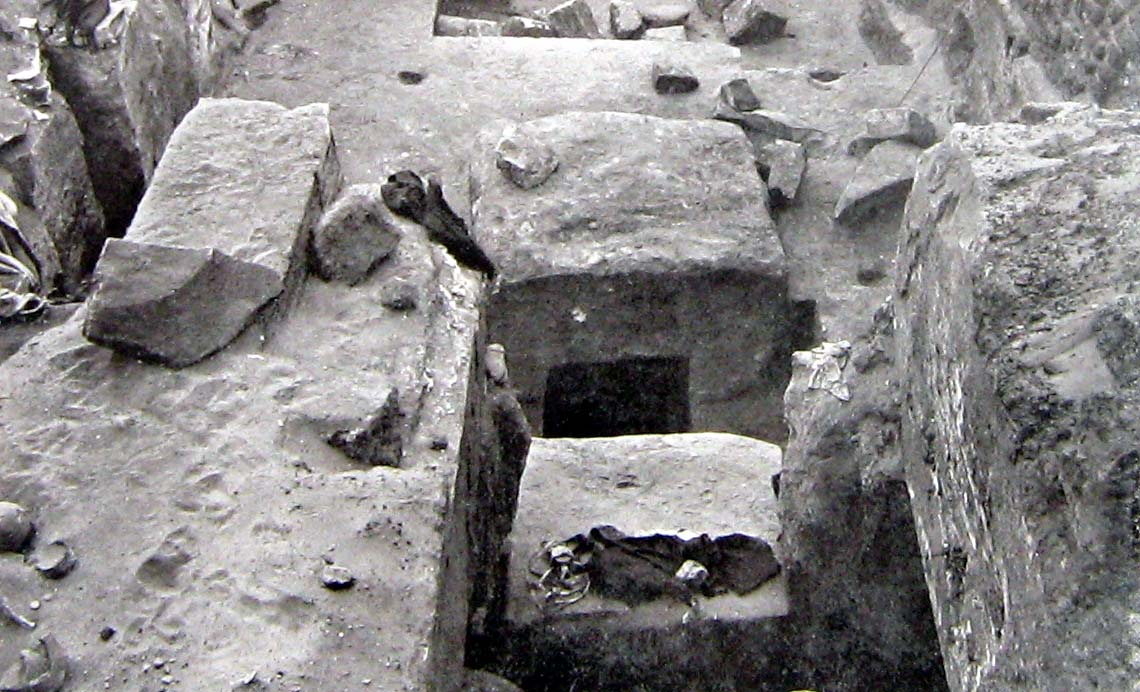
Exterior of the burial vault

== See also ==
- List of Egyptian pyramids

== Sources ==
- Mark Lehner, Das Geheimnis der Pyramiden in Ägypten. Orbis Verlag, München 1999, pp. 184–185, ISBN 3-572-01039-X.
- Rainer Stadelmann, Die ägyptischen Pyramiden. Vom Ziegelbau zum Weltwunder. Verlag Philipp von Zabern, 3. Aufl., Mainz 1997, pp. 250–251, ISBN 3-8053-1142-7
- Miroslav Verner, Die Pyramiden. Rowohlt Verlag, Reinbek 1998, pp. 472–474, ISBN 3-499-60890-1.
