= Wings of the Falcon =

1977 novel by Barbara Michaels

- First edition
- Author: Barbara Michaels
- Language: English
- Genre: Thriller Novel, Historical novel, Mystery, Romance novel
- Publisher: Dodd, Mead and Company
- Publication date: 1977
- Publication place: United States, United Kingdom
- Media type: Print (Hardcover, Paperback)
- Pages: 314
- ISBN: 0-396-07458-8
- OCLC: 3089379

Wings of the Falcon is a historical romance thriller by Barbara Michaels published in 1977.

The novel tells the story of Francesca, who becomes entangled with the mysterious Il Falcone during the Italian Revolution of 1860.

Kirkus Reviews described the book as "too sweet and bubbly perhaps, with no surprises, but full of high spirits".

== Synopsis ==
Francesca Fairbourn is the daughter of an aristocratic Italian mother and British father, who eloped and were disowned by the mother's Italian family. Francesca's mother dies in childbirth and Francesca's father dies when Francesca is 18. She is rescued by her cousin Andrea del Tarconti, who sends her to the family home at Tarconti Castle in Italy, where his twin brother Stefano and grandfather the Conte live. The year is 1860, during the Italian Risorgimento, and a local hero named Il Falcone is acting in disguise to help the peasants fight against tyrannical rulers. Francesca falls for Il Falcone and eventually uncovers his identity.

== Characters ==
- Francesca Fairbourn – protagonist and narrator
- Stefano del Tarconti – the Tarconti heir, Francesca's half-cousin and twin brother to Andrea; he limps due to a horse accident
- Alberta "Miss P" Perkins – governess who accompanies Francesca to Italy; she is actually a British spy who has come to Italy to help Il Falcone
- Miss Rhoda – Stefano and Andrea's grandmother's sister, who raised Stefano and Andrea
- Andrea del Tarconti – Stefano's dashing and impulsive twin brother
- Conte del Tarconti – grandfather of Francesca, Stefano and Andrea, the current Prince Tarconti
- Galiana Fosilini – young, spoiled daughter of Contessa Fosilini, who becomes a friend of Francesca
- Contessa Fosilini – quiet, frail, and very religious wife of the late Count Fosilini, the man whose planned marriage to Francesca's mother was prevented by the elopement
- Raoul De Merode – local captain soldier, obsessed with the desire to defeat Il Falcone
- Francesca del Tarconti – Francesca's mother, who died during Francesca's birth
- Charles Fairbourn – Francesca's handsome British father, who loves and indulges his daughter
- Teresa – Francesca's maid, who is generally helpful and brave
