= Kitab al-Kanuz =

Lost 15th-century Arabic manuscript

Kitāb al-Kanūz (Arabic: كتاب الكنوز, "Book of Treasures"), sometimes called The Book of Hidden Pearls, is a lost medieval Arabic manuscript from the 15th century. The manuscript is a hunter's guide noted for its mention of the Zerzura oasis. The author and exact dating of the manuscript are unknown.

== Content ==
The Kitāb al-Kanūz is a collection of mystical fables from around the Middle East. It lists over four hundred sites in Egypt that hold hidden treasure and details the incantations needed to ward off the evil spirits who guard said treasures. The guide provides a specific plan for obtaining the treasure without alerting the royalty, which includes retrieving the key from a unique location to access the wealth. This allows the hunter to avoid any danger or complications that may arise from encountering the King and Queen directly.

The Egyptian Gazette, an English newspaper published in Cairo, printed a purported translation of a fragment of the manuscript relating to the Sphinx of Giza in 1904. They mistranslated the name, referring to it instead as the "Kitab el Kanoor". They stated that the manuscript was highly valued among Maghrebi treasure seekers, only a few copies existed and was at least a few centuries old. The translation went as follows:

"Go to the Sphinx and measure from its face south-east twelve Maliki cubits, that is to say, each a cubit and a half of the greatest cubit. Search there and you will find two mastabas of stone and stones scattered around them. Dig between the two mastabas about a man's height, and you will find a plate (? flagstone). Clear it from sand well, and raise it and pass to the door which is the door of the Great Pyramid. Cross the threshold of the door and beware of the wells on the right and left, which are closed wells. Pass straight on and take no notice of the wells, and you will find in the breast (front) of the wall a great stone (? turning). Open it and pass on, and you will see many cells on the right and left, and before your face a great cell with the (great) king of the former kings of Egypt, and kings with him and his son, around him, wearing their kingly robes adorned with gold and silver, and you will see their treasures and their emeralds, and pearls and ornaments of gold and silver...."

== History ==
The tradition among the Ancient Egyptians of burying their dead with priceless artifacts made with out of precious gems and metals was well established and known to historians well after the age of the Pharaohs. During the Golden Age of Islam under the Abbasid caliphs raiding ancient tombs had gone from a blasphemous offense to a state sanctioned profession. A guild of licensed treasure hunters known as the Seekers arose, who were given leave to rob ancient tombs in exchange for a tax levied by the caliph in Cairo. As a secondary source of income many of these scholars began detailing their methods of raiding tombs in published manuscripts.

Similar to more modern rumors of curses and mysticism surrounding Egyptian tombs, esotericism was a well established belief among medieval Egyptians. Many Seekers employed magicians to ward of supernatural guardians and disarm mystical traps awaiting tomb raiders. These esoteric matters were recorded alongside more mundane methods of searching the tombs, and proved to be the most popular aspect of the manuscripts among readers. As the centuries passed the authors of such texts grew increasingly esoteric and enigmatic in their approach to the manuals, peppering their texts with alchemical references and cabbalistic codes (such esoteric mysticism also provided an easy scape goat for why the tomb described in the text was found empty of any valuables, describing in detail the unseen djinn or similar guardian hiding the treasure from invader until the proper rituals were ready to dispel the wards).

The Kitab al Kanuz was a late edition to this tradition, published sometime in the 15th century AD after the Seekers had long been dissolved by the Mamelukes. On the basis of the diverse style of dialects and writing styles found within the book scholars have speculated that in part or in total the manuscript is a compiled collection of texts copied from manuals centuries older. This, however, has yet to be proven, as the original Book of Hidden Pearls and the rarely intact older have not yet yielded an older version of the instructions found in the Arabic, French and English translations available to modern historians. The author of the text is not known to modern historians and was most likely left unnamed in the original 15th century manuscript (as was the common practice among the Seekers and writers of treasure manuals who followed in their footsteps).

During the 19th century the Kitab al Kanuz was apparently popular enough among the general egyptian population and foreign treasure hunters alike that the resultant tomb raids were proving destructive to the remaining antiquities and structures. With the apparent intent of put an end to this destruction Gaston Maspero (founder and at the time still acting director of the Egyptian Antiquities Service commissioned a modern publication of the book in both arabic and his native French. His stated hope was that interest in the work would subside when ease of access revealed to the public the quasi-mystical and illogical nature of the work and eliminate any credibility it might be held in. The publication had the opposite result, selling all copies in a brief period of time and leading to another decade of amateur treasure hunting and site contamination.

In 1930, E.A. Johnson Pasha (a member of the Royal Geographical Society) said that he had had the manuscript in his possession "for many years," and that he had loaned it to the Department of Antiquities around 1905. László Almásy of Hungary read the manuscript and became enchanted by its Zerzura tale, which inspired him to help British explorers make expeditions into the Sahara desert for the Zerzura oasis in the 1930s. In 1907, the Imprimerie de l'Institut francais d'archaeologie orientale published an Arabic compilation and a French translation of three different copies held at the Cairo Museum, including Johnson's copy.
