= The Crying Child =

1971 mystery novel by Barbara Mertz

- Author: Barbara Mertz
- Language: English
- Genre: Mystery
- Publisher: Dodd, Mead & Co.
- Publication date: October 1971
- Publication place: United States
- Pages: 272
- ISBN: 9780396063926
- Dewey Decimal: 813.54
- LC Class: PZ4.M577 Cr

The Crying Child is a 1971 mystery novel by Barbara Mertz, published under the pen name Barbara Michaels. It follows a woman named Joanne who arrives on an island off the coast of Maine to help comfort her sister, Mary, who has been behaving oddly after having multiple miscarriages. Mary claims to hear the sound of a child crying; eventually, Joanne begins to hear it as well.

It received generally positive reviews, and was adapted into a made-for-TV film in 1996.

== Synopsis ==
The story centers around two sisters, Joanne (referred to as Jo) and Mary. Jo receives a call from Mary's husband, Ran Fraser, who requests her to come to the small island off of the coast of Maine where they live to see if she can help Mary. Jo is single and ten years younger than Mary, who has had multiple miscarriages, which have apparently given her "a nervous breakdown", according to Ran.

Jo arrives on the East Coast residence from her home in San Francisco. Jo learns that Mary has been taking nighttime walks, alone, because she claimed to have heard the sound of a crying child. The child is eventually known as "Kevin", which is also a name listed on a tombstone on the island. The island's doctor, Will Graham, believes that Mary is suffering from delusions out of grief, and Jo initially believes him. However, she eventually begins to hear the sound herself.

== Publication history ==
The Crying Child was first published by Dodd, Mead & Co. in October 1971. It was adapted into a a television film with the same name in 1996, starring Mariel Hemingway and George DelHoyo.

Paperback and ebook editions were reissued by HarperCollins in 2007.

== Reception ==
The Crying Child received mostly positive reviews. The novel's suspense and intrigue were generally well received. A review in The Item praised its mystery and "blood-chilling" final scene. The El Dorado Times noted it for being "highly readable", but simultaneously resembling a soap opera.

Its depiction of real ghosts as the novel's true culprit met mixed reception. In a wholly negative review, Jacky Pyle of The News Tribune described it as "[a] bowl full of goo", "lousy", and "a bummer", criticizing its characters and plot.
