= Guardian of the Horizon =

2004 novel by Elizabeth Peters

- First edition cover for Guardian of the Horizon
- Author: Elizabeth Peters
- Language: English
- Series: Amelia Peabody series mysteries
- Genre: Historical mystery
- Publisher: William Morrow
- Publication date: 2004
- Publication place: United States
- Media type: Print (paperback)
- Pages: 399
- ISBN: 0-06-621471-8
- OCLC: 53977533
- Dewey Decimal: 813/.54 22
- LC Class: PS3563.E747 G83 2004
- Preceded by: The Ape Who Guards the Balance
- Followed by: A River in the Sky

Guardian of the Horizon is one of a series of historical mystery novels, written by Elizabeth Peters and published in 2004. It features fictional sleuth and archaeologist Amelia Peabody. The story is set in the 1907–1908 dig season in Egypt. This places it chronologically between the 10th and 11th novels, although it is 16th in order of publication.

== Setting ==
=== Chronological ===
This novel is set in the dig season of 1907–1908. It immediately follows The Ape Who Guards the Balance set in 1906–1907. However, it was published some years later than the books that follow it chronologically.

=== Geographical ===
Most of the events of the novel are set in a fictitious mountainous oasis in the Sahara Desert of Nubia, which is inhabited by a culture preserving traditions from the ancient Egyptian and Meroitic civilizations. The physical details of the oasis are based on the oases of Jebel Uweinat (Ouanet) and Jebel Arkenu (Arkenet), discovered by the Egyptian statesman and explorer Ahmed Hassanein.

== Plot summary ==
The story begins in August 1907, ten years after the Emersons' expedition into the Nubian desert in The Last Camel Died at Noon. On that occasion, they had responded to a request from a mysterious man called Tarek, who had travelled to England to ask them to rescue Mr Forth, a former acquaintance of Professor Emerson. Their travels had taken them to a Lost Oasis in the Western Desert of Nubia, where a Meroitic – ancient Egyptian civilization had survived for centuries without outside contact outside. There they had learned that Forth was dead, and that Forth's daughter Nefret was being groomed as High Priestess of Isis. The Emersons had fought to help Tarek claim his ancestral throne, and at the end of the novel had brought Nefret to live with them in England, as her father had wished.

At the beginning of Guardian of the Horizon, a messenger from the Lost Oasis appears at their home in Kent, pleading for help for their friend, King Tarek. They go to his aid, though they mistrust the messenger, who claims to be Tarek's younger half-brother. Ramses experiences the feeling of foreboding that normally assails Amelia, as they head off to the Sudan and into the desert to help their friend. Unlike their first trip, they bring a larger force, including Selim and Daoud, in full awareness that the Lost Oasis is no longer a secret. The Emersons are not the only ones interested in it, and their current journey there is dogged by followers. These include a British army captain (Moroney), an archaeologist (MacFerguson) and an adventurer (Newbold), who has in his company a young woman, Daria. Daria attempts to seduce Ramses, but although attracted to her, he resists her. He is really in love with Nefret, as he discussed with David before this trip was planned.

Upon their arrival, they find that King Tarek has been deposed by Zekare, the father of the duplicitous Merasen who brought them back. Zekare's plan is to obtain the endorsement of the Emerson family to neutralise the popular resistance to his regime. Nefret is abducted (along with Daria) and made to resume her position as high priestess, which she finds distasteful now. They notice changes, as there is now coffee to drink, paper on which to write, and hardened steel knives and swords. There is clearly a supplier importing these goods. This brings Sethos to their minds. When Amelia catches an intruder in their quarters, she is relieved to find that it is her enemy and admirer Sethos, disguised as the archaeologist MacFerguson; she persuades him to rescue Nefret.

A usual rite honoring Isis is the setting chosen by the usurper to assure his hold on the throne. A few days before that, Ramses escapes the family quarters. He makes contact with supporters of Tarek in the village of the rekkit (an oppressed servant class), then is guided to contact with Tarek's soldiers. He returns to the temple, where he hopes to rescue Nefret from her guards; because she is too well-guarded, he instead takes Daria. The two hide during the day in an abandoned house, make love, and then sleep, before making their way to Tarek the following evening. Tarek plans to attack on that ritual day, his in-town supporters will rise up. The Emersons feel that the change can be accomplished without an uprising, a possible civil war, by a different approach. Tarek listens. One aspect of the different approach is getting Nefret away from the ritual, and Sethos gets her out when he is disguised as a priest, bringing her to the Emerson family quarters.

Emerson is active in these schemes, as he is seen as a god-like figure in this culture. He speaks to the public and negotiates with the usurper. Amelia comes up with new plans as events change rapidly. Selim and Daoud aid directly, and make friends with the servant class easily.

Leaving Tarek, descending a steep slope, Ramses is wounded, falls a long way down, and is imprisoned by the gleeful Merasen. Ramses shares his cell with Moroney, former English army captain who had originally saved Merasen from slavers on his outward journey from the oasis. Moroney had realised Merasen's origins and agreed to go into partnership with him in exchange for expected wealth from the oasis, accompanying him to England to meet the Emersons before meeting him secretly on the return journey and reading the map which Merasen had stolen from Nefret. After returning to the oasis, Merasen had imprisoned Moroney when he became politically inconvenient. Merasen brings Amelia to tend her son's wounds in prison, and she smuggles a pair of scissors to him as a weapon. Ramses immediately escapes the prison with the aid of Ameneslo, an ally of Tarek sent by his mother, and the weapons, and they both escape. Ramses joins his family.

On the day, Emerson addresses those gathered outside City of the Holy Mountain, dramatically pulling out an arrow that hit his chest; in fact it hit the makeshift armored vest he and Amelia devised. Amelia and Nefret, dressed in their working clothes and not the gowns given them, appear at the temple. To their surprise, the throne is not occupied by Zekare but by Merasen, who tells them his father has been killed by Merasen's brothers, who have now been executed for their crimes. People are assembled for the ritual; Ramses enters as the advance guard for Tarek. Ramses and Merasen fight a duel with the new swords. Ramses defeats and disarms Merasen, but refuses to despatch him. Merasen grabs the knife while Ramses' attention is elsewhere and makes a last move to kill him. Merasen fails, as he is killed by a bullet to the chest fired by Daoud.

Emerson and Tarek enter the scene. Tarek is again the king and the people are satisfied. He will take Daria as his wife, and she hopes to provide him with sons.

Sethos, still as MacFerguson, got a broken leg in the melee in the temple. Amelia tends to him and keeps Emerson from seeing him. Sethos tells her that he had been coming to the City of the Holy Mountain for eight years, and has a few precious items from the place. He explains that Daria is his agent, who followed Amelia on this trip.

Tarek arranges an odd meeting of Ramses with Nefret in her father's tomb. Nefret is in a trance state, and repeats conversations she had with her father when he was alive. She promises him she will remain a maiden, not marry. Tarek knows that she could never marry him. Both Tarek and an old woman from the village make clear that Nefret will belong to Ramses. Thus far, Nefret sees him only as her brother, so this is challenging for 20-year-old Ramses to believe.

The Emersons with Selim and Daoud trek back to the oasis, on camels, having survived the summer trip in the desert.

== Reviews ==
Publishers Weekly found this novel, where the Emersons return to the Lost Oasis featured in The Last Camel Died at Noon ten years later, to be a good addition to the series. The overall judgment was that "Peters's knowledge of ancient Egypt ... in the region allow her to dress her melodrama with authentic trappings that add greatly to the enjoyment."

Audio File magazine reviewed the audio book, narrated by Barbara Rosenblat. They praised her for her excellent work in conveying the story, noting that it won an Earphones Award. In a brief remark about the novel, their comment was "Kidnapping, murder, political intrigues, and damsels in distress make this sixteenth episode in the Peabody Chronicles every bit as exciting as the others."

== See also ==
- List of characters in the Amelia Peabody series
