= Iron Steel =

- Origin: Atlanta, Georgia, United States
- Genres: Heavy metal, Hard rock
- Years active: 2008-present
- Members: Fran Strine; Tommy Redd; Jim LaMarca; David Ellefson; Morgan Rose

Iron Steel is an American heavy metal supergroup from Atlanta, Georgia. The band was formed on the No Fear Music tour by "Fran Strine" when he was bored one day and wanted to make song. Their current line-up consists of five members: Fran Strine (vocals), Tommy Redd (guitar), Jim LaMarca (guitar), David Ellefson (bass) and Morgan Rose (drums). Backing vocals Cleve Willis and Zachary Strine. To date Iron Steel has released EP album titled Devil May Care. It is a hit on college and metal radio. The band has debuted at No. 35 with a bullet on the FMQB charts, No. 3 Most Added at FMQB and No. 6 Most Added at CMJ Loud Rock.

== Debut album ==
They are now in the process of recording their full-length album. The album is scheduled to have special guest appearances from a number of people on the album, including Herman Li (DragonForce), Vadim Pruzhanov (DragonForce), Aaron Lewis (Staind), and Mike Mushok (Staind). On the album will be the songs from the EP, a few covers, and new original songs. It is not known when it will be released.

The band recently added a new song titled "Saints of Sin" and a cover of the Judas Priest track Rapid Fire on their MySpace page.

== Band members ==
- Fran Strine – Vocals
- Tommy Redd – Guitar
- Jim LaMarca – Guitar
- Morgan Rose – Drums

Former

- David Ellefson – Bass

== Discography ==
- 2008: Devil May Care (EP)
