= Devil May Care (Peters novel) =

1977 novel by Elizabeth Peters

- First edition
- Author: Elizabeth Peters
- Language: English
- Genre: Romantic suspense
- Publisher: Dodd, Mead & Co.
- Publication date: 1977
- Publication place: United States
- Media type: Print (paperback)

Devil-May-Care (spelled Devil May Care in later editions) is a novel of romantic suspense published by Elizabeth Peters in 1977. It has been re-released several times and recorded on audio CD by Grace Conlen.

It is the sixth of nine "stand alone" books written by prolific author Barbara Mertz under the Elizabeth Peters pseudonym. (The vast majority of novels written under the Barbara Michaels pseudonym are stand alones.) According to WorldCat, the book is held in 919 libraries.

== Plot ==
Young, beautiful Ellie is to house-sit for her wealthy and eccentric Aunt Kate, who lives in one of the oldest towns in Virginia, founded in the 17th century by six families from England. Aunt Kate has a plethora of dogs and cats, and even a rat, that Ellie must care for, but once Aunt Kate leaves ghostly manifestations begin to occur. Is someone trying to drive Ellie out of the house, or has her arrival stirred up emotions and old enmities that had been long forgotten? Descendants of the six founding families quarrel and interfere as Ellie and a neighbor, Donald Gold, attempt to sort out what is fakery, what is malice, and what might be supernatural.
