= Harriet Klausner =

American amateur book reviewer

- Born: May 20, 1952
- Died: October 15, 2015 (aged 63)
- Occupation: Newspaper columnist
- Known for: Top ranked book reviewer on Amazon.com

Harriet Klausner (May 20, 1952 – October 15, 2015) was an amateur reviewer of books and a newspaper columnist. She was the #1 ranked reviewer on Amazon.com for many years, and at the time of her death held the No. 1 spot in Amazon's reviewer "Hall of Fame".

== Biography ==
Klausner grew up in the Bronx and her father was an employee of McGraw-Hill. Klausner was a former librarian with a master's degree in library science, who was proficient in speed-reading. Reportedly, "ailments (kept) her home and insomnia (kept) her up". She resided in Atlanta.

Klausner professed in her online profiles to read two books a day, but a 2007 profile of her in Time reported that she read four to six books per day. This article named Klausner in its top 15 list of the "web generation's movers and shakers". In an interview published in The Wall Street Journal in 2005, she stated that her goal for reviewing was to bring attention to "lesser-known" authors who "don't have a publicity machine behind them. That's the whole purpose of my doing this on Amazon". She read mostly romance, thrillers and science fiction.

== Work ==
By the time of her death, Klausner had reviewed 31,014 books, most on Amazon. As well as posting many reviews on the Amazon website, Klausner also posted reviews on several other websites, including Barnes & Noble; Books 'n' Bytes; SFF Net; on-line magazine Of Ages Past; and SF Site.

She was the #1 "top reviewer" on Amazon.com until October 24, 2008, when the company began a new ranking system, placing another reviewer in the top spot. At the time of her death in 2015, Klausner was ranked No. 2,447. Amazon kept her at No. 1 in its reviewer "Hall of Fame", a symbolic nod to her contributions.

== Criticism ==
Klausner was criticized by those who questioned whether she actually read the books she reviewed, given the time taken to read a book and the number of reviews Klausner published per day. Additionally, every book she read was given a 4 or 5 star review. Sarah Kaplan said "Her unrelenting positivity made her reviews utterly uninformative." Stanley, her husband, said: "She's soft, I won't deny that." Some wondered if she was being paid for the reviews, and others wondered if she was even a real person.

In 2007, a group of reviewers who were critical of Klausner set up the cynically named "Harriet Klausner Appreciation Society", an online forum to monitor her reviews. They encouraged mocking responses to her reviews and offered cash rewards to anyone who could best mimic her style of reviewing.

Author John Birmingham deliberately included a character called Harriet Klausner in his novel Designated Targets. It was noted that Klausner made no mention of this in her review, casting doubt on whether she had fully read the book.

To her critics, Klausner said only "Get a life", in a 2012 New York Times interview. "Read a book."

== Legacy ==
Alastair Reynolds's Revelation Space novels include references to a "Klausner index" as a measure of how fast one can read.
