= Barbara Mertz =

American novelist (1927–2013)

- Born: Barbara Louise Gross; September 29, 1927; Canton, Illinois
- Died: August 8, 2013 (aged 85); Frederick, Maryland
- Occupation: Author
- Spouse: Richard Mertz (m. 1950; div. 1969)
- Children: Peter, Elizabeth
- Writing career
- Pen name: Barbara Michaels, Elizabeth Peters
- Period: 1964–2013
- Genres: Suspense, Mystery, Thriller, academic Egyptology

Barbara Louise Mertz (September 29, 1927 – August 8, 2013), known professionally as Elizabeth Peters and as Barbara Michaels, was an American author. In 1952, she received a PhD in Egyptology from the University of Chicago. She was best known for her mystery and suspense novels, including the Amelia Peabody book series.

In the 1960s, Mertz authored two books on ancient Egypt: Temples, Tombs, and Hieroglyphs, a popular history of ancient Egypt; and Red Land, Black Land, which explores daily life in ancient Egypt. Both have remained in print ever since, and revised editions were released in 2007 and 2008, respectively.

== Biography ==
Barbara Mertz was born on September 29, 1927, in Canton, Illinois. She graduated from the University of Chicago with a bachelor's degree in 1947, a master's degree in 1950, and a PhD in Egyptology in 1952, having studied with John A. Wilson. She authored two books on ancient Egypt, Temples, Tombs, and Hieroglyphs (1964; rev. ed. 2007) and Red Land, Black Land (1966; rev. ed. 2008) (both of which have been continuously in print since first publication), but primarily wrote mystery and suspense novels. She became a published writer in 1964. She was married to Richard Mertz for 19 years (1950–1969); the marriage ended in divorce. They had two children, Peter and Elizabeth Mertz.

Under the name Barbara Michaels, she wrote primarily gothic and supernatural thrillers. Her publisher chose that pseudonym since Mertz had already published one non-fiction book on ancient Egypt, and the publisher did not want Mertz's novels to be confused with her academic work. Under the pseudonym Elizabeth Peters, Mertz published mysteries, including her Amelia Peabody historical mystery series, using a nom de plume drawn from the names of her two children.

She was member of the Editorial Advisory Board of KMT, ("A Modern Journal of Ancient Egypt"), Egypt Exploration Society, and the James Henry Breasted Circle of the University of Chicago Oriental Institute.

Mertz was also a feminist, a topic that frequently arose in her fiction, and in her professional life. Mertz founded "Malice Domestic", a Washington-based organization for women mystery writers, "because she thought men were getting all the prizes." She also started a scholarship for women writers at Hood College.

Mertz died at her home in Maryland on August 8, 2013. Her papers are held at the Lilly Library, at Indiana University in Bloomington, Indiana.

== Awards ==
Mertz received a number of award wins and nominations from the mystery community. Her first recognition came when Trojan Gold was nominated for the 1988 Anthony Award in the "Best Novel" category; the following year, Naked Once More won the 1989 Agatha Award in the same category. Following this Mertz earned a series of Agatha Award "Best Novel" nominations, including The Last Camel Died at Noon in 1991; The Snake, the Crocodile, and the Dog in 1992; Night Train to Memphis in 1994; Seeing a Large Cat in 1997; The Ape Who Guards the Balance in 1998; and He Shall Thunder in the Sky in 2000 which also received an Anthony Award "Best Novel" nomination in 2001. Mertz received a final Agatha Award nomination for "Best Novel" in 2002 for The Golden One and won the "Best Non-fiction Work" the following year for Amelia Peabody's Egypt: A Compendium, which also received an Edgar Award nomination in 2004 in the "Best Critical / Biographical Work" category.

Mertz was also the recipient of a number of grandmaster and lifetime achievement awards, including being named Grandmaster at the Anthony Awards in 1986 and Grandmaster by the Mystery Writers of America in 1998; in 2003, she received a Lifetime Achievement Award at the Malice Domestic Convention. In 2012 she was honored with the first Amelia Peabody Award at the Malice Domestic Convention; the award was named after the leading character in her long-running series.

== Published works ==
=== Fiction written as Elizabeth Peters ===
==== Amelia Peabody ====
This series contains 20 books; the most recent and last, The Painted Queen, was published in July 2017 after being completed by Joan Hess. The heroine and her husband Radcliffe Emerson are Egyptologists, while their only biological son Walter (always known as Ramses) is a specialist in ancient Near Eastern languages. In addition to Ramses, the family includes two other members whom Amelia regards as her children: Nefret Forth (3 years older than Ramses) and Sennia (ca. 25 years younger). The stories all relate to the "Golden Age" of Egyptology and nearly all are set in Egypt, with the excavations providing the backdrop for the mystery/adventure plots.

The timeline begins in the 1880s with Amelia's decision to see the world as an unexpectedly wealthy feminist spinster, and ends with the discovery of Tutankhamun's tomb in late 1922. (Peters had planned additional books in the series to "fill in the blanks" in the chronology, as she did with River: set in 1910, though it was written after other books that are set later.)

1. Crocodile on the Sandbank. 1975. Covers the 1884–85 Season.
2. The Curse of the Pharaohs. 1981. Covers the 1892–93 season.
3. The Mummy Case. 1985. Covers the 1894–95 season.
4. Lion in the Valley. 1986. Covers the 1895–96 season.
5. The Deeds of the Disturber. 1988. Covers Summer 1896.
6. The Last Camel Died at Noon. 1991. Covers the 1897–98 season.
7. The Snake, the Crocodile, and the Dog. 1992. Covers the 1898–99 season.
8. The Hippopotamus Pool. 1996. Covers the 1899–1900 season.
9. Seeing a Large Cat. 1997. Covers the 1903–04 season.
10. The Ape Who Guards the Balance. 1998. Covers the 1906–07 season.
11. The Falcon at the Portal. 1999. Covers the 1911–12 season.
12. He Shall Thunder in the Sky. 2000. Covers the 1914–15 season.
13. Lord of the Silent. 2001. Covers the 1915–16 season.
14. The Golden One. 2002. Covers the 1916–17 season.
15. Children of the Storm. April 2003. Covers the 1919–20 season.
16. Guardian of the Horizon. March 2004. Covers the 1907–08 season.
17. The Serpent on the Crown. March 2005. Covers the 1922 season
18. Tomb of the Golden Bird. March 2006. Covers the 1922–23 season.
19. A River in the Sky. April 2010. Covers the 1909–1910 season in Palestine.
20. The Painted Queen. July 2017. Covers the 1912–1913 season; manuscript completed by Joan Hess following Mertz' death

Additionally: Amelia Peabody's Egypt: A Compendium – (with Kristen Whitbread) Published October 2003

==== Vicky Bliss ====
The Vicky Bliss novels follow the adventures of an American professor of art history, who keeps getting involved in international crime, and her love interest, a charming art thief known as Sir John Smythe. Another Peters novel, The Camelot Caper (1969) (also published as Her Cousin John), while not technically a Vicky Bliss story, features Smythe. The novels can be enjoyed in any order, but the stories are highly sequential in nature and are probably better appreciated if read in order of publication.

1. The Camelot Caper (1969) (alternate title: Her Cousin John)
2. Borrower of the Night (1973)
3. Street of the Five Moons (1978)
4. Silhouette in Scarlet (1983)
5. Trojan Gold (1987)
6. Night Train to Memphis (1994)
7. The Laughter of Dead Kings (2008)

This series and the Amelia Peabody series are slightly related: a fictional tomb discovered by Amelia Peabody and her husband plays an important role in Night Train to Memphis, and in The Laughter of Dead Kings it is revealed that John Smythe is related to the Emersons.

==== Jacqueline Kirby ====
In this series, Jacqueline Kirby is a middle-aged librarian with a very large purse and a knack for solving mysteries. Initially an unwilling detective, and not the apparent protagonist, in the first book (The Seventh Sinner), Kirby's quirkiness and middle-aged romantic success generated a following and led to sequels. The series continued with The Murders of Richard III and Die For Love, each of which featured Jacqueline Kirby plumbing a mystery arising out of a subculture (Ricardians and romance novelists). In Die for Love, Kirby began writing a romance novel, and in Naked Once More, the fourth and final book of the series, has proven to be quite successful in that career. In Naked Once More, Jacqueline is commissioned to write a sequel to a "famous" prehistoric romance novel, whose author died under mysterious circumstances. In each of the books, Kirby solves a mystery, attracts one or more suitors, but remains alluringly aloof and independent.

1. The Seventh Sinner (1972)
2. The Murders of Richard III (1974)
3. Die for Love (1984)
4. Naked Once More (1989)

==== Other fiction ====
- The Jackal's Head (1968)
- The Camelot Caper (1969)
- The Dead Sea Cipher (1970)
- The Night of Four Hundred Rabbits (1971)
- Legend in Green Velvet (1976)
- Devil-May-Care (1977)
- Summer of the Dragon (1979)
- The Love Talker (1980)
- The Copenhagen Connection (1982)

=== Fiction written as Barbara Michaels ===
==== Georgetown trilogy ====
1. Ammie Come Home (1968) – Adapted and made into the made-for TV movie, The House That Would Not Die, starring Barbara Stanwyck and Richard Egan.
2. Shattered Silk (1986)
3. Stitches in Time (1995)

==== Someone in the House duology ====
1. Black Rainbow (1982)
2. Someone in the House (1981)

==== Stand-alone novels ====
- The Master of Blacktower (1966)
- Sons of the Wolf (1967) (alternate title: Mystery on the Moors)
- Prince of Darkness (1969)
- The Dark on the Other Side (1970)
- The Crying Child (1971) – Adapted into a film of the same name starring Mariel Hemingway in 1996
- Greygallows (1972)
- Witch (1973)
- House of Many Shadows (1974)
- The Sea King's Daughter (1975)
- Patriot's Dream (1976)
- Wings of the Falcon (1977)
- Wait for What Will Come (1978)
- The Walker in Shadows (1979)
- The Wizard's Daughter (1980)
- Here I Stay (1983)
- The Grey Beginning (1984)
- Be Buried in the Rain (1985)
- Search the Shadows (1987)
- Smoke and Mirrors (1989)
- "The Runaway" (ss) Sisters in Crime, ed. Marilyn Wallace, (1989)
- Into the Darkness (1990)
- Vanish with the Rose (1992)
- Houses of Stone (1993)
- The Dancing Floor (1997)
- Other Worlds (1999)

=== Nonfiction books ===
- Temples, Tombs, and Hieroglyphs (1964; rev. ed. 2007)
- Red Land, Black Land (1966; rev. ed. 2008)
- Two Thousand Years in Rome (with Richard Mertz) (1968)
