= Prehistoric Central Africa =

Prehistory of the Central African subregion of the African continent

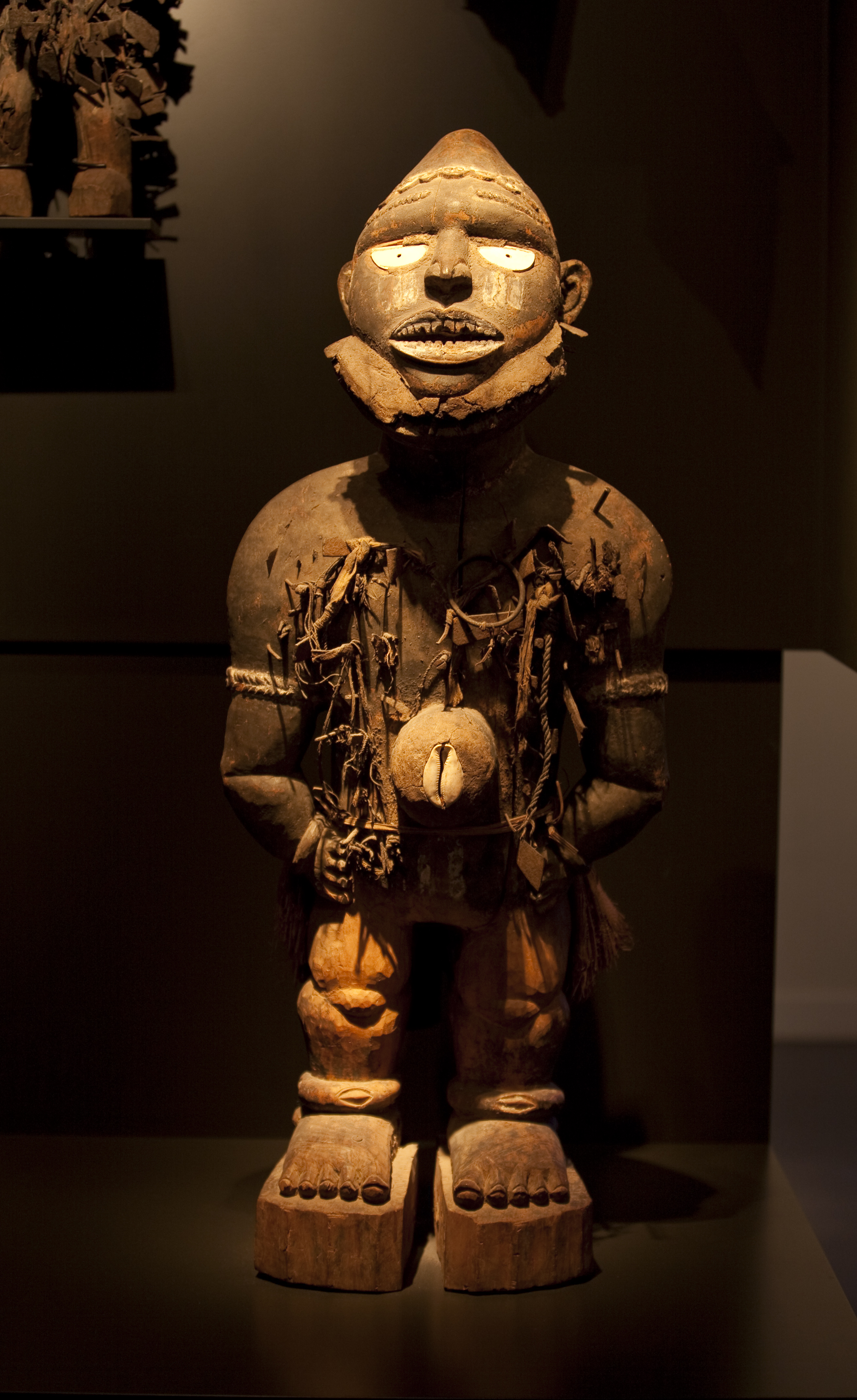
Mangaaka Power Figure (Nkisi N'Kondi), Kongo artist and Nganga, Yombe group, Second half of the 19th century

The prehistory of Central Africa spans from the earliest human presence in the region until the emergence of the Iron Age in Central Africa. By at least 2,000,000 BP, Central Africa (e.g., Ishango, Democratic Republic of Congo) was occupied by early hominins. West African hunter-gatherers occupied western Central Africa (e.g., Shum Laka) earlier than 32,000 BP, dwelled throughout coastal West Africa by 12,000 BP, and migrated northward between 12,000 BP and 8000 BP as far as Mali, Burkina Faso, and Mauritania. Prehistoric West Africans may have diverged into distinct ancestral groups of modern West Africans and Bantu-speaking peoples in Cameroon, and, subsequently, around 5000 BP, the Bantu-speaking peoples migrated into other parts of Sub-Saharan Africa (e.g., Central African Republic, African Great Lakes, South Africa).

== Early Stone Age ==
By at least 2,000,000 BP, Central Africa (e.g., Ishango, Democratic Republic of Congo) was occupied by early hominins.

== Middle Stone Age ==
In 150,000 BP, Africans (e.g., Central Africans, East Africans) bearing haplogroup L1 diverged.

In 90,000 BP, the oldest fishing-related bone tools (e.g., barbed harpoons) of Africa were developed in Central Africa, particularly, Katanda, Central African Republic.

Between 75,000 BP and 60,000 BP, Africans bearing haplogroup L3 emerged in East Africa and eventually migrated into and became present in modern West Africans, Central Africans, and non-Africans.

== Later Stone Age ==
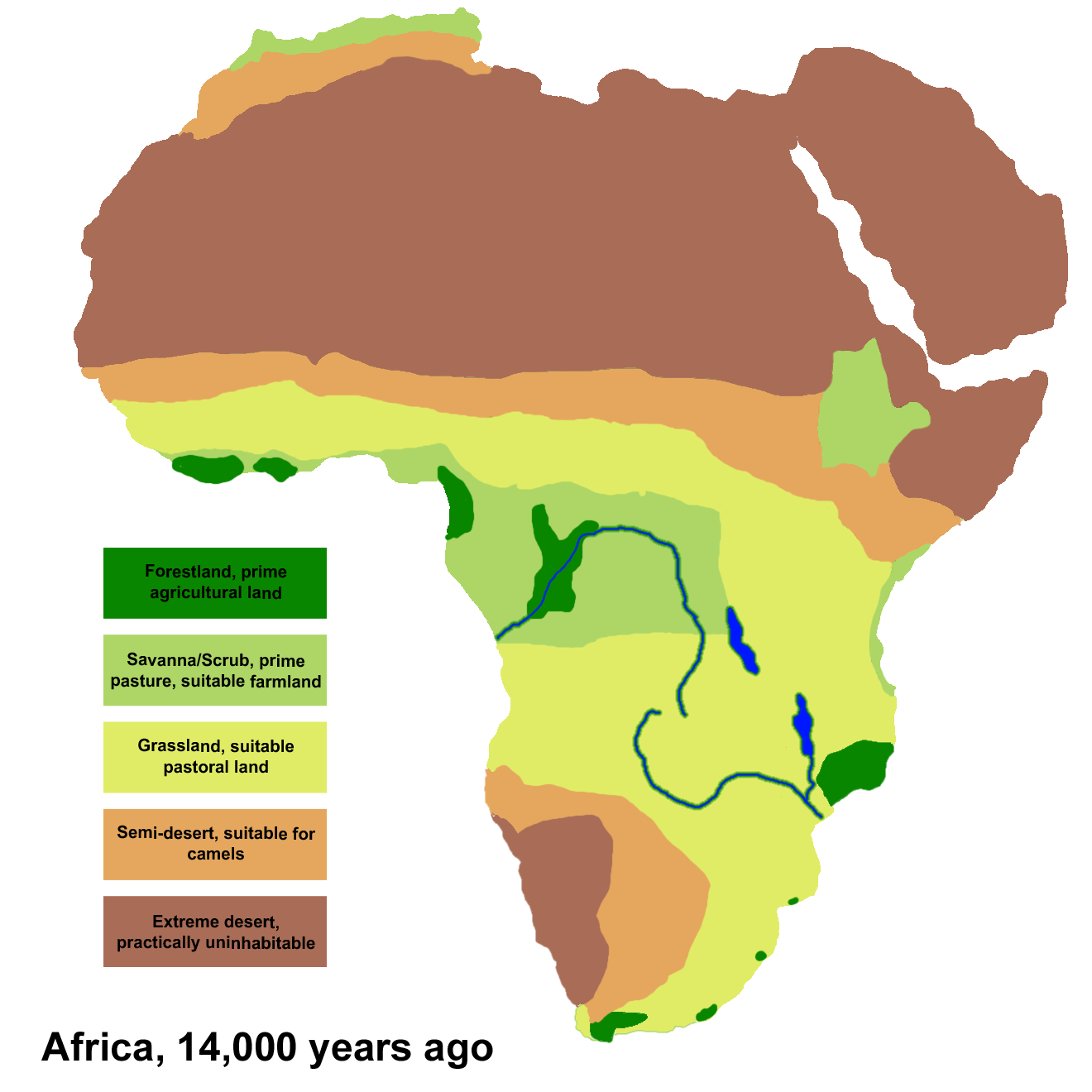
Africa in 12,000 BCE

Earlier than 32,000 BP, or by 30,000 BP, Late Stone Age West African hunter-gatherers were dwelling in the forests of western Central Africa (e.g., earlier than 32,000 BP at de Maret in Shum Laka, 12,000 BP at Mbi Crater). An excessively dry Ogolian period occurred, spanning from 20,000 BP to 12,000 BP. By 15,000 BP, the number of settlements made by Middle Stone Age West Africans decreased as there was an increase in humid conditions, expansion of the West African forest, and increase in the number of settlements made by Late Stone Age West African hunter-gatherers. Macrolith-using late Middle Stone Age peoples (e.g., the possibly archaic human admixed or late-persisting early modern human Iwo Eleru fossils of the late Middle Stone Age), who dwelled in Central Africa, to western Central Africa, to West Africa, were displaced by microlith-using Late Stone Age Africans (e.g., non-archaic human admixed Late Stone Age Shum Laka fossils dated between 7000 BP and 3000 BP) as they migrated from Central Africa, to western Central Africa, into West Africa. Between 16,000 BP and 12,000 BP, Late Stone Age West Africans began dwelling in the eastern and central forested regions (e.g., Ghana, Ivory Coast, Nigeria; between 18,000 BP and 13,000 BP at Temet West and Asokrochona in the southern region of Ghana, 13,050 ± 230 BP at Bingerville in the southern region of Ivory Coast, 11,200 ± 200 BP at Iwo Eleru in Nigeria) of West Africa. By 11,000 BP, the late settlement made by Middle Stone Age West Africans and earliest settlement made by Late Stone Age West African hunter-gatherers emerged in the westernmost region (e.g., Falémé Valley, Senegal) of West Africa. Middle Stone Age West Africans and Late Stone Age West African hunter-gatherers likely did not become admixed with one another and were culturally and ecologically distinct from one another.

Between 25,000 BP and 20,000 BP, hunter-fisher-gatherer peoples in Central Africa (e.g., Ishango, Democratic Republic of Congo) used fishing tools and natural resources from nearby water sources, as well as may have engaged in and recorded mathematics (e.g., Ishango bone, which may demonstrate knowledge and use of the duodecimal system, prime numbers, multiplication).

In 19,000 BP, Africans, bearing haplogroup E1b1a-V38, likely traversed across the Sahara, from east to west.

According to Steverding (2020), Near the African Great Lakes, schistosomes (e.g., S. mansoni, S. haematobium) underwent evolution. Subsequently, there was an expansion alongside the Nile River. From Egypt, the presence of schistosomes expanded into Western Africa and then subsequently to Central and Southern Africa. Whether this was specifically due to the migration of Yoruba people, into Western Africa as well as the migratory Bantu-speaking peoples, into the rest of Sub-Saharan Africa (e.g., Southern Africa, Central Africa) is uncertain.

Niger-Congo migration may have been from Kordofan, Sudan into West Africa or West Africa into Kordofan. Possibly from Kordofan, Niger-Congo speakers (e.g., Mande), accompanied by undomesticated helmeted guineafowls, may have traversed into West Africa, domesticated the helmeted guineafowls by 3000 BCE, and via the Bantu expansion, traversed into other parts of Sub-Saharan Africa (e.g., Central Africa, East Africa, Southern Africa).

Amid the Holocene, including the Holocene Climate Optimum in 8000 BP, Africans bearing haplogroup L2 spread within West Africa and Africans bearing haplogroup L3 spread within East Africa. As the largest migration since the Out of Africa migration, migration from Sub-Saharan Africa toward the North Africa occurred, by West Africans, Central Africans, and East Africans, resulting in migrations into Europe and Asia; consequently, Sub-Saharan African mitochondrial DNA was introduced into Europe and Asia.

West African hunter-gatherers, in the region of western Central Africa (e.g., Shum Laka, Cameroon), particularly between 8000 BP and 3000 BP, were found to be related to modern Central African hunter-gatherers (e.g., Baka, Bakola, Biaka, Bedzan).

== Pastoral Neolithic ==
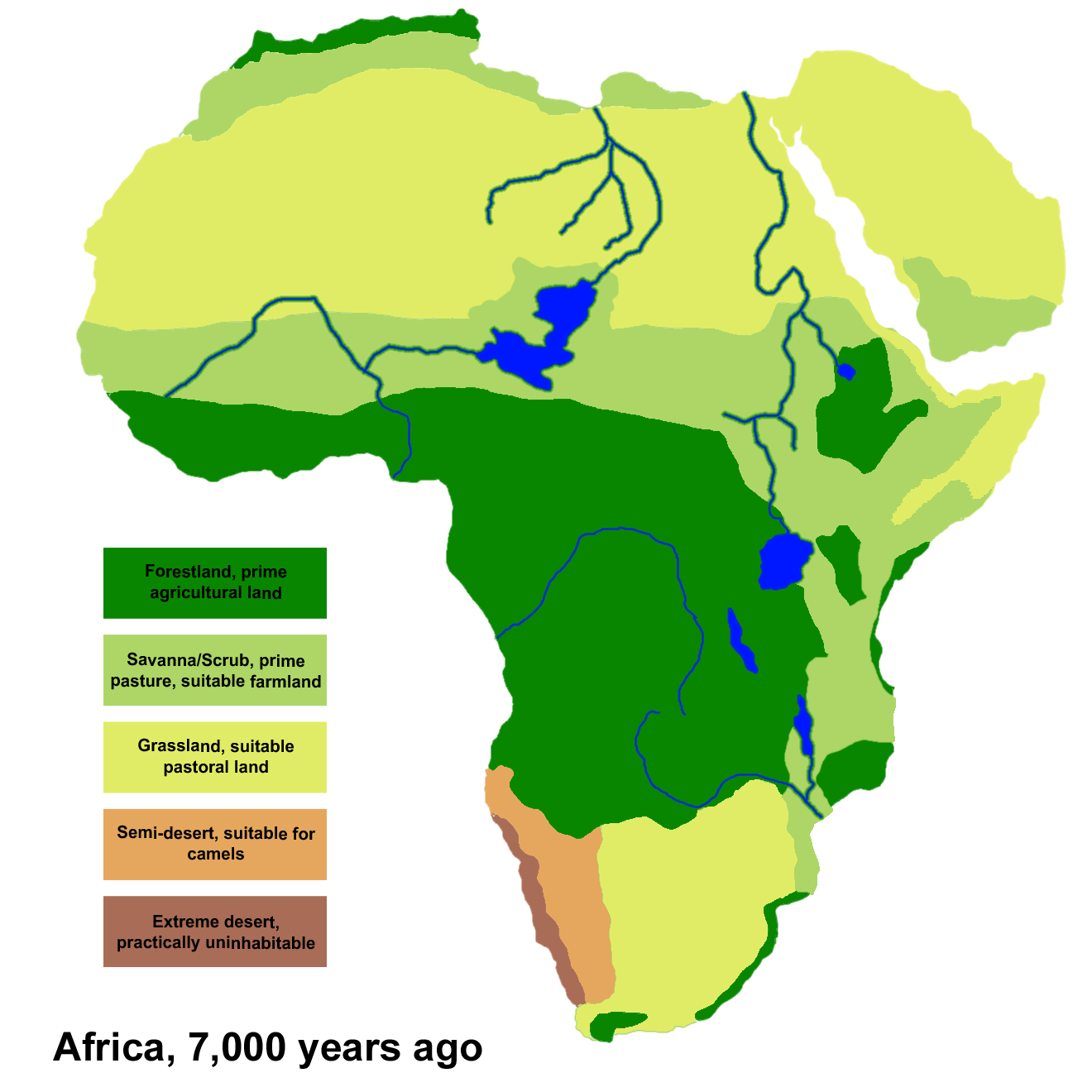
Africa in 5000 BCE

After the Bubaline Period, Kel Essuf Period, and Round Head Period of the Central Sahara, the Pastoral Period followed. As cattle pastoralism had endured in the Sahara since 7500 BP, Central Saharan hunters and herders may have lived together in a common area for a long period of time. Desertification may have resulted in migrations from the Central Saharan region, where the Round Head paintings are located, toward Lake Chad and the Niger Delta. While some migrated south of the Sahara, other Central Saharan hunter-gatherers may have taken on the custom of pastoralism (e.g., herding domesticated cattle and goats). Given the opportunity to become socially distinguished, to develop food surplus, as well as to acquire and aggregate wealth, this led to the adoption of a domestic cattle pastoral economy by some Central Saharan hunter-gatherers. In exchange, cultural information regarding use of vegetation (e.g., Cenchrus, Digitaria) in the Central Sahara (e.g., Uan Tabu, Uan Muhuggiag) was shared by Central Saharan hunter-gatherers with incoming Early Pastoral peoples. Migration of hunter-gatherers and cattle herders out of the Central Sahara occurred as the Green Sahara underwent desertification in 4000 BP. Seasonal waterways were the likely migratory route taken to the Niger River, Chad Basin, and Nile Valley. Dwelling in the Sahelian region began to occur as long inhabited settlement and funerary sites of the northern region of Niger stopped being used. Migration of Central Saharan peoples into the Sahelian region of Sub-Saharan Africa is verified via Saharan influenced pottery that appear in the Sahelian region.

Amid the Green Sahara, the mutation for sickle cell originated in the Sahara or in the northwest forest region of western Central Africa (e.g., Cameroon) by at least 7,300 years ago, though possibly as early as 22,000 years ago. The ancestral sickle cell haplotype to modern haplotypes (e.g., Cameroon/Central African Republic and Benin/Senegal haplotypes) may have first arose in the ancestors of modern West Africans, bearing haplogroups E1b1a1-L485 and E1b1a1-U175 or their ancestral haplogroup E1b1a1-M4732. West Africans (e.g., Yoruba and Esan of Nigeria), bearing the Benin sickle cell haplotype, may have migrated through the northeastern region of Africa into the western region of Arabia. West Africans (e.g., Mende of Sierra Leone), bearing the Senegal sickle cell haplotype, may have migrated into Mauritania (77% modern rate of occurrence) and Senegal (100%); they may also have migrated across the Sahara, into North Africa, and from North Africa, into Southern Europe, Turkey, and a region near northern Iraq and southern Turkey. Some may have migrated and introduced the Senegal and Benin sickle cell haplotypes into Basra, Iraq, where both occur equally. West Africans, bearing the Benin sickle cell haplotype, may have migrated into the northern region of Iraq (69.5%), Jordan (80%), Lebanon (73%), Oman (52.1%), and Egypt (80.8%).

The genomes of Africans commonly found to undergo adaptation are regulatory DNA, and many cases of adaptation found among Africans relate to diet, physiology, and evolutionary pressures from pathogens. Throughout Sub-Saharan Africa, genetic adaptation (e.g., rs334 mutation, Duffy blood group, increased rates of G6PD deficiency, sickle cell disease) to malaria has been found among Sub-Saharan Africans, which may have initially developed in 7300 BP. Sub-Saharan Africans have more than 90% of the Duffy-null genotype. In the rainforests of Central Africa, genetic adaptation for non-height-related factors (e.g., immune traits, reproduction, thyroid function) and short stature (e.g., EHB1 and PRDM5 – bone synthesis; OBSCN and COX10 – muscular development; HESX1 and ASB14 – pituitary gland's growth hormone production/secretion) has been found among rainforest hunter-gatherers.

Preceded by assumed earlier sites in the Eastern Sahara, tumuli with megalithic monuments developed as early as 4700 BCE in the Saharan region of Niger. These megalithic monuments in the Saharan region of Niger and the Eastern Sahara may have served as antecedents for the mastabas and pyramids of ancient Egypt. During Predynastic Egypt, tumuli were present at various locations (e.g., Naqada, Helwan).

The prehistoric tradition of monarchic tumuli-building is shared by both the West African Sahel and the Middle Nile regions. Ancient Egyptian pyramids of the early dynastic period and Meroitic Kush pyramids are recognized by Faraji (2022) as part of and derived from an earlier architectural "Sudanic-Sahelian" tradition of monarchic tumuli, which are characterized as "earthen pyramids" or "proto-pyramids." Faraji (2022) characterized Nobadia as the "last pharaonic culture of the Nile Valley" and described mound tumuli as being "the first architectural symbol of the sovereign's return and reunification with the primordial mound upon his death." Faraji (2022) indicates that there may have been a cultural expectation of "postmortem resurrection" associated with tumuli in the funerary traditions of the West African Sahel (e.g., northern Ghana, northern Nigeria, Mali) and Nile Valley (e.g., Ballana, Qustul, Kerma, Kush). Based on artifacts found in the tumuli from West Africa and Nubia, there may have been "a highly developed corporate ritual in which the family members of the deceased brought various items as offerings and tribute to the ancestors" buried in the tumuli and the tumuli may have "served as immense shrines of spiritual power for the populace to ritualize and remember their connection to the ancestral lineage as consecrated in the royal tomb."

Between the 8th millennia BCE and the 4th millennia BCE, riverine farmers and savanna herders traversed the interconnected region of the Middle Nile Valley. In the Saharan-Sahelian and Middle Nile Valley regions, dotted wavy line and wavy line pottery, which was produced between the 8th millennia BCE and the 4th millennia BCE (late Neolithic and early Bronze Age), preceded the emergence of monarchic tumuli; the spread of the pottery spanned from the savanna region to the eastern Saharan region, and from Mauritania to the Red Sea, which supports the conclusions of trade between the regions and their interconnectedness. Wavy-line pottery developed six ceramic subvariants and dotted wavy-line pottery developed three ceramic subvariants; the locations for the earliest development of both 8th millennium BCE potteries were at Sagai and Sarurab in Sudan. Wavy-line pottery spread throughout multiple locations (e.g., mostly in Central Nile; some in Hoggar Mountains, southern Algeria, Delibo Cave, Chad, Jebel Eghei, Chad, Tibesti, Chad, and Adrar Madet, Niger) in Africa. Dotted wavy-line pottery spread throughout multiple locations (e.g., Ennedi Plateau, Niger Plateau, and Wadi Howar of Saharan-Sahelian region, interconnecting the regions of the Middle Nile River, Lake Chad, and Benue-Niger River) in Africa as well. Both potteries also spread along a north-to-west regional axis (e.g., Wadi Howar, Ennedi Plateau, Chad, Jebel Uweinat, Gilf Kebir, Egypt) near the Saharan regions of Sudan and Egypt. The tumuli from the kingdom of Kerma serve as a regional intermediary between the regions of the Nile River and the Niger River.

The "Classical Sudanese" monarchic tumuli-building tradition, which lasted in Sudan (e.g., Kerma, Makuria, Meroe, Napata, Nobadia) until the early period of the 6th century CE as well as in West Africa and Central Africa until the 14th century CE, notably preceded the spread of Islam into the West African and Sahelian regions of Africa. According to al-Bakrī, "the construction of tumuli and the accompanying rituals was a religious endeavor that emanated from the other elements" that he described, such as "sorcerers, sacred groves, idols, offerings to the dead, and the "tombs of their kings."" Faraji (2022) indicated that the early dynastic period of ancient Egypt, Kerma of Kush, and the Nobadian culture of Ballana were similar to al-Bakrī's descriptions of the Mande tumuli practices of ancient Ghana. A characteristic of divine kingship sometimes includes monarchic funerary practices (e.g., Ancient Egyptian funerary practices). In the lake region of Niger, two human burial sites included funerary rooms with graves that contain various bones (e.g., human, animal) and items (e.g., beads, ornaments, weapons). In the Inland Niger Delta, 11th century CE and 15th century CE tumuli at El Oualedji and Koï Gourrey contained various bones (e.g., human, horse), human items (e.g., beads, bracelets, rings), and animal items (e.g., bells, harnesses, plaques). Cultural similarities were also found with a Malinke king of Gambia, who along with his senior queen, human subjects within his kingdom, and his weapons, were buried in his home under a large mound the size of the house, as described by V. Fernandes. Levtzion also acknowledged the cultural similarities between the monarchic tumuli-building traditions and practices (e.g., monumental Senegambian megaliths) of West Africa, such as Senegambia, Inland Niger Delta, and Mali, and the Nile Valley; these monarchic tumuli-building practices span the Sudanian savanna as manifestations of a trans-Sahelian common culture and heritage.

From the 5th millennium BCE to the 14th century CE, earthen and stone tumuli were developed between Senegambia and Chad. Among 10,000 burial mounds in Senegambia, 3,000 megalithic burial mounds in Senegambia were constructed between 200 BCE and 100 CE, and 7,000 earthen burial mounds in Senegal were constructed in the 2nd millennium CE. Between 1st century CE and 15th century CE, megalithic monuments without tumuli were constructed. Megalithic and earthen Senegambian tumuli, which may have been constructed by the Wolof people (Serer people) or Sosse people (Mande peoples). Sudanese tumuli (e.g., Kerma, C-Group), which date to the mid-3rd millennium BCE, share cultural similarities with Senegambian tumuli. Between the 6th century CE and 14th century CE, stone tumuli circles, which at a single site usually encircle a burial site of half-meter that is covered by a burial mound, were constructed in Komaland; the precursors for this 3rd millennium BCE tumuli style of Komaland, Ghana and Senegambia are regarded by Faraji (2022) to be Kerma Kush and the A-Group culture of ancient Nubia. While the stele-circled burial mounds of C-Group culture of Nubia are regarded as precursors for the megalithic burial mounds of Senegambia, Kerma tumuli are regarded as precursors for the stone tumuli circles of Komaland. Based on a founding narrative of the Hausa people, Faraji (2022) concludes the possibility of the "pre-Islamic rulers of Hausaland" being a "dynasty of female monarchs reminiscent of the kandake of Meroitic Kush." The tumuli of Durbi Takusheyi, which have been dated between the 13th century CE and the 16th century CE, may have connection to tumuli from Ballana and Makuria. Tumuli have also been found at Kissi, in Burkina Faso, and at Daima, in Nigeria.

Haplogroup R-V88 may have originated in western Central Africa (e.g., Equatorial Guinea), and, in the middle of the Holocene, arrived in North Africa through population migration.

The Bouar Megaliths in the western region of Central African Republic, which may have been developed between 3500 BCE and 2700 BCE during the late Neolithic Era, may be evidence of an advanced level of habitation.

Prehistoric West Africans may have diverged into distinct ancestral groups of modern West Africans and Bantu-speaking peoples in Cameroon, and, subsequently, around 5000 BP, the Bantu-speaking peoples migrated into other parts of Sub-Saharan Africa (e.g., Central African Republic, African Great Lakes, South Africa).

Between late 3rd millennium BCE and mid-2nd millennium CE, megaliths (e.g., monuments, cairn burials) were constructed in the regions (e.g., Eastern Adamawa, Oubanguian Ridge, Chad/Congo watershed) in Central African Republic and Cameroon, throughout various periods (e.g., Balimbé: 2000 BCE – 1000 BCE; Early Gbabiri: 950 BCE – 200 BCE; Late Gbabiri: 200 BCE – 500 CE; Bouboun: 500 CE – 1600 CE), for various purposes (e.g., ritual practices, territorial marking).

The savanna and forest of West Africa and savanna and forest of Central Africa are the areas that chimpanzees originate and dwell. As such, though rather speculative, by the 2nd millennium BCE, chimpanzees and/or their artistic depictions (e.g., "seated" and "crouched" chimpanzee statuettes developed between 2300 BCE and 1500 BCE) may have been exchanged in a long-distance trade network from West Africa or Central Africa, through East Africa (e.g., Elmenteitan) and Arabia, into the Near East (e.g., Elam). Another possibility (as via report of Hanno the Navigator) is that, via maritime trade from the Gulf of Guinea, to the eastern region of the Mediterranean, along the Incense Route, into the Near East. Additionally, it may have been traded from West Africa, via pathways through North Africa and Rome in the 2nd century CE, into the Near East.

In 4000 BP, there may have been a population that traversed from Africa (e.g., West Africa or West-Central Africa), through the Strait of Gibraltar, into the Iberian Peninsula, where admixing between Africans and Iberians (e.g., of northern Portugal, of southern Spain) occurred.

Extensive walled sites and settlements, which may have been constructed during the 1st millennium BCE, were found in Zilum, Chad approximately 60 km (37 mi) southwest of Lake Chad.

Rock art in Central Africa is generally located between the savanna and the Congo Basin forest. There is rock art found in Cameroon (e.g., Bidzar; Galdi, Adamaoua; Djebel Mela, in Kotto and Lengo; Mbomou, Bangassou in Bakouma), the Democratic Republic of Congo (e.g., Bas-Congo; Ngembo; Fwakumbi), in Angola (e.g., Mbanza Kongo; Calola; Capelo; Bambala Rock Formations in the Upper Zambezi Valley), and in Gabon (e.g., Ogooue, Otoumbi; Oogoue, Kaya Kaya; Lope National Park). The engraved rock art (e.g., circular marks, concentric circles, cupules, petals) of Bidzar, Cameroon, which was likely engraved using a hammer, is likely no older than the Early Iron Age (2500 BP – 1500 BP).

Between 2500 BP and 1800 BP, amid the Iron Age, at Lope National Park, Okanda, Gabon, 1680 engraved rock art in total were created with iron implements (e.g., chisels) by Bantu-speaking peoples during the Bantu migration. Among the 670 engravings in the western region of Elarmekora and Epona, there are specifically 240 petroglyphs at Elarmekora and 410 petroglyphs at Epona. At Elarmekora, there are hunting depictions of assegai and animals (e.g., four-legged animals, lizards, a giant-headed insect, tortoise carapace) and a non-hunting depiction of a hoe. At Epona, there are various geometric depictions (e.g., concentric circles), which compose 98% of the overall depictions and may bear the symbolic meaning of cosmic cycles and the flow of time, as well as depictions of five lizards, and a single/double-bladed Bantu throwing knife. In the eastern region of Kongo Boumba, there are 1010 petroglyphs. At Kongo Boumba, there are various geometric depictions (e.g., circles, chain-like circles, concentric circles, concentric circle arches, dissected circles, pecked circles, stitched shapes, spirals), 35% of all depictions being chain-like depictions; there are also depictions of snake-like lines, cruciform, lizards, double-bladed throwing knives, small axes, oval-bladed throwing knives with handles and spurs. There are also some realistic animal depictions of lizards, six-legged lizards that appear commonly in African symbolisms, and a dotted hoe layered atop a throwing knife (the most common depiction on rock art in Central Africa) that indicates there were two distinct timeframes that engraving has occurred. At Elarmekora, pottery, with concentric circles like found on the rock art, were found in deposits which dated to 1850 BP, and radiocarbon dating has provided dates between 2300 BP and 1800 BP. At Kongo Boumba, the Okanda ceramic tradition dates from the 2nd century BCE to the 2nd century CE.

At Kindoki, in the Democratic Republic of Congo, there were three individuals, dated to the protohistoric period (230 BP, 150 BP, 230 BP); one carried haplogroups E1b1a1a1d1a2 (E-CTS99, E-CTS99) and L1c3a1b, another carried haplogroup E (E-M96, E-PF1620), and the last carried haplogroups R1b1 (R-P25 1, R-M415) and L0a1b1a1.

At Ngongo Mbata, in the Democratic Republic of Congo, an individual, dated to the protohistoric period (220 BP), carried haplogroup L1c3a. At Matangai Turu Northwest, in the Democratic Republic of Congo, an individual, dated to the Iron Age (750 BP), carried an undetermined haplogroup(s).
