= History of Central Africa =

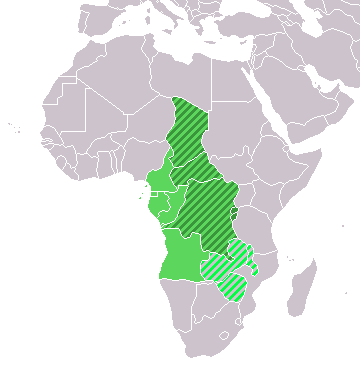
Map of Central Africa: Dark Green: Central Africa (Geographic) Medium Green: Middle Africa (UN Subregion) Light Green/Gray: Central African Federation (Political: Defunct)

The history of Central Africa has been divided into its prehistory, its ancient history, the major polities flourishing, the colonial period, and the post-colonial period, in which the current nations were formed. Central Africa is the central region of Africa, bordered by North Africa, West Africa, East Africa, Southern Africa, the Atlantic Ocean, and the Sahara Desert. Colonial boundaries are reflected in the modern boundaries between contemporary Central African states, cutting across ethnic and cultural lines, often dividing single ethnic groups between two or more states.

== Geography ==
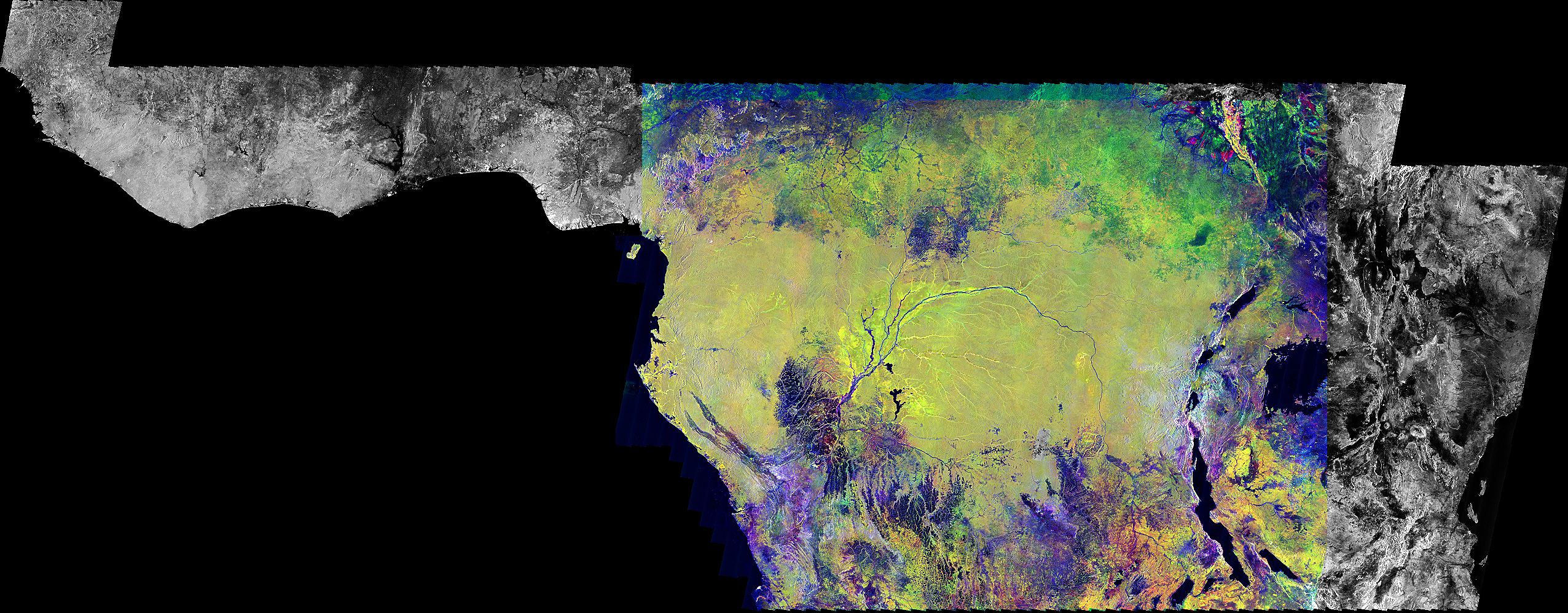
Satellite imagery of Central Africa.

The area located at the south of the desert is a steppe, a semi-arid region, called the Sahel. It is the ecoclimatic and biogeographic zone of transition in Africa between the Sahara desert to the north and the Sudanian Savanna to the south. The Sudanian Savanna is a broad belt of tropical savanna that spans the African continent, from the Atlantic Ocean coast in the West Sudanian savanna to the Ethiopian Highlands in the East Sudanian savanna.

== Climate ==
In 15,000 BP, the West African Monsoon transformed the landscape of Africa and began the Green Sahara period; greater rainfall during the summer season resulted in the growth of humid conditions (e.g., lakes, wetlands) and the savanna (e.g., grassland, shrubland) in North Africa. Between 5500 BP and 4000 BP, the Green Sahara period ended.

== Prehistory ==
By at least 2,000,000 BP, Central Africa (e.g., Ishango, Democratic Republic of Congo) was occupied by early hominins.

In 90,000 BP, the oldest fishing-related bone tools (e.g., barbed harpoons) of Africa were developed in Central Africa, particularly, Katanda, Central African Republic.

Between 25,000 BP and 20,000 BP, hunter-fisher-gatherer peoples in Central Africa (e.g., Ishango, Democratic Republic of Congo) utilized fishing tools and natural resources from nearby water sources, as well as may have engaged in and recorded mathematics (e.g., Ishango bone, which may demonstrate knowledge and use of the duodecimal system, prime numbers, multiplication).

== Iron Age ==
Archaeometallurgical scientific knowledge and technological development originated in numerous centers of Africa; the centers of origin were located in West Africa, Central Africa, and East Africa; consequently, as these origin centers are located within inner Africa, these archaeometallurgical developments are thus native African technologies. Central Africa provides possible evidence of iron working as early as the 3rd millennium BCE. In particular, evidence of iron-smelting in the Central African Republic and Cameroon may date back to 3000 BCE to 2500 BCE. Gbabiri, Central African Republic has yielded evidence of iron metallurgy, from a reduction furnace and blacksmith workshop, with its earliest dates being 896 BCE – 773 BCE and 907 BCE – 796 BCE.

Dates are approximate, consult particular article for details
Iron Age

== Ancient history ==
Rock art in Central Africa is generally located between the savanna and the Congo Basin forest. There is rock art found in Cameroon (e.g., Bidzar; Galdi, Adamaoua; Djebel Mela, in Kotto and Lengo; Mbomou, Bangassou in Bakouma), the Democratic Republic of Congo (e.g., Bas-Congo; Ngembo; Fwakumbi), in Angola (e.g., Mbanza Kongo; Calola; Capelo; Bambala Rock Formations in the Upper Zambezi Valley), and in Gabon (e.g., Ogooue, Otoumbi; Oogoue, Kaya Kaya; Lope National Park).

The engraved rock art (e.g., circular marks, concentric circles, cupules, petals) of Bidzar, Cameroon, which was likely engraved using a hammer, is likely no older than the Early Iron Age (2500 BP - 1500 BP).

=== Bantu expansion ===
Between 2500 BP and 1800 BP, amid the Iron Age, at Lope National Park, Okanda, Gabon, 1680 engraved rock art in total were created with iron implements (e.g., chisels) by Bantu-speaking peoples during the Bantu migration. Among the 670 engravings in the western region of Elarmekora and Epona, there are specifically 240 petroglyphs at Elarmekora and 410 petroglyphs at Epona. At Elarmekora, there are hunting depictions of assegai and animals (e.g., four-legged animals, lizards, a giant-headed insect, tortoise carapace) and a non-hunting depiction of a hoe. At Epona, there are various geometric depictions (e.g., concentric circles), which compose 98% of the overall depictions and may bear the symbolic meaning of cosmic cycles and the flow of time, as well as depictions of five lizards, and a single/double-bladed Bantu throwing knife. In the eastern region of Kongo Boumba, there are 1010 petroglyphs. At Kongo Boumba, there are various geometric depictions (e.g., circles, chain-like circles, concentric circles, concentric circle arches, dissected circles, pecked circles, stitched shapes, spirals), 35% of all depictions being chain-like depictions; there are also depictions of snake-like lines, cruciform, lizards, double-bladed throwing knives, small axes, oval-bladed throwing knives with handles and spurs. There are also some realistic animal depictions of lizards, six-legged lizards that appear commonly in African symbolisms, and a dotted hoe layered atop a throwing knife (the most common depiction on rock art in Central Africa) that indicates there were two distinct timeframes that engraving has occurred. At Elarmekora, pottery, with concentric circles like found on the rock art, were found in deposits which dated to 1850 BP, and radiocarbon dating has provided dates between 2300 BP and 1800 BP. At Kongo Boumba, the Okanda ceramic tradition dates from the 2nd century BCE to the 2nd century CE.

=== Sao civilization ===
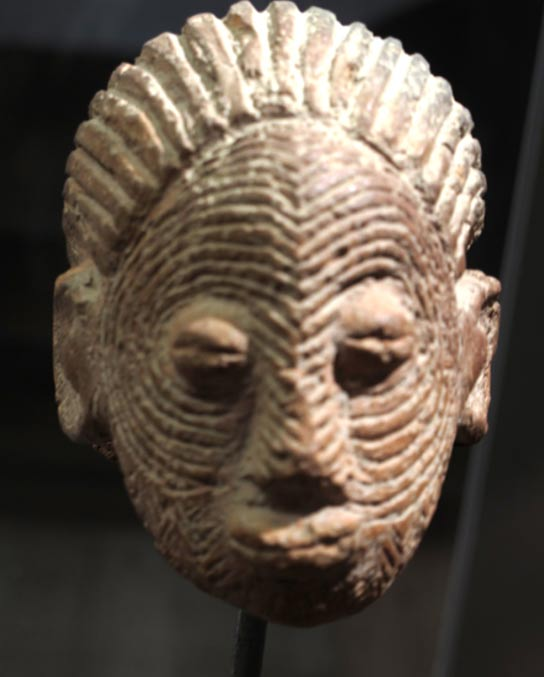
Terracotta Sao statuette

Sao civilisation began as early as the 6th century BCE or the 4th century BCE, and by the end of the 1st millennium BCE, their presence was well established around Lake Chad and near the Chari River. The city states of the Sao reached their apex at some point between the 9th century CE and 15th CE.

Although some scholars estimate that the Sao civilization south of Lake Chad lasted until the 14th century CE or the 15th century CE, the predominant consensus is that it ceased to exist as a separate culture sometime in the 16th century CE subsequently to the expansion of the Bornu Empire. The Kotoko are the inheritors of the former city states of the Sao.

== Post-classical history ==
=== Kanem Empire ===
In the 8th century CE, Wahb ibn Munabbih used Zaghawa to describe the Teda-Tubu group, in the earliest use of the ethnic name. Muhammad ibn Musa al-Khwarizmi also mentions the Zaghawa in the 9th century CE, as did Ibn al-Nadim in his Kitāb al-Fihrist in the 10th century CE. Kanem comes from anem, meaning south in the Teda and Kanuri languages, and hence a geographic term. During the 1st millennium CE, as the Sahara underwent desiccation, people speaking the Kanembu language migrated to Kanem in the south. This group contributed to the formation of the Kanuri people. Kanuri traditions state the Zaghawa dynasty led a group of nomads called the Magumi. The area already possessed independent, walled city-states belonging to the Sao culture. Under the leadership of the Duguwa dynasty, the Kanembu would eventually dominate the Sao, but not before adopting many of their customs.

=== Bornu Empire ===
By the end of the 14th century CE, internal struggles and external attacks had torn Kanem apart. War with the So brought the death of four Mai: Selemma, Kure Gana, Kure Kura, and Muhammad, all sons of 'Abdullāh b. Kadai. Then, war with the Bulala resulted in the death of four Mai in succession between 1377 CE and 1387 CE: Dawūd, Uthmān b. Dawūd, Uthmān b. Idris, and Bukar Liyāu. Finally, around 1387 CE, the Bulala forced Mai Umar b. Idris to abandon Njimi and move the Kanembu people to Bornu on the western edge of Lake Chad.

But even in Bornu, the Sayfawa Dynasty's troubles persisted. During the first three-quarters of the 15th century CE, for example, fifteen Mais occupied the throne. Then, around 1460 CE Ali Gazi (1473 CE – 1507 CE) defeated his rivals and began the consolidation of Bornu. He built a fortified capital at Ngazargamu, to the west of Lake Chad (in present-day Nigeria), the first permanent home a Sayfawa mai had enjoyed in a century. So successful was the Sayfawa rejuvenation that by the early 16th century CE Mai Idris Katakarmabe (1507 CE – 1529 CE) was able to defeat the Bulala and retake Njimi, the former capital. The empire's leaders, however, remained at Ngazargamu because its lands were more productive agriculturally and better suited to the raising of cattle. Ali Gaji was the first ruler of the empire to assume the title of Caliph.

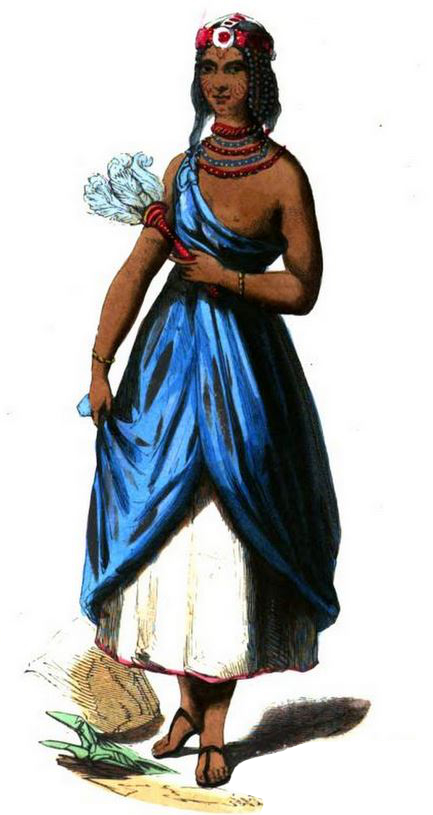
Young woman from Bornu, mid-19th century CE

=== Kongo Kingdom ===
The first king of the Kingdom of Kongo, Dya Ntotila, was Nimi a Nzima and Luqueni Luansanze's son Lukeni lua Nimi (c. 1380 CE – 1420 CE). After the death of Nimi a Lukeni, his brother, Mbokani Mavinga, took over the throne and ruled until approximately 1467 CE. The Kilukeni Kanda — or "house", as it was recorded in Portuguese documents — ruled Kongo unopposed until 1567 CE.

=== Shilluk Kingdom ===
According to Shilluk legends, the kingdom was founded in 1490 CE. Its legendary first ruler ("Reth") was the hero known as Nyikang who claimed to be half-crocodile and possessed power over the rain. Nyikang was the son of a king, Okwa, who ruled a country located "far south near a large lake". This may be Lake Albert, where the Acholi live. After Okwa's death, Nyikang went to war with his brother Duwadh, the legitimate successor to the throne. Facing defeat, Nyikang left his homeland with his retinue and migrated northeast to Wau (near the Bahr el Ghazal, "river of gazelles" in Arabic). Here (known by the Shilluk as the Pothe Thuro) Nyikang married the daughter of Dimo, the local magician. After a conflict with Dimo Nyikang migrated north (crossing the Bahr el Ghazal) to Acietagwok (a Shilluk village about 30 kilometres (19 mi) west of the village of Tonga) around 1550 CE. Nyikang then traveled to Nyilual, an uninhabited region west of the present town of Malakal. In the end, legends claim that Nyikang vanished in a whirlwind in the middle of a battle.

== Modern history ==
=== Sultanate of Bagirmi ===
The Bagirmi carried a tradition that they migrated from far to the east, which is supported by the resemblance of their language to various tribes on the White Nile. It is not entirely clear when and by whom Bagirimi kingdom was founded: some king lists trace this event to 1480 CE, when it was supposedly founded by Mbang Abd al-Mahmud Begli, while others deem Mbang Birni Besse responsible, who is said to have founded the kingdom in 1522 CE. He seems to have displaced the earlier Bulala, while he also began to build a palace in Massenya, the capital of the state. The fourth king, Abdullah (1568 CE – 1608 CE), adopted Islam and converted the state into a sultanate, permitting the state to extend their authority over many pagan tribes in the area, including the area's Saras, Gaberi, Somrai, Gulla, Nduka, Nuba, and Sokoro.

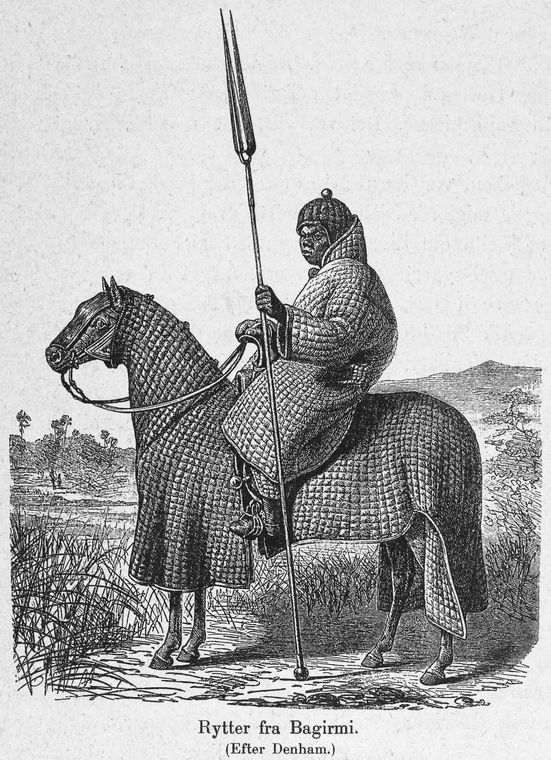
"Horseman from Bagirmi" by Dixon Denham, 1823.

=== Kingdom of Luba ===
Archaeological research shows that the Upemba depression had been occupied continuously since at least the 4th century CE. In the 4th century CE, the region was occupied by iron-working farmers. Over the centuries, the people of the region learned to use nets, harpoons, make dugout canoes, and clear canals through swamps. They had also learned techniques for drying fish, which were an important source of protein; they began trading the dried fish with the inhabitants of the protein-starved savanna.

By the 6th century CE, fishing people lived on lakeshores, worked iron, and traded palm oil.

By the 10th century CE, the people of Upemba had diversified their economy, combining fishing, farming and metal-working. Metal-workers relied on traders to bring them the copper and charcoal that they needed in smelting. Traders exported salt and iron items, and imported glass beads and cowry shells from the distant Indian Ocean.

By the 14th century CE, the people of the region were organized into various successful farming and trading communities — the gradual process of the communities merging began. Some communities began to merge into larger, more centralized ones; the reason for this is likely because of competition for increasingly limited resources.

=== Kingdom of Ndongo ===
The Kingdom of Ndongo was a tributary to the Kingdom of Kongo along with various other polities outside of Kongo proper. The Kingdom of Mbundu in the south and the BaKongo in the north were always at odds, but Kongo managed to exact tribute from these states since before the colonization by the Portuguese.

=== Anziku Kingdom ===
The word Anziku comes from the KiKongo phrase "Anziku Nziku" meaning "to run" referring to inhabitants who leave the interior to protect the border. The term was applied most famously to the Bateke, which is why the state is sometimes called the kingdom of Teke or Tiyo. Other groups within the Anziku included the Bampunu and Banzabi.

In the early 17th century CE, the Anziku population controlled the copper mines around Kongo's northeast border and may have been there specifically as a buffer. When the Anziku groups consolidated to form their own independent kingdom, Kongo proceeded to take over the mines. This process was complete by the 1620s CE. There was, however, fighting between the two states over the region throughout the 17th century CE.

=== Kasanje Kingdom ===
The Kasanje Kingdom, also known as the Jaga Kingdom, (1620 CE – 1910 CE) was a pre-colonial Central African state. It was formed in 1620 CE by a mercenary band of Imbangala, which had deserted the Portuguese ranks. The state gets its name from the leader of the band, Kasanje, who settled his followers on the upper Kwango River. The Kasanje people were ruled by the Jaga, a king who was elected from among the three clans who founded the kingdom.

=== Kingdom of Matamba ===
The first documentary mention of the Kingdom of Matamba is a reference to it giving tribute to the King of Kongo, then Afonso I of Kongo, in 1530 CE. In 1535 CE, Afonso subsequently mentioned Matamba as one of the regions over which he ruled as king in his titles. There is no further information on the kingdom's early history and modern oral traditions do not seem to illuminate this at the present state of research. However, it does not seem likely that Kongo had any more than a light and symbolic presence in Matamba, and its rulers were probably quite independent. Matamba undoubtedly had closer relations with its south southeastern neighbor Ndongo, then a powerful kingdom as well as with Kongo.

During the mid-16th century CE, Matamba was ruled by queen Njinga, who received missionaries from Kongo, then a Christian kingdom, dispatched by King Diogo I (1545 CE – 1561 CE). Though this queen received the missionaries and perhaps allowed them to preach, there is no indication that the kingdom converted to Christianity.

=== Wadai Empire ===
Prior to the 1630s CE, Wadai, also known as Burgu to the people of Darfur, was a pre-Islamic Tunjur kingdom, established around 1501 CE.

=== Kingdom of Lunda ===
Initially, the core of what would become the Lunda confederation was a commune called a N'Gaange in the kiLunda (kiyaka-kipunu) language. It was ruled over by a monarch called the Mwane-a- n'Gaange. One of these rulers, Ilunga Tshibinda, came from the nation of Luba where his brother ruled and married a royal woman from a nation to their south. Their son became the first paramount ruler of the Lunda, creating the title of Mwane-a-Yamvu (c. 1665 CE).

=== Kuba Kingdom ===
The kingdom began as a conglomeration of several chiefdoms of various ethnic groups with no real central authority. In approximately 1625 CE, an individual from outside the area known as Shyaam a-Mbul a Ngoong usurped the position of one of the area rulers and united all the chiefdoms under his leadership. Tradition states that Shyaam a-Mbul was the adopted son of a Kuba queen. He left the Kuba region to find enlightenment in the Pende and Kongo kingdoms to the west. After learning all he could from these states, he returned to Kuba to form the empire's political, social and economic foundations.

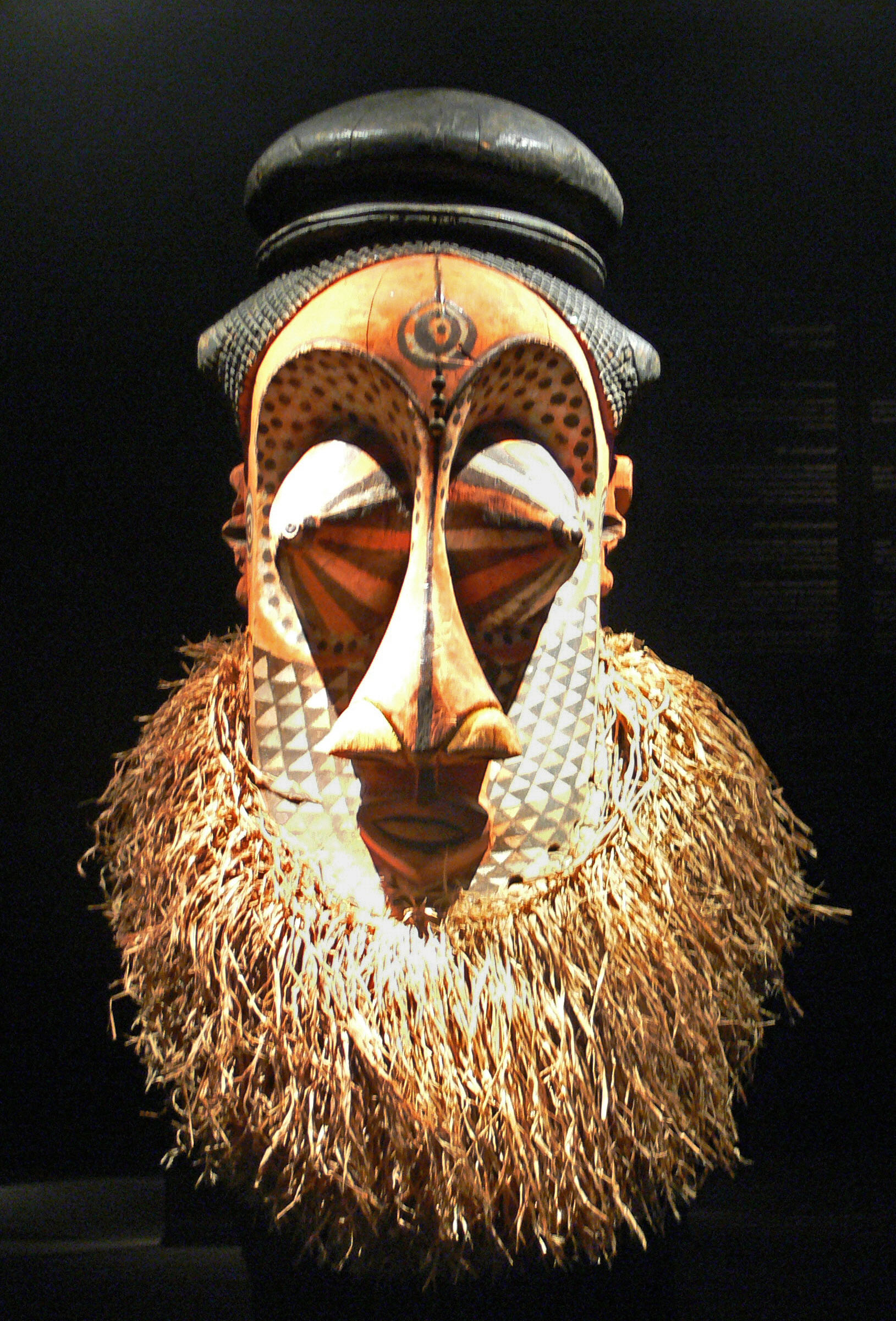
Helmet mask "mulwalwa", Southern Kuba, 19th century CE or early 20th century CE

=== Mbunda Kingdom ===
The kingdom was ultimately conquered in a war with Portugal in 1914 CE, called the Kolongongo War.

=== Adamawa Emirate ===
The Fula first settled in the area in the 14th century CE.

=== Yeke Kingdom ===
The Yeke Kingdom (also called the Garanganze or Garenganze kingdom) of the Garanganze people in Katanga, DR Congo, was short-lived, existing from about 1856 CE to 1891 CE under one king, Msiri, but it became for a while the most powerful state in south-central Africa, controlling a territory of about half a million square kilometres. The Yeke Kingdom also controlled the only trade route across the continent from east to west, since the Kalahari Desert and Lozi Kingdom in the south and the Congo rainforest in the north blocked alternative routes. It achieved this control through natural resources and force of arms—Msiri traded Katanga's copper principally, but also slaves and ivory, for gunpowder and firearms—and by alliances through marriage. The most important alliances were with Portuguese–Angolans in the Benguela area, with Tippu Tip in the north and with Nyamwezi and Swahili traders in the east, and indirectly with the Sultan of Zanzibar who controlled the east coast traders.

=== Colonial period ===
==== Scramble for Africa ====
Between October 26, 1917 CE and May 18, 1919 CE, René Grauwet found a metal Osiris statuette, which, as a result of examination, was determined to be created in Egypt (8th century BCE – 1st century CE); it was found on the right side of the Lualaba River, near Bukama, in the Republic of the Congo.

== History of Central African Architecture ==
Further information in the sections of Architecture of Africa:

- Ancient Central African Architecture
- Medieval Central African Architecture

== History of science and technology in Central Africa ==
Further information in the sections of History of science and technology in Africa:

- Mathematics
- Textiles
- Communication systems
- By country

== Genetic history of Central Africa ==
=== Archaic Human DNA ===
Archaic traits found in human fossils of West Africa (e.g., Iho Eleru fossils, which dates to 13,000 BP) and Central Africa (e.g., Ishango fossils, which dates between 25,000 BP and 20,000 BP) may have developed as a result of admixture between archaic humans and modern humans or may be evidence of late-persisting early modern humans. While Denisovan and Neanderthal ancestry in non-Africans outside of Africa are more certain, archaic human ancestry in Africans is less certain and is too early to be established with certainty.

=== Ancient DNA ===
In 4000 BP, there may have been a population that traversed from Africa (e.g., West Africa or West-Central Africa), through the Strait of Gibraltar, into the Iberian Peninsula, where admixing between Africans and Iberians (e.g., of northern Portugal, of southern Spain) occurred.

==== Cameroon ====
West African hunter-gatherers, in the region of western Central Africa (e.g., Shum Laka, Cameroon), particularly between 8000 BP and 3000 BP, were found to be related to modern Central African hunter-gatherers (e.g., Baka, Bakola, Biaka, Bedzan).

==== Democratic Republic of Congo ====
At Kindoki, in the Democratic Republic of Congo, there were three individuals, dated to the protohistoric period (230 BP, 150 BP, 230 BP); one carried haplogroups E1b1a1a1d1a2 (E-CTS99, E-CTS99) and L1c3a1b, another carried haplogroup E (E-M96, E-PF1620), and the last carried haplogroups R1b1 (R-P25 1, R-M415) and L0a1b1a1.

At Ngongo Mbata, in the Democratic Republic of Congo, an individual, dated to the protohistoric period (220 BP), carried haplogroup L1c3a.

At Matangai Turu Northwest, in the Democratic Republic of Congo, an individual, dated to the Iron Age (750 BP), carried an undetermined haplogroup(s).

=== Y-Chromosomal DNA ===
Haplogroup R-V88 may have originated in western Central Africa (e.g., Equatorial Guinea), and, in the middle of the Holocene, arrived in North Africa through population migration.

=== Mitochondrial DNA ===
In 150,000 BP, Africans (e.g., Central Africans, East Africans) bearing haplogroup L1 diverged. Between 75,000 BP and 60,000 BP, Africans bearing haplogroup L3 emerged in East Africa and eventually migrated into and became present in modern West Africans, Central Africans, and non-Africans. Amid the Holocene, including the Holocene Climate Optimum in 8000 BP, Africans bearing haplogroup L2 spread within West Africa and Africans bearing haplogroup L3 spread within East Africa. As the largest migration since the Out of Africa migration, migration from Sub-Saharan Africa toward the North Africa occurred, by West Africans, Central Africans, and East Africans, resulting in migrations into Europe and Asia; consequently, Sub-Saharan African mitochondrial DNA was introduced into Europe and Asia.

Mitochondrial haplogroup L1c is strongly associated with pygmies, especially with Bambenga groups. L1c prevalence was variously reported as: 100% in Ba-Kola, 97% in Aka (Ba-Benzélé), and 77% in Biaka, 100% of the Bedzan (Tikar), 97% and 100% in the Baka people of Gabon and Cameroon, respectively, 97% in Bakoya (97%), and 82% in Ba-Bongo. Mitochondrial haplogroups L2a and L0a are prevalent among the Bambuti.

=== Autosomal DNA ===
Genetically, African pygmies have some key difference between them and Bantu-speaking peoples.

=== Medical DNA ===
Evidence suggests that, when compared to other Sub-Saharan African populations, African pygmy populations display unusually low levels of expression of the genes encoding for human growth hormone and its receptor associated with low serum levels of insulin-like growth factor-1 and short stature.

The genomes of Africans commonly found to undergo adaptation are regulatory DNA, and many cases of adaptation found among Africans relate to diet, physiology, and evolutionary pressures from pathogens. Throughout Sub-Saharan Africa, genetic adaptation (e.g., rs334 mutation, Duffy blood group, increased rates of G6PD deficiency, sickle cell disease) to malaria has been found among Sub-Saharan Africans, which may have initially developed in 7300 BP. Sub-Saharan Africans have more than 90% of the Duffy-null genotype. In the rainforests of Central Africa, genetic adaptation for non-height-related factors (e.g., immune traits, reproduction, thyroid function) and short stature (e.g., EHB1 and PRDM5 – bone synthesis; OBSCN and COX10 – muscular development; HESX1 and ASB14 – pituitary gland's growth hormone production/secretion) has been found among rainforest hunter-gatherers.

== Timeline of archaeological cultures and sites ==
- Leba Cave (500,000 BP – 40,000 BP)
- Lupemban culture (270,000 BP – 170,000 BP)
- Mousteroid (80,000 BP – 50,000 BP)
- Mount Hoyo (40,700 BP)
- Matupi Cave (40,000 BP – 3000 BP)
- Mosumu (30,300 BP)
- Shum Laka (30,000 BP)
- Lope (Ogooue-Ivindo province) (7670 BP)
- Ndende (Ngounie province) (6450 BP)
- Ndtoua (4460 BCE – 4225 BCE)
- Leiterband Complex (4th millennium BCE – 3rd millennium BCE)
- Denis River (5000 BP – 3000 BP)
- Mban I (1610 BCE – 1250 BCE)
- Bissiang (1105 BCE – 805 BCE)
- Boso-Njafo (1st millennium BCE)
- Zili (940 BCE – 530 BCE)
- Dombe (815 BCE – 420 BCE)
- Meyang (800 BCE – 350 BCE)
- Ezezang (774 BCE – 385 BCE)
- Ongot (550 BCE – 1 CE)
- Kango (Estuaire province) (2460 BP)
- Makouré (395 BCE – 100 BCE)
- Nanga (390 BCE – 90 BCE)
- Djaoro Mbama (170 BCE – 115 CE)
- Ndjore (50 BCE – 240 CE)
- Koukony (50 BCE – 250 CE)
- Mayongo (50 CE – 240 CE)
- Madingo Kayes (74 CE – 352 CE)
- Karmankass (130 CE – 670 CE)
- Binguela II (230 CE – 545 CE)
- Bidjouka (320 CE – 640 CE)
- Sao civilization (1500 BP)
- Missi Madji (685 CE – 890 CE)
- Nana-Mode village (7th century CE – 8th century CE)
- Begon II (890 CE – 1030 CE)
- Kolle (890 CE – 1220 CE)
- Sokorta Manga (960 CE – 1040 CE)
- Bekia (970 CE – 1160 CE)
- Bedia (980 CE – 1170 CE)
- Badila (1020 CE – 1270 CE)
- Beka Petel (1025 CE – 1275 CE)
- Dodang (1280 CE – 1420 CE)
- Diy-Gid-Biy (13th century CE – 15th century CE)
- Kakongo (pre-1500 CE)
- Ngoyo (15th century CE)
- Beboura (1660 CE – 1950 CE)
- Bemboyo (1660 CE – 1950 CE)
- Ngon Mbang (1660 CE – 1950 CE)

== See also ==
- List of kingdoms in Africa throughout history#Central Africa
