= African Pygmies =

Group of ethnicities native to Central Africa

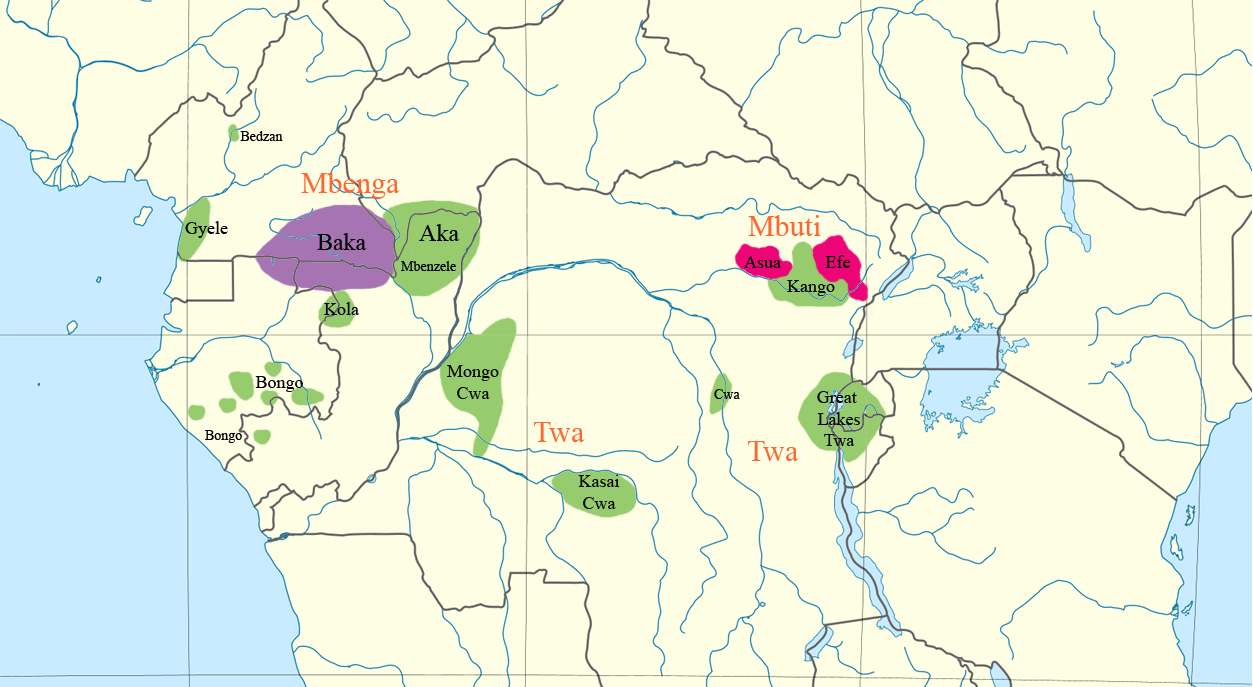
A map showing the distribution of Congo Pygmies and their languages according to Bahuchet (2006). The southern Twa are not shown.

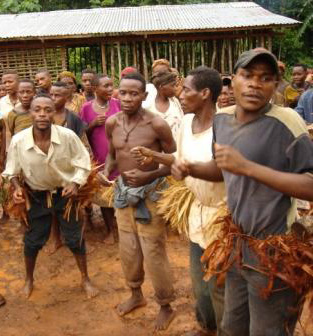
Baka dancers in the East Province of Cameroon (2006)

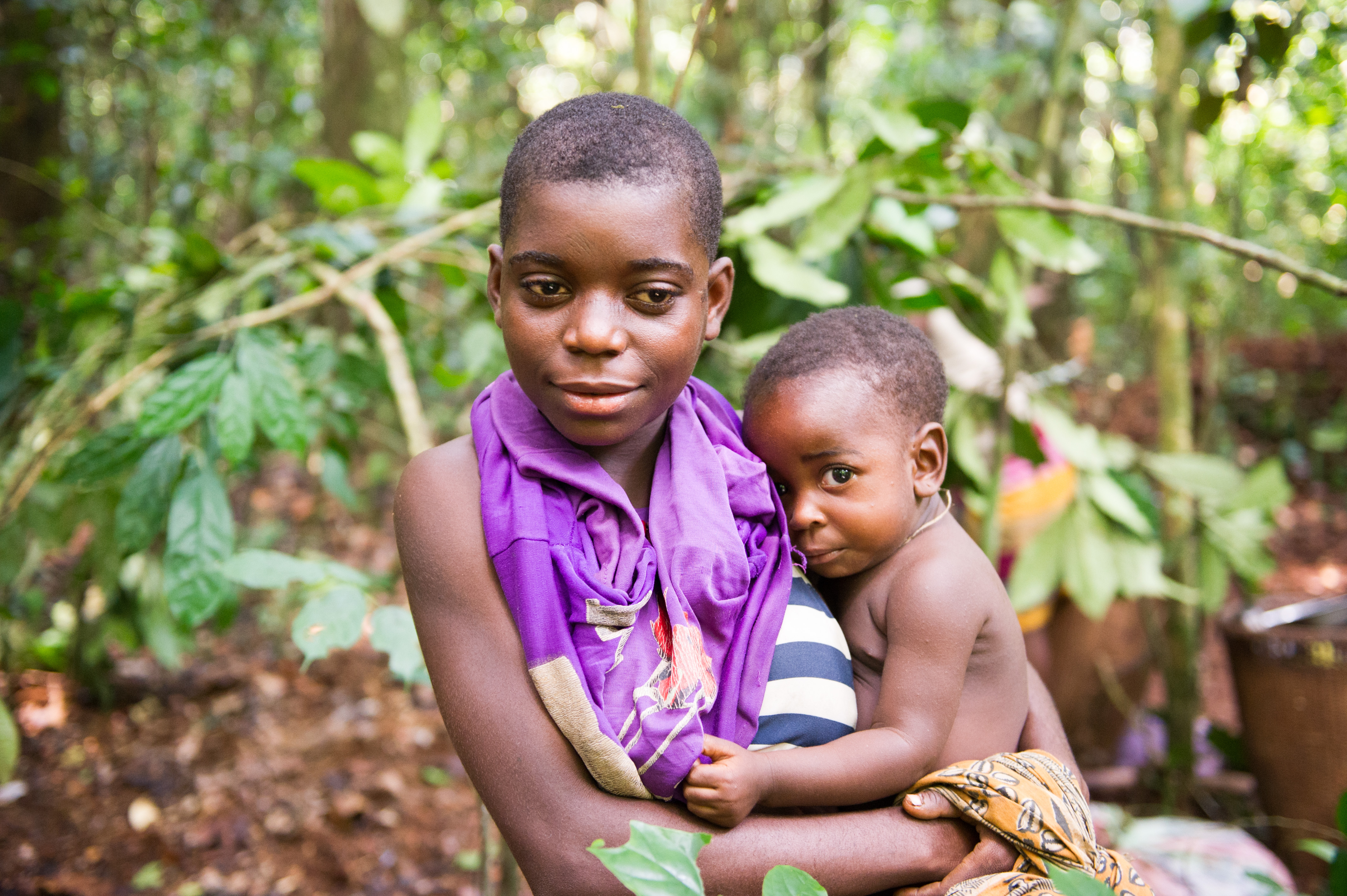
Aka mother and child, Central African Republic (2014)

The African Pygmies (or Congo Pygmies, variously also Central African foragers, African rainforest hunter-gatherers (RHG) or Forest People of Central Africa) (Note: "Central African foragers" is used (in some cases alongside "pygmies") in e.g.: Susan Kent, Cultural Diversity Among Twentieth-Century Foragers: An African Perspective (2006); Richard Bradshaw, Juan Fandos-Rius, Historical Dictionary of the Central African Republic (2016), p. 11; Schlebusch et al. (2017). "[African] rainforest hunter-gatherers" is used in population genetics from c. 2015, Fagny, Maud; Patin, Etienne; MacIsaac, Julia L; Rotival, Maxime; Flutre, Timothée; Jones, Meaghan J; et al. (2015). "The epigenomic landscape of African rainforest hunter-gatherers and farmers". Nature Communications. 6 10047. Bibcode:2015NatCo...610047F. doi:10.1038/ncomms10047. PMC 4674682. PMID 26616214. The alternative "Forest People [of Central Africa]" sees limited use in the early 2000s, e.g., Racism Against Indigenous Peoples, International Work Group for Indigenous Affairs (2001), p. 312; Thomas Widlok, Wolde Gossa Tadesse (eds.), Property and Equality vol. 2 (2005), p. 104.) are a group of ethnicities native to Central Africa, mostly the Congo Basin, traditionally subsisting on a forager and hunter-gatherer lifestyle. They are divided into three roughly geographic groups:

- The western Bambenga, or Mbenga (Cameroon, Gabon, Republic of the Congo, Central African Republic),
- the eastern Bambuti, or Mbuti, of the Congo Basin (DRC)
- the central and southern Batwa, or Twa (Rwanda, Burundi, DRC, Tanzania, Uganda, Zambia, Angola and Namibia). The more widely scattered (and more variable in physiology and lifestyle) Southern Twa are also grouped under the term Pygmoid.

They are notable for, and named for, their short stature (described as "pygmyism" in anthropological literature). They are assumed to be descended from the original Middle Stone Age expansion of anatomically modern humans to Central Africa, albeit substantially affected by later migrations from West Africa, from their first appearance in the historical record in the 19th century limited to a comparatively small area within Central Africa, greatly decimated by the prehistoric Bantu expansion, and to the present time widely affected by enslavement at the hands of neighboring Bantu, Ubangian and Central Sudanic groups.

Most contemporary Pygmy groups partially forage and partially trade with neighboring farmers to acquire cultivated foods and material items; no group lives deep in the forest without access to agricultural products. A total number of about 900,000 Pygmies were estimated to be living in the central African forests in 2016, about 60% of this number in the Democratic Republic of Congo. The number does not include Southern Twa populations, who live outside of the Central Africa forest environment, partly in open swamp or desert environments.

Additionally, West African hunter-gatherers may have dwelled in western Central Africa earlier than 32,000 BP and dwelled in West Africa between 16,000 BP and 12,000 BP until as late as 1000 BP or some period of time after 1500 CE. West African hunter-gatherers, many of whom dwelt in the forest–savanna region, were ultimately acculturated and admixed into larger groups of West African agriculturalists, akin to the migratory Bantu-speaking agriculturalists and their encounters with Central African hunter-gatherers.

== Name ==
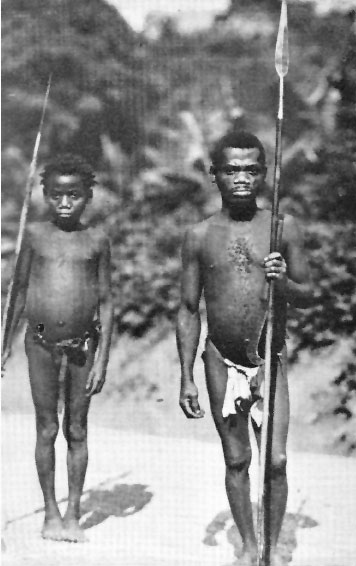
Congo Pygmy father and son (Belgian Congo at War, 1942)

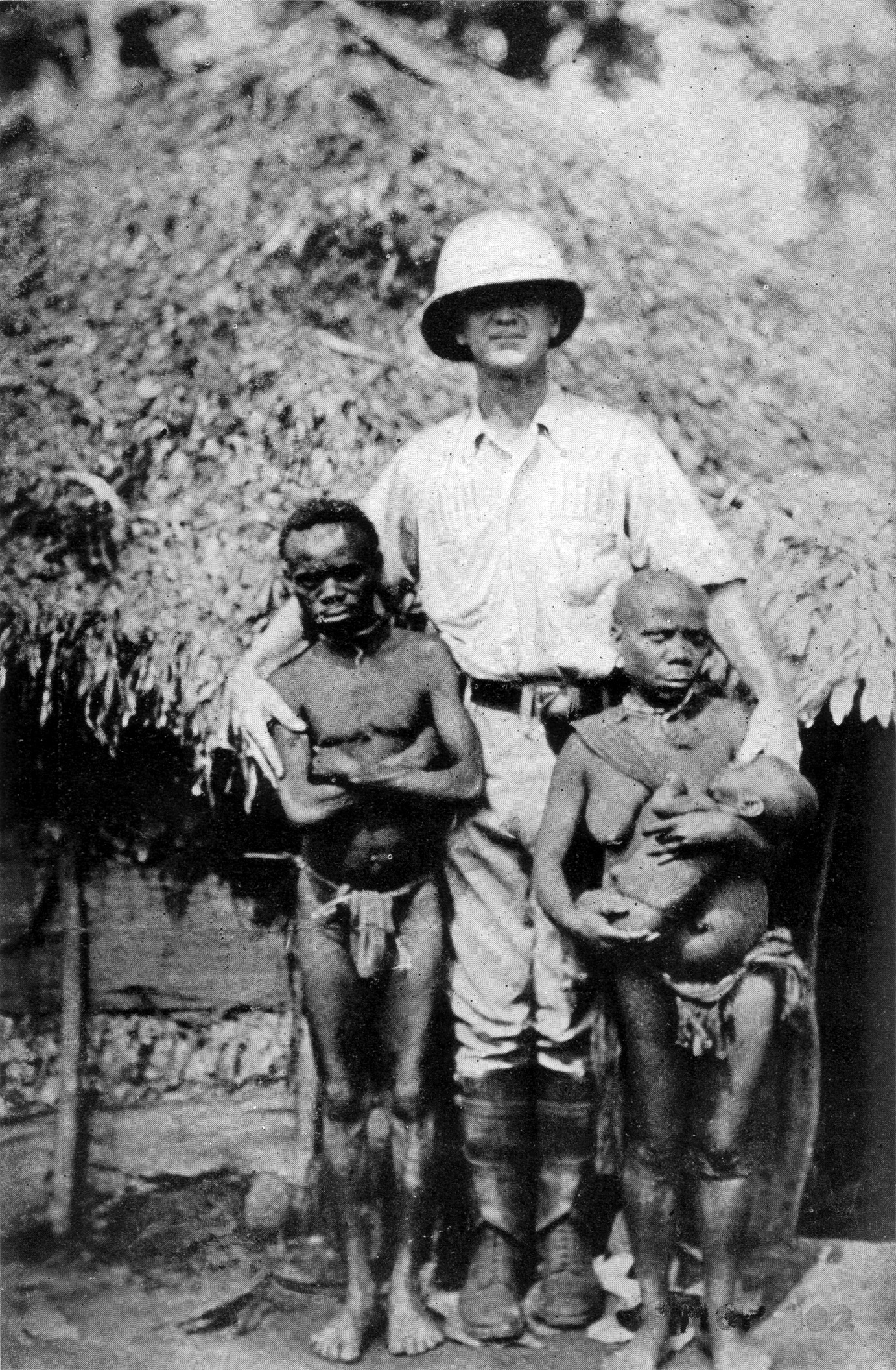
Pygmy family posing with a European man for scale (Collier's New Encyclopedia, 1921)

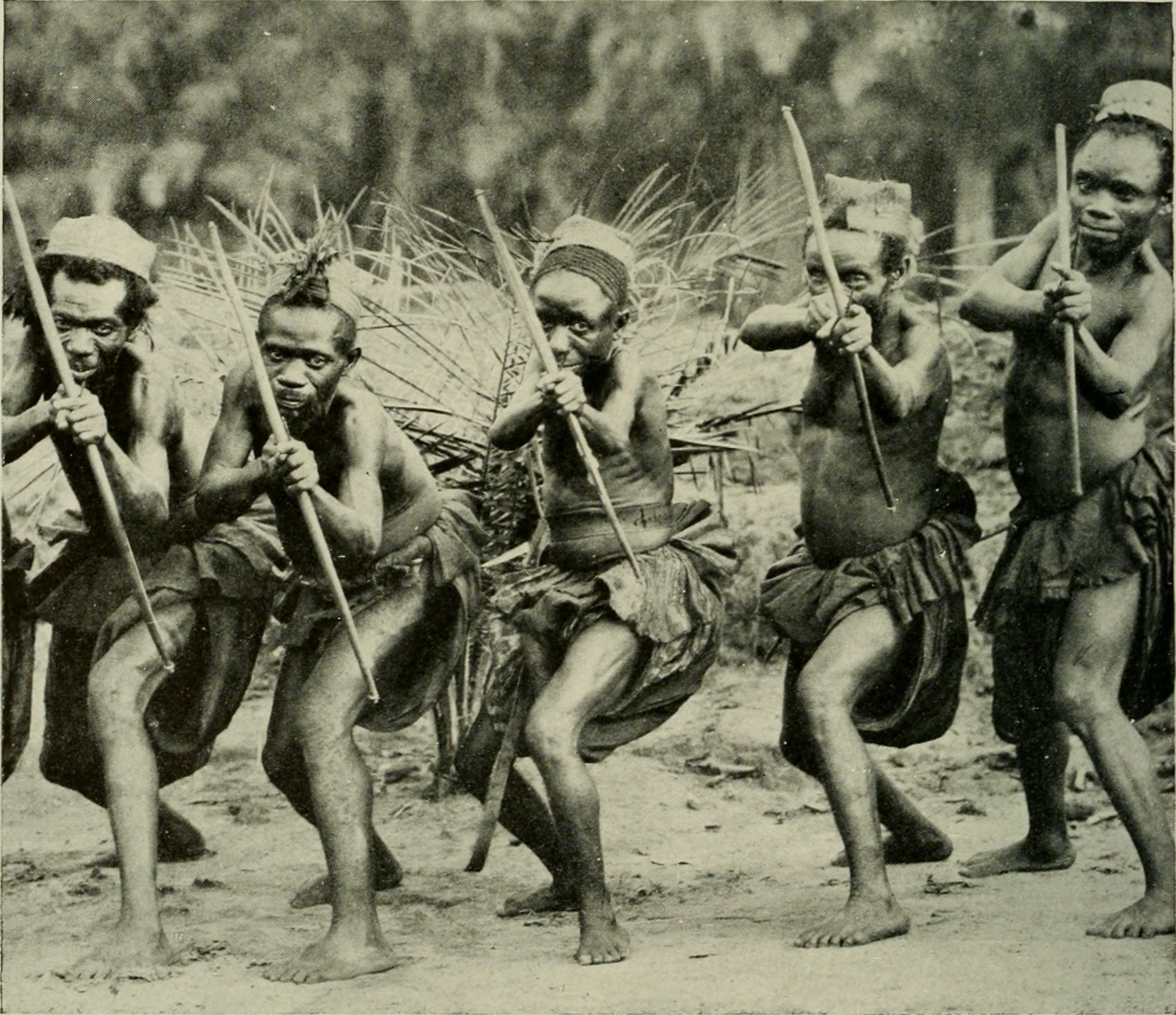
A group of Pygmy men from Nala (Haut-Uele, northeastern Congo) posing with bows and arrows (c. 1915)

The term Pygmy, as used to refer to diminutive people, derives from Greek πυγμαῖος pygmaios (via Latin Pygmaeus, plural Pygmaei), a term for "dwarf" from Greek mythology. The word is derived from πυγμή pygmē, a term for "cubit" (lit. 'fist'), suggesting a diminutive height.

The use of "Pygmy" in reference to the small-framed African hunter-gatherers dates to the early 19th century, in English first by John Barrow, Travels Into the Interior of Southern Africa (1806). However, the term was used diffusely, and treated as unsubstantiated claims of "dwarf tribes" among the Bushmen of the interior of Africa, until the exploration of the Congo basin. In the 1860s, two Western explorers, Paul Du Chaillu and Georg Schweinfurth, claimed to have found the mythical "Pygmies". A commentator wrote in 1892 that, thirty years ago (viz., in the 1860s), "nobody believed in the existence of African dwarf tribes" and that "it needed an authority like Dr. Schweinfurth to prove that pygmies actually exist in Africa" (referencing Georg August Schweinfurth's The Heart of Africa, published 1873). "African Pygmy" is used for disambiguation from "Asiatic Pygmy", a name applied to the Negrito populations of Southeast Asia.

Dembner (1996) reported a universal "disdain for the term 'pygmy'" among the Pygmy peoples of Central Africa: the term is considered a pejorative, and people prefer to be referred to by the name of their respective ethnic or tribal groups, such as Bayaka, Mbuti and Twa. There is no clear replacement for the term "Pygmy" in reference to the umbrella group. A descriptive term that has seen some use since the 2000s is "Central African foragers".

Regional names used collectively of the western group of Pygmies are Bambenga (the plural form of Mbenga), used in the Kongo language, and Bayaka (the plural form of Aka/Yaka), used in the Central African Republic.

== Groups ==
The Congo Pygmy speak languages of the Niger–Congo and Central Sudanic language families. There has been significant intermixing between the Bantu and Pygmies.

There are at least a dozen Pygmy groups, sometimes unrelated to each other. They are grouped in three geographical categories:

- the western Bambenga (Mbenga) of Cameroon and Gabon, the Bayaka (Aka and Baka), the Bakola or Bakoya (Gyele and Kola), and the Bongo; these groups are speakers of Bantu and Ubangian languages
- the Bambuti (Mbuti) of the Ituri Rainforest, speakers of Bantu and Central Sudanic languages
- the widely scattered Batwa:
  - the Great Lakes Twa of the Great Lakes, speakers of the Bantu Rundi and Kiga languages
  - the "Pygmoid" Southern Twa, not always included in the term "Pygmy", as they tend to be somewhat taller (male average above 155 cm). (Note: Hiernaux (1975) distinguished the Pygmies proper (Mbuti and Biaka), with an average male and female height of around 155 and 144 cm, from "Pygmoid" groups (Twa and neighbouring groups of Uganda, Rwuanda and South Congo) with a somewhat larger average height of 155 to 160 cm (cited after Cavalli-Sforza, L. Luca; Menozzi, Paolo; and Piazza Alberto (1994) The History and Geography of Human Genes Princeton, New Jersey: Princeton University Press, p. 168, Table "A Summary of Hiernaux's Classification (Hiernaux 1975) of the Sub-Saharan African Peoples").) Subgroups include the Echuya Twa, Mongo Twa, Lukanga Twa and Kafwe Twa.

== Origins and history ==
African Pygmies are often assumed to be the direct descendants of the Middle Stone Age hunter-gatherer peoples of the central African rainforest. Genetic evidence for the deep separation of Congo Pygmies from the lineage of West Africans and East Africans, as well as admixture from archaic humans, was found in the 2010s. The lineage of African Pygmies is strongly associated with mitochondrial (maternal line) haplogroup L1, with a divergence time between 170,000 and 100,000 years ago.

They were partially absorbed or displaced by later immigration of agricultural peoples of the Central Sudanic and Ubangian phyla beginning after about 5,500 years ago, and, beginning about 3,500 years ago, by the Bantu, adopting their languages.

=== Linguistic substrate ===
Substantial non-Bantu and non-Ubangian substrates have been identified in Aka and in Baka, respectively, on the order of 30% of the lexicon. Much of this vocabulary is botanical, deals with honey harvesting, or is otherwise specialized for the forest and is shared between the two western Pygmy groups. This substrate has been suggested as representing a remnant of an ancient "western Pygmy" linguistic phylum, dubbed "Mbenga" or "Baaka". However, as substrate vocabulary has been widely borrowed between Pygmies and neighboring peoples, no reconstruction of such a "Baaka" language is possible for times more remote than a few centuries ago.

An ancestral Pygmy language has been postulated for at least some Pygmy groups, based on the observation of linguistic substrates. According to Merritt Ruhlen (1994), "African Pygmies speak languages belonging to either the Nilo-Saharan or the Niger–Kordofanian family. It is assumed that Pygmies once spoke their own language(s), but that, through living in symbiosis with other Africans, in prehistorical times, they adopted languages belonging to these two families."

Roger Blench (1997, 1999) criticized the hypothesis of an ancestral "Pygmy language", arguing that even if there is evidence for a common ancestral language rather than just borrowing, it will not be sufficient to establish a specifically "Pygmy" origin rather than any of the several potential language isolates of (former) hunter-gatherer populations that ring the rainforest. He argued that the Pygmies do not form the residue of a single ancient stock of Central African hunter-gatherers, but that they are rather descended from several neighboring ethno-linguistic groups, independently adapting to forest subsistence strategies. Blench adduced the lack of clear linguistic and archaeological evidence for the antiquity of the African Pygmies, that the genetic evidence, at the time of his writing, was inconclusive, and that there is no evidence of the Pygmies having a hunting technology distinctive from that of their neighbors. He argued that the short stature of Pygmy populations can arise relatively quickly (in less than a few millennia) under strong selection pressures.

West African hunter-gatherers may have spoken a set of presently extinct Sub-Saharan West African languages. In the northeastern region of Nigeria, Jalaa, a language isolate, may have been a descending language from the original set(s) of languages spoken by West African hunter-gatherers.

=== Genetics ===
Genetic studies have found evidence that African Pygmies are descended from the Middle Stone Age people of Central Africa, with a separation time from West and East Africans of the order 130,000 years. African Pygmies in the historical period have been significantly displaced by, and assimilated to, several waves of Niger–Congo and Nilo-Saharan speakers, of the Central Sudanic, Ubangian, and Bantu phyla.

Genetically, African pygmies have some key differences between them and Bantu peoples. African pygmies' uniparental markers display the most ancient divergence from other human groups among anatomically modern humans, second only to those displayed among some Khoisan populations. Researchers identified an ancestral and autochthonous lineage of mtDNA shared by Pygmies and Bantus, suggesting that both populations were originally one, and that they started to diverge from common ancestors around 70,000 years ago. After a period of isolation, during which current phenotype differences between Pygmies and Bantu farmers accumulated, Pygmy women started marrying male Bantu farmers (but not the opposite). This trend started around 40,000 years ago, and continued until several thousand years ago. Subsequently, the Pygmy gene pool was not enriched by external gene influxes.

Mitochondrial haplogroup L1c is strongly associated with pygmies, especially with Bambenga groups. L1c prevalence was variously reported as: 100% in Ba-Kola, 97% in Aka (Ba-Benzélé), and 77% in Biaka, 100% of the Bedzan (Tikar), 97% and 100% in the Baka people of Gabon and Cameroon, respectively, 97% in Bakoya (97%), and 82% in Ba-Bongo. Mitochondrial haplogroups L2a and L0a are prevalent among the Bambuti.

Patin, et al. (2009) suggest two unique, late Pleistocene (before 60,000 years ago) divergences from other human populations, and a split between eastern and western pygmy groups about 20,000 years ago.

==== Ancient DNA ====
Ancient DNA was able to be obtained from two Shum Laka foragers from the early period of the Stone to Metal Age, in 8000 BP, and two Shum Laka foragers from the late period of the Stone to Metal Age, in 3000 BP.

The mitochondrial DNA and Y-Chromosome haplogroups found in the ancient Shum Laka foragers were Sub-Saharan African haplogroups. Two earlier Shum Laka foragers were of haplogroup L0a2a1 – broadly distributed throughout modern African populations – and two later Shum Laka foragers were of haplogroup L1c2a1b – distributed among both modern West and Central African agriculturalists and hunter-gatherers. One earlier Shum Laka forager was of haplogroup B and one later Shum Laka forager haplogroup B2b, which, together, as macrohaplogroup B, is distributed among modern Central African hunter-gatherers (e.g., Baka, Bakola, Biaka, Bedzan).

The autosomal admixture of the four ancient Shum Laka forager children was ~35% Western Central African hunter-gatherer and ~65% Basal West African – or, an admixture composed of a modern western Central African hunter-gatherer unit, a modern West African unit, existing locally before 8000 BP, and a modern East African/West African unit likely from further north in the regions of the Sahel and Sahara.

The two earlier Shum Laka foragers from 8000 BP and two later Shum Laka foragers from 3000 BP show 5000 years of population continuity in region. Yet, modern peoples of Cameroon are more closely related to modern West Africans than to the ancient Shum Laka foragers. Modern Cameroonian hunter-gatherers, while partly descended, are not largely descended from the Shum Laka foragers, due to the apparent absence of descent from Basal West Africans.

The Bantu expansion is hypothesized to have originated in a homeland of Bantu-speaking peoples located around western Cameroon, a part of which Shum Laka is viewed as being of importance in the early period of this expansion. By 3000 BP, the Bantu expansion is hypothesized to have already begun. Yet, the sampled ancient Shum Laka foragers – two from 8000 BP and two from 3000 BP – show that most modern Niger–Congo speakers are greatly distinct from the ancient Shum Laka foragers, thus, showing that the ancient Shum Laka people were not the ancestral source population of the modern Bantu-speaking peoples.

While Southern African hunter-gatherers are generally recognized as being the earliest divergent modern human group, having diverged from other groups around 250,000–200,000 BP, as a result of the sampling of the ancient Shum Laka foragers, Central African hunter-gatherers are shown to have likely diverged at a similar time, if not even earlier.

== Short stature ==
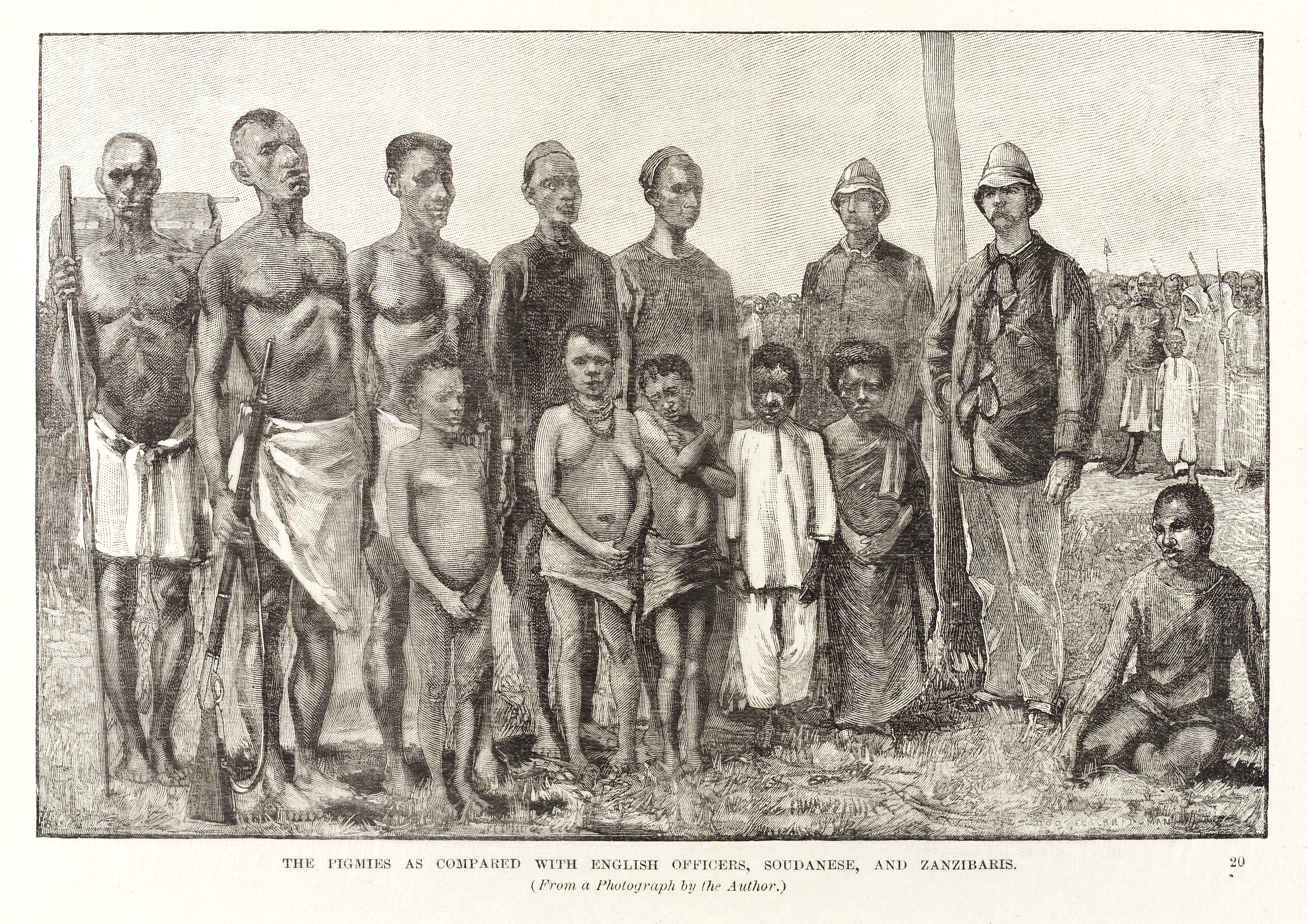
Size comparison between Pygmies, English officers, Sudanese and Zanzibaris (1890)

Various hypotheses have been proposed to explain the short stature of African pygmies. Becker, et al., suggest African pygmyism may have evolved as an adaptation to the significantly lower average levels of ultraviolet light available beneath the canopy of rainforest environments. In similar hypothetical scenarios, because of reduced access to sunlight, a comparatively smaller amount of anatomically formulated vitamin D is produced, resulting in restricted dietary calcium uptake, and subsequently restricted bone growth and maintenance, resulting in an overall population average skeletal mass near the lowest periphery of the spectrum among anatomically modern humans.

Other proposed explanations include the potentially lesser availability of protein-rich food sources in rainforest environments, the often reduced soil-calcium levels in rainforest environments, the caloric expenditure required to traverse rainforest terrain, insular dwarfism as an adaptation to equatorial and tropical heat and humidity, and pygmyism as an adaptation associated with rapid reproductive maturation under conditions of early mortality.

Additional evidence suggests that, when compared to other Sub-Saharan African populations, African pygmy populations display unusually low levels of expression of the genes encoding for human growth hormone and its receptor associated with low serum levels of insulin-like growth factor 1 and short stature.

A study by Price, et al., provides insight into the role genetics plays in the reduced stature of African pygmies:

[W]e found strong signals for selection in both African Pygmy groups at two genes involved in the iodide-dependent thyroid hormone pathway: TRIP4 in Mbuti Pygmies; and IYD in Biaka Pygmies. [...] These observations suggest that the Efe have adapted genetically to an iodine-deficient diet; we suggest that the signals of recent positive selection that we observe at TRIP4 in Mbuti Pygmies and IYD in Biaka Pygmies may reflect such genetic adaptations to an iodine-deficient diet. Furthermore, alterations in the thyroid hormone pathway can cause short stature. We therefore suggest that short stature in these Pygmy groups may have arisen as a consequence of genetic alterations in the thyroid hormone pathway. [...] [T]his would suggest that short stature [...] arose as an indirect consequence of selection in response to an iodine-deficient diet. Second, since different genes in the thyroid hormone pathway show signals of selection in Mbuti vs. Biaka Pygmies, this would suggest that short stature arose independently in the ancestors of Mbuti and Biaka Pygmies, and not in a common ancestral population. Moreover, most Pygmy-like groups around the world dwell in tropical forests, and hence are likely to have iodine-deficient diets. The possibility that independent adaptations to an iodine-deficient diet might therefore have contributed to the convergent evolution of the short stature phenotype in Pygmy-like groups around the world deserves further investigation.

== Music ==
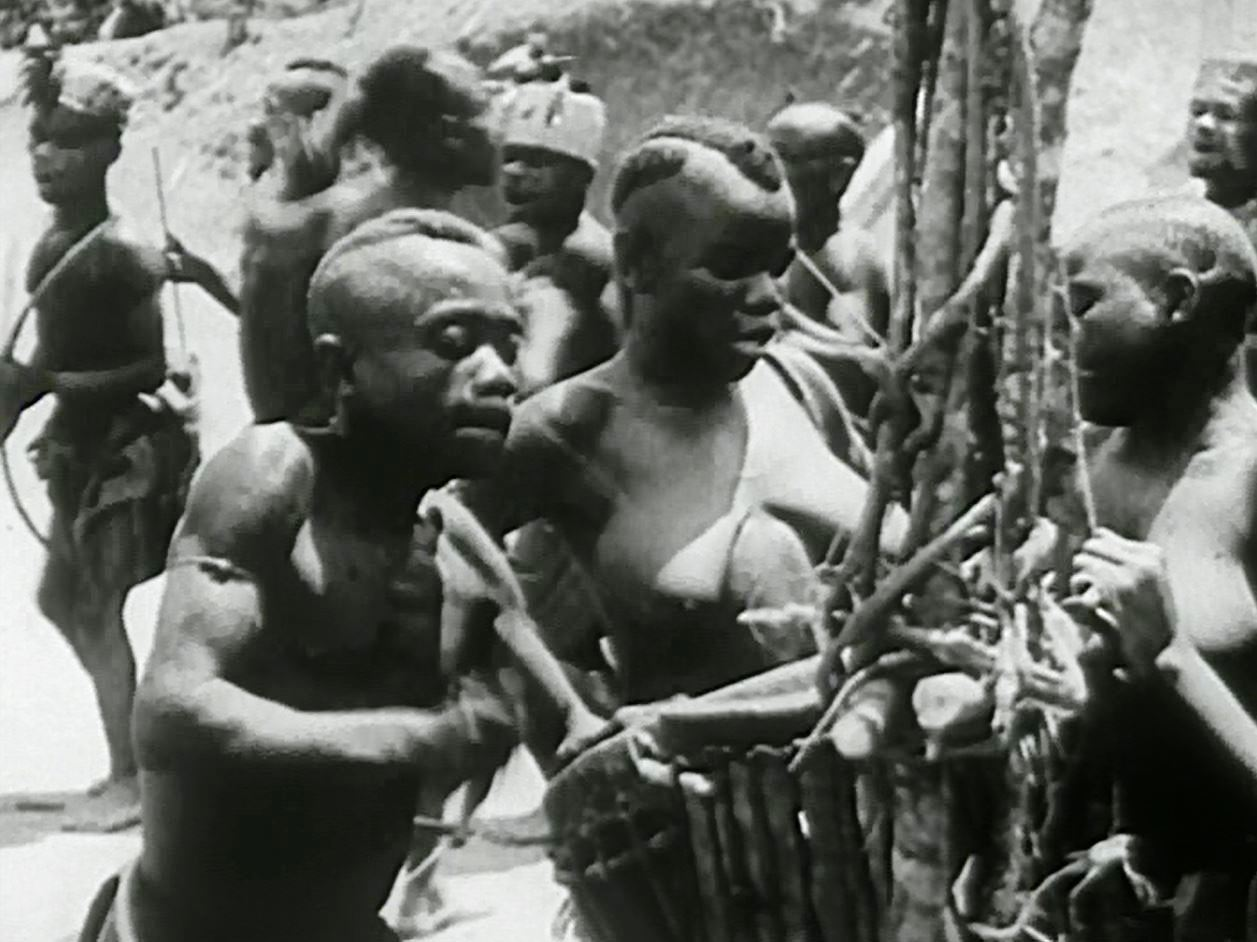
Pygmy drummers (1930)

The African Pygmies are particularly known for their vocal music, usually characterized by dense contrapuntal improvisation. Simha Arom says that the level of polyphonic complexity of Pygmy music was reached in Europe in the 14th century, yet Pygmy culture is unwritten and ancient, some Pygmy groups being the first known cultures in some areas of Africa.

Music permeates daily life, with songs for entertainment, special events, and communal activities. The Pygmy people are known to use an instrument called the n'dehou, which is a bamboo flute. The n'dehou only produces a single sound; however, the person using this instrument would wield their breath and inhale making high-pitched sounds; this allows the individual to make polyrhythmic music using a one-note instrument. Along with the different sounds of the breath and the n'dehou, the musician may also stomp their feet or tap on their chest to add even more dimension and complexity to the music. The n'dehou was popularized by Francis Bebey, a Cameroonian musical artist.

Polyphonic music is found among the Aka–Baka and the Mbuti, but not among the Gyele (Kola) or the various groups of Twa.

== Contemporary issues in society ==
=== Enslavement, cannibalism, and genocide ===
In the Republic of Congo, where Pygmies are estimated to make up 1.2–10% of the population, many Pygmies live as slaves to Bantu masters. The nation is deeply stratified between these two major ethnic groups. The Pygmy slaves belong from birth to their Bantu masters in a relationship that the Bantus call a time-honored tradition. Even though the Pygmies are responsible for much of the hunting, fishing and manual labor in jungle villages, Pygmies and Bantus alike say Pygmies are often paid at the master's whim: in cigarettes, used clothing, or even nothing at all. In 2022, after decades of facing these conditions and working to get legal protections for the Pygmies, a group of 45 indigenous organizations successfully petitioned the Democratic Republic of the Congo (DRC) government, and the Promotion and Protection of the Rights of the Indigenous Pygmy Peoples, the first legislation in the country that recognizes and safeguards the specific rights of the Indigenous pygmy peoples, was signed into law.

In the Democratic Republic of the Congo, during the Ituri conflict, Ugandan backed rebel groups were accused by the UN of enslaving Mbutis to prospect for minerals and forage for forest food, with those returning empty handed being killed and eaten.

In 2003, Sinafasi Makelo, a representative of Mbuti pygmies, told the UN's Indigenous People's Forum that during the Congo Civil War, his people were hunted down and eaten as though they were game animals. In neighboring North Kivu province there has been cannibalism by a death squad known as Les Effaceurs ("the erasers") who wanted to clear the land of people to open it up for mineral exploitation. Both sides of the war regarded them as "subhuman", and some say their flesh can confer magical powers.

Makelo asked the UN Security Council to recognize cannibalism as a crime against humanity and an act of genocide. According to Minority Rights Group International there is extensive evidence of mass killings, cannibalism and rape of Pygmies, and they have urged the International Criminal Court to investigate a campaign of extermination against pygmies. Although they have been targeted by virtually all the armed groups, much of the violence against Pygmies is attributed to the rebel group the Movement for the Liberation of Congo, which is part of the transitional government and still controls much of the north, as well as their allies.

Starting in 2013, the Pygmy Batwa people, whom the Luba people often exploit and allegedly enslave, rose up into militias (such as the "Perci" militia) in Northern Katanga Province and attacked Luba villages. A Luba militia known as "Elements" attacked back, notably killing at least 30 people in the "Vumilia 1" displaced people camp in April 2015. Since the start of the conflict, hundreds have been killed, and tens of thousands have been displaced from their homes. The weapons used in the conflict are often arrows and axes, rather than guns.

Ota Benga was a teenage pygmy boy from the Congo. Ota was purchased from slave traders and was brought to the United States to be exhibited for his unique looks. Ota had sharpened teeth as a result of the traditions of his tribe, and he was also short in stature. In 1906, Ota was brought to the Bronx Zoo and exhibited in the monkey house. Ota was given a bow and arrow for protection from the animals. After the exhibit was closed and World War I broke out, Ota was not able to return home to the Congo. He lived out the rest of his life in Virginia, until he became depressed and died by suicide at the age of 33.

=== Systematic discrimination ===
Historically, the Pygmy have always been viewed as inferior by both the village dwelling Bantu tribes and colonial authorities. This has translated into systematic discrimination. One early example was the capture of Pygmy children under the auspices of the Belgian colonial authorities, who exported Pygmy children to zoos throughout Europe, including the World's Fair in the United States in 1907.

Pygmies are often evicted from their land and given the lowest paying jobs. At a state level, Pygmies are not considered citizens by most African states, and are refused identity cards, deeds to land, health care and education access.

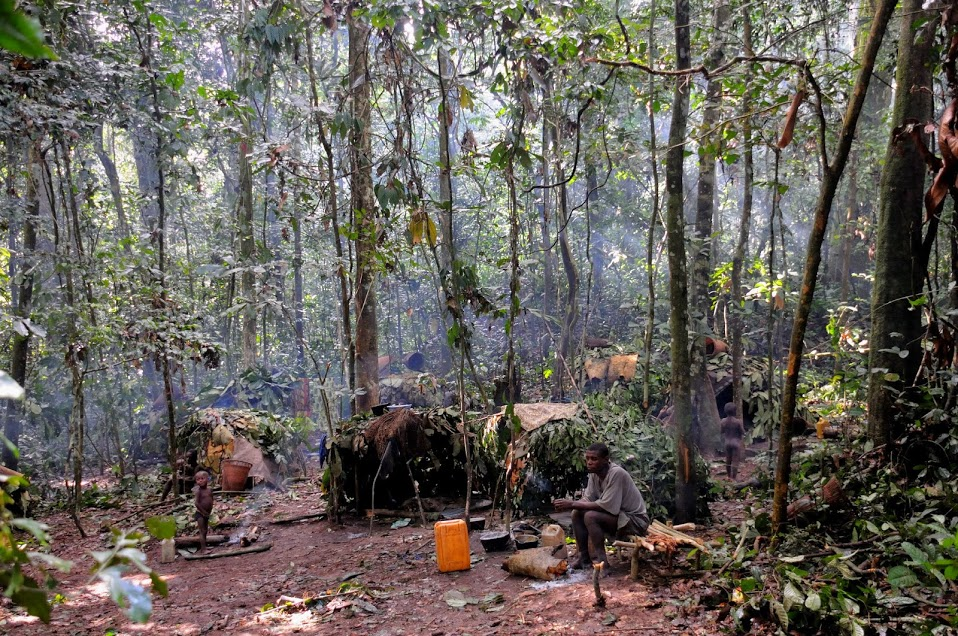
Aka Pygmies living in the Dzanga-Sangha Special Reserve in Central African Republic

There are roughly 500,000 Pygmies remaining in the rainforest of Central Africa. This population is rapidly decreasing as poverty, intermarriage with Bantu peoples, Westernization, and deforestation gradually destroy their way of life and culture.

The greatest environmental problem the Pygmies face is the loss of their traditional homeland, the tropical forests of Central Africa. In countries such as Cameroon, Gabon, Central African Republic and the Republic of Congo this is due to deforestation and the desire of several governments in Central Africa to evict the Pygmies from their forest habitat in order to profit from the sale of hardwood and the resettlement of farmers onto the cleared land. In some cases, as in Rwanda and the Democratic Republic of the Congo, this conflict is violent. Certain groups, such as the Hutus of the Interahamwe, wish to eliminate the Pygmy and take the resources of the forest as a military conquest, using the resources of the forest for military as well as economic advancement. Since the Pygmies rely on the forest for their physical as well as cultural survival, as these forests disappear, so do the Pygmy.

Along with Raja Sheshadri, the fPcN-Global.org website conducted research on the Pygmies. The human rights organization states that, as the forest has receded under logging activities, its original inhabitants have been pushed into populated areas to join the formal economy, working as casual laborers or on commercial farms and being exposed to new diseases. This shift has brought them into closer contact with neighboring ethnic communities whose HIV levels are generally higher. This has led to the spread of HIV into the pygmy group.

Since poverty has become very prevalent in Pygmy communities, sexual exploitation of indigenous women has become a common practice. Commercial sex has been bolstered by logging, which often places large groups of male laborers in camps which are set up in close contact with the Pygmy communities.

Human rights groups have also reported widespread sexual abuse of indigenous women in the conflict-ridden eastern Democratic Republic of the Congo. Despite these risks, Pygmy populations generally have poor access to health services and information about HIV. One British medical journal, The Lancet, published a review showing that Pygmy populations often had less access to health care than neighboring communities. According to the report, even where health care facilities exist, many Pygmies do not use them because they cannot pay for consultations and medicines, they do not have the documents and identity cards needed to travel or obtain hospital treatment, and they are subjected to humiliating and discriminatory treatment.

Studies in Cameroon and the DRC in the 1980s and 1990s showed a lower prevalence of HIV in Pygmy populations than among neighboring groups, but recent increases have been recorded. One study found that the HIV prevalence among the Baka Pygmies in eastern Cameroon rose from 0.7 percent in 1993 to 4 percent in 2003.

=== Deforestation ===
A consortium of researchers conducted a case study on the Pygmies of Africa and concluded that deforestation has greatly affected their everyday lives. Pygmy culture is threatened today by the forces of political and economic change.

== See also ==
- Bwiti – Spiritual discipline of West Africa
- Ethnic groups of Africa – List of African ethnic groups
- Khoisan – African ethno-linguistic grouping
- Mbuti – Indigenous pygmy groups in the Congo region of Africa
- Peopling of Africa – Spread of humans from Africa across the world
