= Basal West African =

Hypothetical West African archaeogenetic lineage

Basal West African is a hypothetical line of descent that is no longer extant.

== History ==
Utilizing Western Africans (e.g., Esan of Nigeria, Mende of Sierra Leone, western Gambians), the divergence of a set of early modern or archaic humans, numbering around 25,000 or between 23,000 and 27,000, from either the last common ancestor of the San people and all other modern humans, or humans and Neanderthals, is approximated to have occurred between 1,020,000 BP and 360,000 BP. Basal West Africans did not split before Neanderthals split from modern humans. Even before 300,000 BP to 200,000 BP, when the ancestors of the modern San split from other modern humans, the group to split the most early from modern humans may have been Basal West Africans.

Between 124,000 BP and 0 BP, 2% – 19% of the genes may have introgressed into ancestors of modern West Africans as a result of admixture with this archaic human population. Modern Western Africans (e.g., Yoruba of Ibadan, Nigeria, Mende of Sierra Leone) may have more ancestry from this lineage as a result of their ancestry from Basal West Africans. The same study also suggests that at least part of this archaic admixture is also present in Eurasians/non-Africans, and that the admixture event or events range from 0 to 124 ka B.P, which includes the period before the Out-of-Africa migration and prior to the African/Eurasian split (thus affecting in part the common ancestors of both Africans and Eurasians/non-Africans). Chen et al. (2020) found that Africans have higher Neanderthal ancestry than previously thought. 2,504 African samples from all over Africa were analyzed and tested on Neanderthal ancestry. All African samples showed evidence for minor Neanderthal ancestry, but always at lower levels than observed in Eurasians.

== West African Hunter-Gatherers, Khoisan, and Taforalts ==
While a less simpler modeling (without Basal West Africans) for the ancestry of the Shum Laka foragers was composed of ancient Taforalts from the Iberomaurusian culture and modern West Africans, among other types of modeling, one modeled the ancestry for the Shum Laka foragers as 65% Basal West African and 35% West African hunter-gatherer from western Central Africa. However, there is an absence of Basal West African ancestry in modern hunter-gatherers of Cameroon.

The peoples of southern Africa (e.g., Khoisan), who are closer in ancestry to peoples of East Africa, are more distant in ancestry to peoples of Western Africa. While contending with the model that supports Southern Africans as the earliest group to split from modern humans, Basal West Africans, as a hypothetical lineage, support two models of equal likelihood – an early basal group from Eastern Africa, which was part of an ancient genetic structure in Africa, are part of the modern ancestry of modern Western Africans (e.g., Yoruba, Mende) or the admixed ancestry of modern Western Africans (e.g., Yoruba, Mende) are the result of early migratory basal groups from different parts of Africa (i.e., Southeastern Africa, Western Africa).

In addition to having similarity with the remnant of a more basal Sub-Saharan African lineage (e.g., a Basal West African lineage shared between Yoruba and Mende peoples), the Sub-Saharan African DNA in the Taforalts of the Iberomaurusian culture may be best represented by modern West Africans (e.g., Yoruba).

== Descendants ==
Yoruba and Mende peoples descend from Basal West Africans and another set of ancestors akin to East Africans and Non-Africans, which is indicative of migration from East Africa. Yoruba people have less ancestry from Basal West Africans than Mende people do, which have a large amount of ancestry. More specifically, Yoruba people have 9% Basal West African ancestry and Mende people have 13% Basal West African ancestry.
