= Mousteroid =

Mousteroid was a culture occurring during the period 80,000 - 50,000 BP of Central, Southern and East Africa. Examples of this culture are the tool-industry of the Middle Paleolithic in West Africa, known from sites at Zenebi, Nigeria and Tiemassas in Senegal.

== Dakar and Rufisque ==
The most important of the Western Senegal sites is Pte. de Fann in Dakar. Classified Mousteroid, indicating similarities to industry Mousterian in form but neither akin to, nor at a temporal parallel. Other sites about Dakar and Rufisque, were part of a culture that had not occurred for sufficient duration for tools to be found at differing depths in the ground (without stratification).
