= West African hunter-gatherers =

Stone age peoples

West African hunter-gatherers, West African foragers, or West African pygmies dwelled in western Central Africa earlier than 32,000 BP and dwelled in West Africa between 16,000 BP and 12,000 BP until as late as 1000 BP or some period of time after 1500 CE. West African hunter-gatherers are archaeologically associated with the West African Microlithic Technocomplex. Despite its significance in the prehistory of West Africa, the peopling of various parts of Western Africa from the Sub-Saharan regions of coastal West Africa and the forests of western Central Africa often goes overlooked.

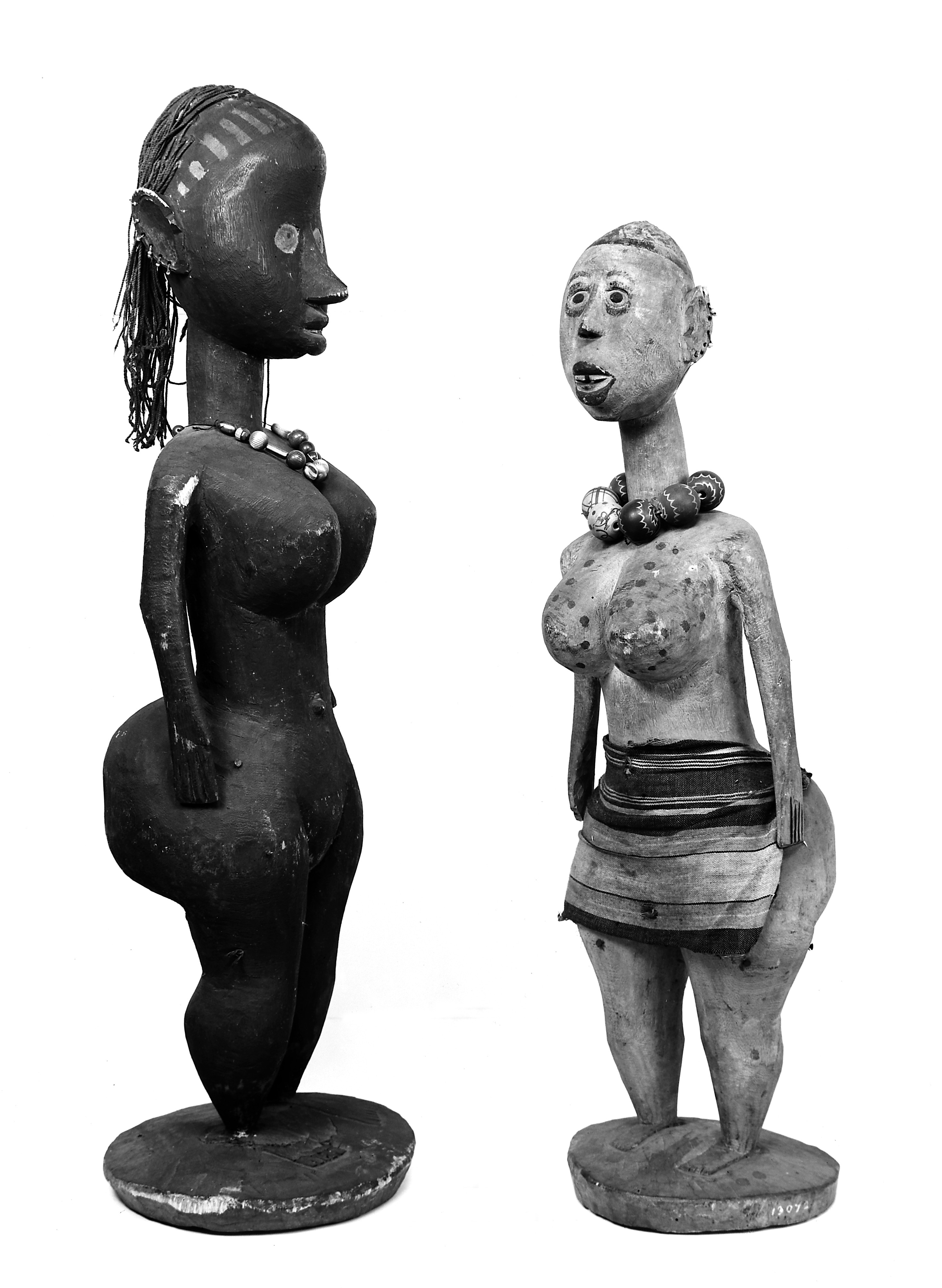
Representations of West African hunter-gatherers from the Dahomey region of Benin

Prior to West African hunter-gatherers, there may have been various peoples (e.g., Iwo Eleru people, possibly Aterians) who continuously occupied West Africa amid the Middle Stone Age. Macrolith-using late Middle Stone Age peoples (e.g., the possibly archaic human admixed or late-persisting early modern human Iwo Eleru fossils of the late Middle Stone Age), who dwelled in Central Africa, western Central Africa, and West Africa, were displaced by microlith-using Late Stone Age Africans (e.g., non-archaic human admixed Late Stone Age Shum Laka fossils dated between 7000 BP and 3000 BP) as they migrated from Central Africa, to western Central Africa, into West Africa. Earlier than 32,000 BP, or by 30,000 BP, Late Stone Age West African hunter-gatherers were dwelling in the forests of western Central Africa (e.g., earlier than 32,000 BP at de Maret in Shum Laka, 12,000 BP at Mbi Crater). Between 16,000 BP and 12,000 BP, Late Stone Age West Africans began dwelling in the eastern and central forested regions (e.g., Ghana, Ivory Coast, Nigeria; between 18,000 BP and 13,000 BP at Temet West and Asokrochona in the southern region of Ghana, 13,050 ± 230 BP at Bingerville in the southern region of Ivory Coast, 11,200 ± 200 BP at Iwo Eleru in Nigeria) of West Africa. West African hunter-gatherers resided at the Nigerian sites of Iwo Eleru and Rop, at the Ivorian site of Bingerville, at the Cameroonian site of Shum Laka, at the Malian site of Ounjougou, and at the Senegalese sites of Fatandi and Toumboura.

Prior to the Holocene era, interaction between West Africans migrating from the Sahara and West African hunter-gatherers of the savanna and forest regions were limited, as evidenced by West African hunter-gatherer microlithic cultural continuity. West African hunter-gatherers likely were the sole occupants of the savanna and forest regions of West Africa. Unlike Central African hunter-gatherers, who dwell in more secluded areas in the forests of Central Africa, West African hunter-gatherers likely dwelt in more open areas of West Africa. Migration of Saharan peoples south of the Sahelian region resulted in seasonal interaction and gradual absorption of West African hunter-gatherers, who primarily dwelt in the savannas and forests of West Africa. After having persisted as late as 1000 BP, or some period of time after 1500 CE, remaining West African hunter-gatherers, many of whom dwelt in the forest-savanna region, were ultimately acculturated and admixed into larger groups of West African agriculturalists, akin to the migratory Bantu-speaking agriculturalists and their encounters with Central African hunter-gatherers.

== Prehistory ==
=== Pleistocene ===
Middle Stone Age West Africans may have dwelled at Ounjougou, Mali (71,000 BP – 59,000 BP, 59,000 BP – 28,000 BP), Faleme Valley, Senegal (Late MIS 5), Tiemassas, Senegal (62,000 BP – 25,000 BP), Birimi, Ghana (50,000 BP – 20,000 BP), Missira (MIS 4), Toumboura, Senegal (33,000 BP), Laminia, Gambia (24,000 BP – 21,000 BP), Ndiayène Pendao, Senegal (11,600 BP), and Saxonomunya (11,000 BP), near Falémé, Mali. There is also scant evidence of Middle Stone Age dwelling at Ounjougou, Mali between 191,000 BP – 130,000 BP.

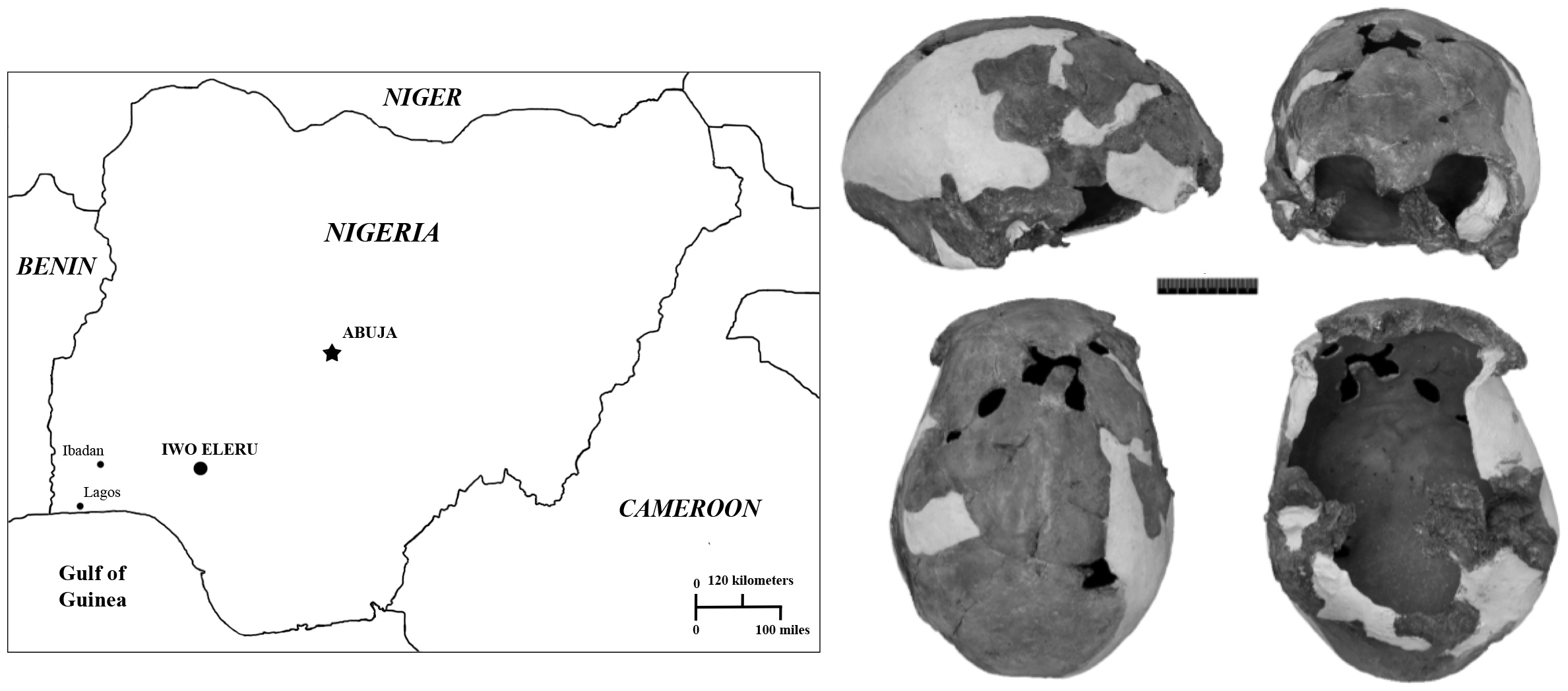
Iwo Eleru site and Iwo Eleru skull

Aside the scant evidence, Middle Stone Age West Africans likely dwelled continuously in West Africa between MIS 4 and MIS 2, and likely were not present in West Africa before MIS 5. Amid MIS 5, Middle Stone Age West Africans may have migrated across the West Sudanian savanna and continued to reside in the region (e.g., West Sudanian savanna, West African Sahel). In the Late Pleistocene, Middle Stone Age West Africans began to dwell along parts of the forest and coastal region of West Africa (e.g., Tiemassas, Senegal). More specifically, by at least 61,000 BP, Middle Stone Age West Africans may have begun to migrate south of the West Sudanian savanna, and, by at least 25,000 BP, may have begun to dwell near the coast of West Africa. Amid aridification in MIS 5 and regional change of climate in MIS 4, in the Sahara and the Sahel, Aterians may have migrated southward into West Africa (e.g., Baie du Levrier, Mauritania; Tiemassas, Senegal; Lower Senegal River Valley).

In 35,000 BP, Middle Stone Age West Africans and West African archaic humans are presumed to have admixed with one another, resulting in the development of the Iwo Eleru people (e.g., Iwo Eleru skull), who may have remained isolated in West Africa, and thus distinct from both contemporaneous Africans in the Sahara and from any other African populations amid the transitory period between the Pleistocene and Holocene.

Earlier than 32,000 BP, or by 30,000 BP, Late Stone Age West African hunter-gatherers were living in the forests of western Central Africa (e.g., earlier than 32,000 BP at de Maret in Shum Laka, 12,000 BP at Mbi Crater). An excessively dry Ogolian period occurred, spanning from 20,000 BP to 12,000 BP. By 15,000 BP, the number of settlements made by Middle Stone Age West Africans decreased due to the increasingly humid conditions, expansion of the West African forest, and greater the number of settlements made by Late Stone Age West African hunter-gatherers. Macrolith-using late Middle Stone Age peoples (e.g., the possibly archaic human admixed or late-persisting early modern human Iwo Eleru fossils of the late Middle Stone Age), who dwelled in Central Africa, western Central Africa, and West Africa, were displaced by microlith-using Late Stone Age Africans (e.g., non-archaic human admixed Late Stone Age Shum Laka fossils dated between 7000 BP and 3000 BP) as they migrated from Central Africa, to western Central Africa, into West Africa. Between 16,000 BP and 12,000 BP, Late Stone Age West Africans began dwelling in the eastern and central forested regions (e.g., Ghana, Ivory Coast, Nigeria; between 18,000 BP and 13,000 BP at Temet West and Asokrochona in the southern region of Ghana, 13,050 ± 230 BP at Bingerville in the southern region of Ivory Coast, 11,200 ± 200 BP at Iwo Eleru in Nigeria) of West Africa. By 11,000 BP, the late settlement made by Middle Stone Age West Africans and earliest settlement made by Late Stone Age West African hunter-gatherers emerged in the westernmost region (e.g., Falémé Valley, Senegal) of West Africa. Middle Stone Age West Africans and Late Stone Age West African hunter-gatherers probably did not become admixed with one another and were culturally and ecologically distinct from one another.

=== Holocene ===
Between 12,000 BP and 8000 BP, West African hunter-gatherers then likely migrated from coastal West Africa, toward the north in West Africa (as far as Mali, Burkina Faso, and Mauritania), as evidenced by their microlithic industries (e.g., quartz, sandstone). Amid the early period of the Holocene, West African hunter-gatherers may have had Sahelian stone industries, from Senegal to Niger, which derived either from a distinct Sub-Saharan African stone tradition, or from the Shum Laka stone tradition of Cameroon.

In the 10th millennium BCE, Niger-Congo speakers developed pyrotechnology and employed subsistence strategy at Ounjougou, Mali. Prior to 9400 BCE, Niger-Congo speakers independently created and used matured ceramic technology (e.g., pottery, pots) to contain and cook grains (e.g., Digitaria exilis, pearl millet); ethnographically and historically, West African women have been the creators of pottery in most West African ceramic traditions and their production of ceramics is closely associated with creativity and fertility. Amid the tenth millennium BCE, microlith-using West Africans migrated into and dwelt in Ounjougou alongside earlier residing West Africans in Ounjougou. Among two existing cultural areas, earlier residing West Africans in Ounjougou were of a cultural area encompassing the Sahara region (e.g., Tenere, Niger/Chad; Aïr Mountains, Niger; Acacus Mountains, Libya/Algeria; Tagalagal, Niger; Temet, Niger) of Africa and microlith-using West Africans were of a cultural area encompassing the forest region of West Africa.

Following northward expansion from coastal West Africa refugia, West African hunter-gatherers arrived and began dwelling at Korounkorokale, in Pays Mande, Mali, where they engaged in hunting and fishing. By 4000 BCE, red ocher, used to paint pottery, jewelry, or pictographs, was developed by West African hunter-gatherers, which may have developed as a result of interaction with populations from lake areas to the northeast. With the increased use of grinded stones, and thus, cultural development of utilizing vegetation for food, this resulted in a decreased use of stone projectiles, and thus, decreased hunting cultural practices. By 700 CE, along with Niani having been established, Korounkorokale was embedded within the Kingdom of Kangaba. West African hunter-gatherers and their ancient cultural traditions may have persisted shortly thereafter, as West African hunter-gatherers became fully acculturated, and Malinke metallurgy and pottery traditions became predominant.

By 4000 BP, interaction between Saharan occupants and Sub-Saharan West African hunter-gatherers increased as Saharan occupants increasingly migrated southward into Sub-Saharan West Africa. As desertification was underway, West African hunter-gatherers of the Middle Niger were likely the first to encounter southward migrating Saharan occupants. Increased interaction may have resulted in the adoption of pottery and polished stone production, which, subsequently, may have led to these cultural practices being further diffused unto other West African hunter-gatherers. Additionally, pastoralism may have been adopted by some West African hunter-gatherers. As West African hunter-gatherers of the Middle Niger became increasingly acculturated and eventually admixed into more numerous, surrounding southward migrating Saharan occupants, some West African hunter-gatherers, further south, may have continued their hunting-gathering and/or basic vegetable cultivation cultures. Eventually, even these socially organized West African hunter-gatherers, were likely acculturated and admixed into the more numerous, surrounding West Africans from the Sahara.

Amid the middle of the Holocene, West African hunter-gatherers continued to dwell along the rivers and within the forests of coastal West Africa. West African hunter-gatherer stone industries had little presence to the north of the West Sudanian savanna and Sahel boundary, which may indicate that it served as a type of natural environmental barricade to their greatly mobile hunter-gatherer lifestyle. Increased use of ceramics among West African hunter-gatherers also occurred, as evidenced by ceramics dated to 5370 ± 100 BP in Bosumpra Cave, Ghana and ceramics dated to 4180 ± 160 BP in Mbi Crater, Cameroon. While likely still maintaining their hunter-gatherer culture, West African hunter-gatherers may have increasingly utilized local flora (e.g., palm oil, tubers).

Desertification of the Green Sahara (4000 BP – 3500 BP) resulted in the migration of Saharan pastoralists and agropastoralists south of the Sahelian region. Consequently, seasonal interaction likely occurred between Saharan pastoralists and agropastoralists and West African hunter-gatherers, who also practiced basic agriculture via vegetable cultivation. Sites in Ghana (e.g., Ntereso, Kintampo, Daboya) provide an example of group contact in 3500 BP, as evidenced by Punpun microlithic industries that appear in close proximity to Saharan projectile points, beads, stone innovations (e.g., stone arm rings, small stone axes), and livestock. Rather than Saharan pastoralists and agropastoralists replacing West African hunter-gatherers, there apparently was a merger of groups, as at Kintampo, there was evidence of adaptation to the subsistence conditions of the forest-savanna region of West Africa.

Domesticated crops (e.g., pearl millet, cowpea, large amounts of oil palm) and undomesticated flora were availed in rockshelters (e.g., B-sites, K6), near the Guinean forest-savanna mosaic, in the southern region of central Ghana. West African agriculturalists of Kintampo and West African hunter-gatherers of Punpun were migratory peoples, who settled at the sites seasonally for various reasons (e.g., oil palm production); this is evidenced by the varied way in which flora are situated at the rockshelters. West African hunter-gatherers may have migrated southward near the forest region or scattered into smaller groups amid arid seasons.

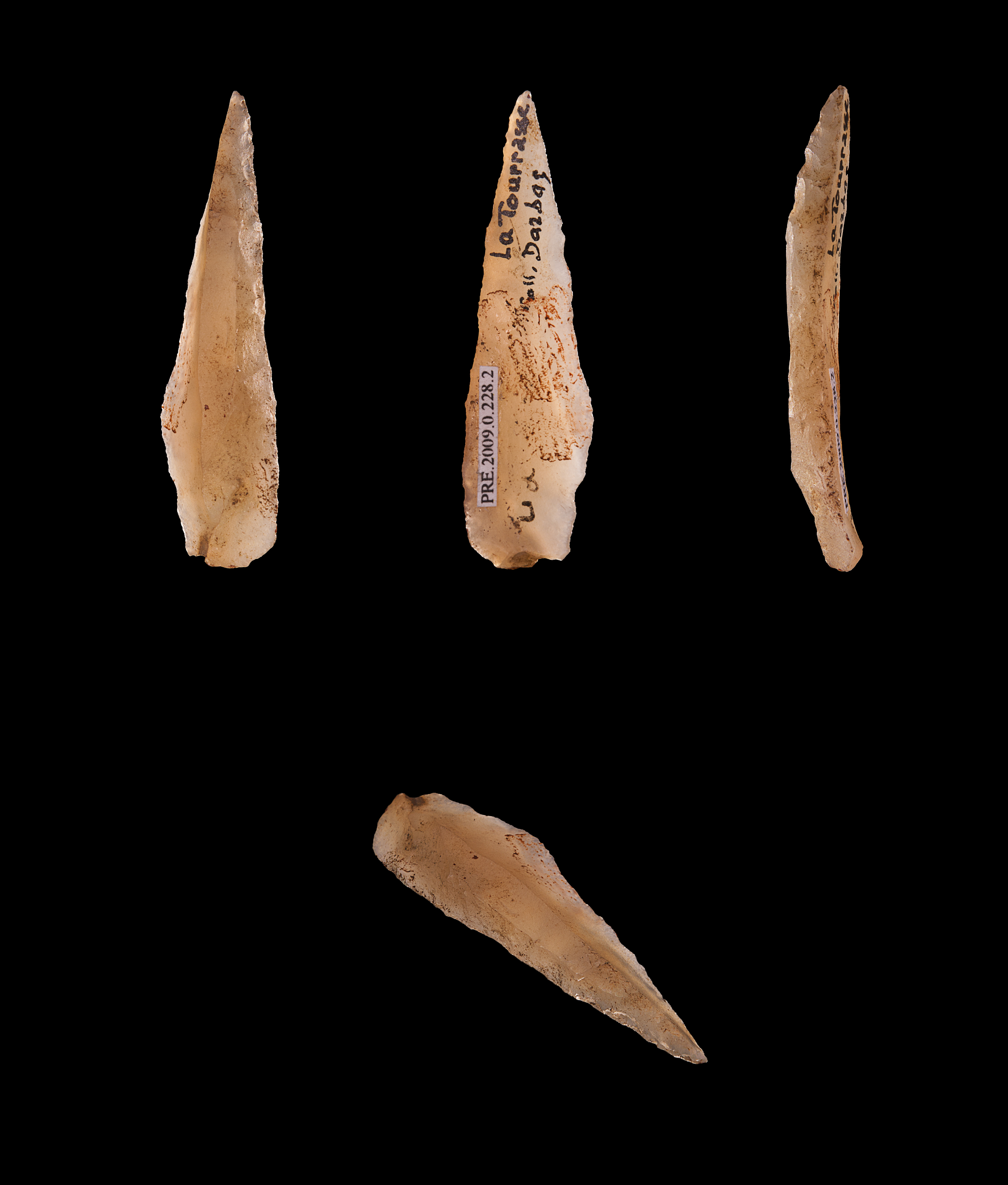
A microlith projectile point, a very small stone tool

Various activities (e.g., production of local resources) occurred in partially settled areas of the savanna and forest regions. After 4500 BP, desertification may have resulted in Saharan peoples migrating toward the south. The southern parts of the forest region, near Kintampo, may have been unfit for the subsistence techniques of farming domesticated crops (e.g., pearl millet) from the region of northern Africa. As a result, subsistence techniques were adapted to the natural environment of the forest region, and local crops (e.g., oil palm, yams), may have been introduced into what was usually farmed. Successful adaptation to the local ecology seems to have occurred, from the southern part of the forest region to the coastal region of West Africa.

West African agriculturalists likely formed mutual relations with the West African hunter-gatherers. As a result of these relations, West African hunter-gatherers likely provided West African agriculturalists with oil-rich and Vitamin A-rich nuts as part of their local food source. Additionally, West African agriculturalists may have acquired forest subsistence knowledge and strategies from West African hunter-gatherers.

With exception to some parts of West Africa (e.g., Ntereso, Kintampo), prior to late first millennium BCE, West African hunter-gatherers, who were the most widely spread cultural group of socially organized populations, were likely the only group to populate the forest and savanna regions of West Africa. The expansion of West African hunter-gatherers north, toward the Sahelian region of the Middle Niger, led to interaction with populations from further north. Prior to initial encounter with migrating populations from further north, West African hunter-gatherers may have already engaged in basic agricultural production of tubers as well as utilizing Elaeis guineensis and Canarium schweinfurthii. After interaction began, some West African hunter-gatherers may have acquired knowledge of pottery and polished stone production, which then spread further southward onto other West African hunter-gatherers, while others may have acquired knowledge of pastoralism. Continued interaction may have resulted in further acculturation (e.g., loss of West African hunter-gatherer languages).

Isolated groups of West African hunter-gatherers may have continually dwelled throughout the region of the Pays Mande mountains after the development of metallurgy. West African hunter-gatherers may have even adopted, culturally adapted metallurgical practices, while still maintaining their ancient stone industrial traditions. Cultural continuity, via stone industries of isolated West African hunter-gatherers from the forest-savanna region, has been found throughout West Africa as late as the end of first millennium CE. Kamabai Shelter, in Sierra Leone, had quartz microliths dated to 1190 ± 95 BP. In Mali, quartz microliths were dated to 1430 ± 80 BP in Nyamanko and dated to 1020 ± 105 BP in Korounkorokale. Kariya Wuro, in Nigeria, had quartz microliths dated to 950 ± 30 BP. After having persisted as late as the end of first millennium CE, or 1000 BP, many of the remaining West African hunter-gatherers were likely ultimately acculturated and admixed into larger groups of West African agriculturalists, akin to the migratory Bantu-speaking agriculturalists and their encounters with Central African hunter-gatherers.

== History ==
According to early European literature of the 16th century CE, West African pygmies dwelled throughout West Africa (e.g., Cameroon, Sierra Leone, Liberia).

In 1500 CE, when the Dogon people entered the Bandiagara Cliffs, they encountered West African pygmies known as the Tellem.

== Oral Traditions About West African Hunter-Gatherers ==
Mande (e.g., Soninke, Malinke) peoples and Dogon people had oral traditions of West African pygmies (e.g., Tellem). For the Dogon, even before the Tellem, there were groups (e.g., Yeban, Andoumboulou) that were even more ancient. Water-based economic (e.g., fishing) peoples (e.g., Bozo, Sorkawa), who are reputed to be one of the Niger River's first settlers, recognized that there were even earlier settled peoples – "red men."

The oral history among numerous modern West Africans is that their ancestors were West African pygmies. Among the Sousou, in Guinea, West African pygmies were known as the Doki. Among the Wolof, West African pygmies were known as Kondrong, who lived in the forest region. Among the Malinke, West African pygmies were known as Komo Koudoumi. Among peoples in Liberia, West African pygmies were known as Jinna.

Among modern West Africans (e.g., Mende of Sierra Leone, Guere of Ivory Coast), there is oral history of their ancestors encountering West African pygmies. Given the varying heights among modern West Africans who dwell within the forest region, this may indicate that admixing had occurred between West African pygmies and the southward migrating ancestors of modern West Africans incoming from the savanna region.

== Languages ==
West African hunter-gatherers may have spoken a set of presently extinct Sub-Saharan West African languages. In the northeastern region of Nigeria, Jalaa, a language isolate, may have been a descendant language from the original set(s) of languages spoken by West African pygmies.

== Ancient DNA ==
=== Cameroon ===
Ancient DNA was able to be obtained from two Shum Laka foragers from the early period of the Stone to Metal Age, in 8000 BP, and two Shum Laka foragers from the late period of the Stone to Metal Age, in 3000 BP.

The mitochondrial DNA and Y-Chromosome haplogroups found in the ancient Shum Laka foragers were Sub-Saharan African haplogroups. Two earlier Shum Laka foragers were of haplogroup L0a2a1 – broadly distributed throughout modern African populations – and two later Shum Laka foragers were of haplogroup L1c2a1b – distributed among both modern West and Central African agriculturalists and hunter-gatherers. One earlier Shum Laka forager was of haplogroup B and one later Shum Laka forager haplogroup B2b, which, together, as macrohaplogroup B, is distributed among modern Central African hunter-gatherers (e.g., Baka, Bakola, Biaka, Bedzan).

The autosomal admixture of the four ancient Shum Laka forager children was ~35% Western Central African hunter-gatherer and ~65% Basal West African – or, an admixture composed of a modern western Central African hunter-gatherer component, a modern West African component, existing locally before 8000 BP, and a modern East African/West African component likely from further north in the regions of the Sahel and Sahara.

The two earlier Shum Laka foragers from 8000 BP and two later Shum Laka foragers from 3000 BP show 5000 years of population continuity in region. Yet, modern peoples of Cameroon are more closely related to modern West Africans than to the ancient Shum Laka foragers. Modern Cameroonian hunter-gatherers, while partly descended, are not largely descended from the Shum Laka foragers, due to the apparent absence of descent from Basal West Africans.

The Bantu expansion is hypothesized to have originated in a homeland of Bantu-speaking peoples located around western Cameroon, a part of which Shum Laka is viewed as being of importance in the early period of this expansion. By 3000 BP, the Bantu expansion is hypothesized to have already begun. Yet, the sampled ancient Shum Laka foragers – two from 8000 BP and two from 3000 BP – show that most modern Niger-Congo speakers are greatly distinct from the ancient Shum Laka foragers, thus, showing that the ancient Shum Laka foragers were not the ancestral source population for modern Bantu-speaking peoples.

While Southern African hunter-gatherers are generally recognized as being the earliest divergent modern human group, having diverged from other groups around 250,000 BP - 200,000 BP, as a result of the sampling of the ancient Shum Laka foragers, Central African hunter-gatherers are shown to have likely diverged at a similar time, if not even earlier.
