= Lengo Petroglyphs =

The ancient rock art site of Lengo is located in the Bakouma region of the Central African Republic.

== Site Description ==
The village of Lengo is on the road of Yalinga 3 km from Bakouma. The site of engravings is located on the right of this road, in 1 km east of the village. It occupies a huge laterite slab, more than 200 m long covered by a layer of topsoil brought by erosion and decomposition of vegetation. They number more than 500 pictorials.

Engravings become divided into three groups:

- Animals
- Weapons
- Various other signs.

A census revealed the following drawing types and abundances: Animals:

- Eight antelopes, the nicest measure 1.50 m of long; very close to its back are engraved a spear and two throwing knives; two others are of lesser quality.
- Feline, two with round heads and raised long tail.
- Five very stylized and badly preserved animals, impossible to identify.
- Two birds of good size, perhaps bustards in mating positions.

Human playing bit parts: A figure having moved aside legs, massive and short trunk on which arms are pointed out by two traits; it has a very small head of bird which, according to information acquired on place would be a ritual mask. The outlines of this silhouette are given by a polished, broad but rather shallow trait.

Weapon and various objects: The presentations of weapons are the most numerous:

- Sixteen spears with very long shafts.
- An arrow with a short shaft.
- Four twenty-one throwing knives where they can identify thirty different types. Some people are very simple, right and bent back, others contrariwise in the numerous branches show an ornamental or ritual research and carry curls, hooks and notches. They are for the majority more complex.
- A calabash provided with a rope forming a curl. The inside of the drawings is finely staked out, the well marked neck and outlines were carried out by a carefully polished trait. This domestic object serves even in the region of Bakouma for the transport and the conservation of water at present in small quantity.

== World Heritage Status ==
This site was added to the UNESCO World Heritage Tentative List on April 11, 2006 in the Cultural category.
