= Shum Laka =

Archaeological site in Cameroon

- Shum Laka Archaeological Site
- 5°51′31″N 10°4′40″E
- Location: Bamenda, Cameroon

The archaeological site of Shum Laka is the most prominent rockshelter site in the Grasslands region of the Laka Valley, northwest Cameroon. Occupations at this rockshelter date to the Later Stone Age. This region is important to investigations of the development and subsequent diffusion of Bantu-speaking peoples. The site of Shum Laka is located approximately 15 kilometers from the town of Bamenda, and it resides on the inner wall of the Bafochu Mbu caldera. The deposits at Shum Laka include each phase of cultural development in the Grasslands.

== Archaeology ==
=== Geoarchaeology of Shum Laka ===
The rockshelter itself at Shum Laka is approximately 50 meters wide at its greatest point and 20 meters deep. Stratigraphic dating of surface and near surface deposits support occupations as early as 30,000 BP. Geomorphological analysis determined that the rockshelter had been subjected to alluvial depositional events during the Holocene, but archaeological deposits remained mostly intact and in situ. Fluvial erosional processes at the site were determined to have had their greatest impact laterally, and thus not damaged contextual integrity between cultural occupations. The importance of geoarchaeological investigations conducted at Shum Laka includes the construction of a reliable cultural chronology of the area, and an emphasis on the need to critically evaluate other rockshelter sites in the region.

=== Archaeological deposits ===
At Shum Laka, over 1,000 ceramic sherds, nearly 500,000 pieces of lithic materials, and 18 human skeletons were recovered. Radiocarbon dating of the bone and plant remains recovered demonstrated multiple occupations spanning from 30,000 BP to around 400 BP. Bone preservation from the early occupations is poor, with only a few surviving faunal remains and no bone tools. Later occupations depict common exploitation of medium-sized fauna from the forest. These remains include those from several gorillas and chimpanzees, and various artiodactyla. Based upon the small amounts of materials found in individual strata, it is proposed that the site was occupied for numerous short periods of time. Macrobotanical remains recovered were originally claimed to include both savanna grasses and forest trees, but the source wrongly cited a montane forest herb, Hypericum, as a savanna grass. These were interpreted as meaning that for a period of occupation during the Holocene, Shum Laka was located within an ecotone. Ceramic assemblages recovered from the site date from 7000 BP onward and are indicative of continued longer occupation by semi-agricultural populations. Additionally, these ceramic assemblages indicate the use of the rockshelter by different groups of peoples and that these people interacted with various western African states.

=== Lithic assemblage and environmental variability ===
The lithic assemblage in some of the late Pleistocene occupations at Shum Laka are unique in the presence of a quartz industry early than most other sites in the region. The presence of a microlithic quartz industry at Shum Laka, when combined with supporting evidence from other rockshelter and late Pleistocene sites in the Grasslands, is indicative of a more mobile population that exploited a variety of resources in the ecotonal landscape. This behavioral strategy is ascribed as an adaptation to common regional environmental changes during the late Pleistocene. It is well established that the late Pleistocene in northern Cameroon and the surrounding area was highly variable climatically. Particularly during the Last Glacial Maximum, refuge occupations by people would have been short-term and highly variable based on rapid, localized changes. Similar lithic assemblages and strategies as those found at Shum Laka have been delineated at other rockshelter sites in the area dating to the same period.

== Genetics ==
=== Ancient DNA ===
Geneticists sequenced genome-wide DNA data from four Shum Laka foragers buried at the site of Shum Laka in Cameroon between 8000–3000 years ago. One individual 2/SEII carried the deeply divergent haplogroup A00 found at low frequencies among some present-day Niger-Congo speakers, but the genome-wide ancestry profiles for all four individuals are very different from the majority of West Africans today and instead are more similar to West-Central African hunter-gatherers. Despite the geographic proximity of Shum Laka to the hypothesized birthplace of Bantu languages and the temporal range of the samples bookending the initial Bantu expansion, these individuals are not representative of a Bantu source population. Phylogenetic model including Shum Laka features three major radiations within Africa: one phase early in the history of modern humans, one close to the time of the migration giving rise to non-Africans, and one in the past several thousand years. Present-day West Africans and some East Africans, in addition to Central and Southern African hunter-gatherers, retain ancestry from the first phase, which is therefore still represented throughout the majority of human diversity in Africa today.

== World Heritage status ==
This site was added to the UNESCO World Heritage Tentative List on February 2, 2018 in the Cultural category.
