= Kola people =

Pygmy ethnic group of the Gabon–Congo border area

The Kola people, Bakola, also known as the Koya, Bakoya, are pygmies of the NE Gabon–Congo border area. They speak the Bantu Ngom language.

They are distinct from the Gyele people of coastal Cameroon, a subgroup of which also goes by the name Bakola / Bakoya.
