= Samun Dukiya =

Coordinates: 9.0833°N 8.0000°E

Samun Dukiya is an archeological site in Nigeria in the Nok valley where artifacts from the Nok culture have been found, dating to between 300 BC and 100 BC.

Radiocarbon dating indicates that the site was occupied between 2500 and 2000 years ago. No traces of occupation before the Iron Age have been found. The site contained broken pottery, iron and other artifacts, and fragments of terracotta statues which may have been used in shrines. Angela Fagg, daughter of the archeologist Bernard Fagg, has discovered parts of earthenware figurines and pottery, shaped stone implements including a stone axe and a large deeply grooved stone. She also found many pieces of iron objects including hooks, bracelets, knife fragments, arrowheads, spearheads and a cylinder made from a rolled metal band. The iron slag has been dated to around 210 BC.

Although part of the same artistic tradition, there are stylistic differences between the domestic pottery found in Samun Dukiya and that of other Nok sites at Taruga and Katsina-Ala. It seems probable that the overall Nok style was adopted by various farming communities of different peoples, rather than being the work of one people.
