= Margaret Plass =

Anthropologist and collector (1896–1990)

Margaret Plass MBE (1896–1990) was an American anthropologist, collector of African artefacts and patron of the British Museum alongside her husband, Webster Plass.

== Early life and marriage ==
Margaret Barton Feurer was born in 1896 in Haverford, Pennsylvania, to the wealthy amateur archaeologist Carl Feurer and his wife, Margaret Barton. She was sometimes nicknamed "Margot". She attended Friends' Central School in Wynnewood, Pennsylvania and went on to graduate in 1917 from Bryn Mawr College, having majored in Classics and History of Art. She served in the United States Navy Reserve during the First World War. It was through the Naval Reserve that she met and married Webster Plass (1895-1952) in 1920, four months after meeting him. Walter Plass was employed as a consulting engineer for some US oil companies, such as the Sharpless Company, so the couple spent the first sixteen years of their marriage travelling in Africa and Asia for Plass' work. They travelled to Colombia, Curaçao, Guatemala, India, Malaysia, Mexico, Mozambique, South Africa, Peru, Chile, Mexico, Brazil, China, Japan, India, California, Canton, Indochina, the Belgian Congo and Tunisia. They also travelled to Nazi Germany in 1938. They began collecting art and artefacts from various Indigenous African cultures during this time. The extensive collection of photographs the couple took during their travels is now available for study at the Bryn Mawr College archive, alongside Plass' correspondence and numerous mementos from her travels which she bequeathed to her old college in her will.

== Career ==
After her husband's death on 16 Aug 1952, Plass began pursuing her Anthropological work more seriously. She donated most of their large collection of African art and objects to the British Museum and a collection of 21 swords from Japan and the Middle East. She also donated some pieces to LaSalle College, Bryn Mawr College, Oberlin College and Penn Museum, as well as selling some at auction. She studied anthropology at the University of Pennsylvania, and the University of Malaya and carried out nine more trips to Africa to study and collect more artworks. Her closest associate during this time was William Buller Fagg (1914-1992), an anthropological curator for the British Museum. He later wrote her obituary in 1990 and affectionately described their first meeting in the basement of the British Museum in 1946. She became a Fellow of the Royal Anthropological Institute, London, as well as an Honorary Curator in the Ethnography Department at the British Museum and Research Associate at the University Museum of the University of Pennsylvania. She wrote articles with Fagg on Indigenous art from Benin, Liberia and Mali, as well as the European tradition of saltcellar. Plass was awarded an OBE in 1967 and died in 1990.
