= Bura culture =

Coordinates: 13.8333°N 0.5000°E

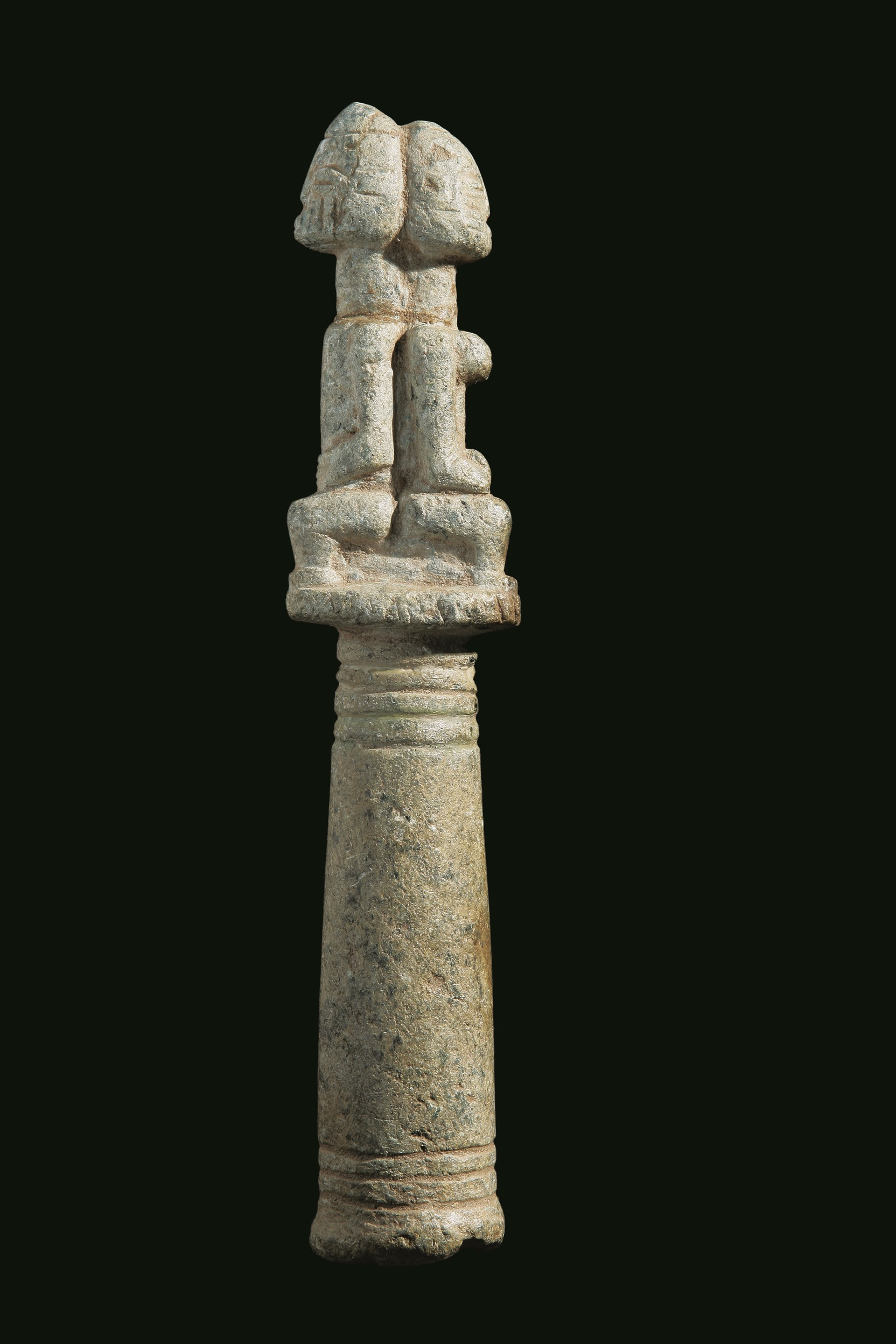
Stone sculpture of the Bura culture, Niger

The Bura culture (Bura system) refers to a set of archeological sites in the lower Niger River valley of Niger and Burkina Faso. More specifically, the Iron Age civilization exemplified by the Bura culture was centered in the southwest portion of modern-day Niger and in the southeast part of contemporary Burkina Faso (formerly known as Upper Volta).

Iron industry, in both smelting and forging for tools and weapons, had developed in West Africa by 1200 BC. The first-millennium Bura-Asinda culture in the West African Sahel has been radiocarbon dated as starting in the 3rd century AD and lasting until the 13th century. But very little is precisely understood about this "shadowy" and "mysterious" civilization and its culture because it was discovered only a few decades ago in 1975; and it was not until 1983 that the first archeological excavation was commenced.

Named for the Bura archeological site near Bura in southwest Niger, the Bura culture produced a variety of distinctive artifacts made of clay, iron and stone. Along with nearby terracotta jars used in ritual sacrifice, hooked arrowheads made of iron were also found. Beads made of quartzite, nose rings made from brass, and bracelets made from iron or brass were found on human remains located beneath the terracotta jars. Within the region of the Niger River basin, the Bura culture produced the earliest terracotta equestrian statuettes.

However, it is not yet known how the entire Bura system linked up to other ancient African cultures and to such later Islamic-influenced Sahelian kingdoms as Ghana, early Mali, later Mali, or Songhai. The terracotta urns of the Bura culture, which were used for funerary purposes, may be related to the Tondidarou megaliths.

== See also ==
- History of Africa (emphasises the pre-colonial civilisations)
  - Ancient African history (emphasises northeast Africa)
  - History of West Africa (a brief summary)
- Nigerien culture—that is, the contemporary Culture of Niger
- Burkinabé culture—that is, the contemporary Culture of Burkina Faso
