= Nok culture =

Ancient civilization of Nigeria

Coordinates: 9°30′N 8°0′E

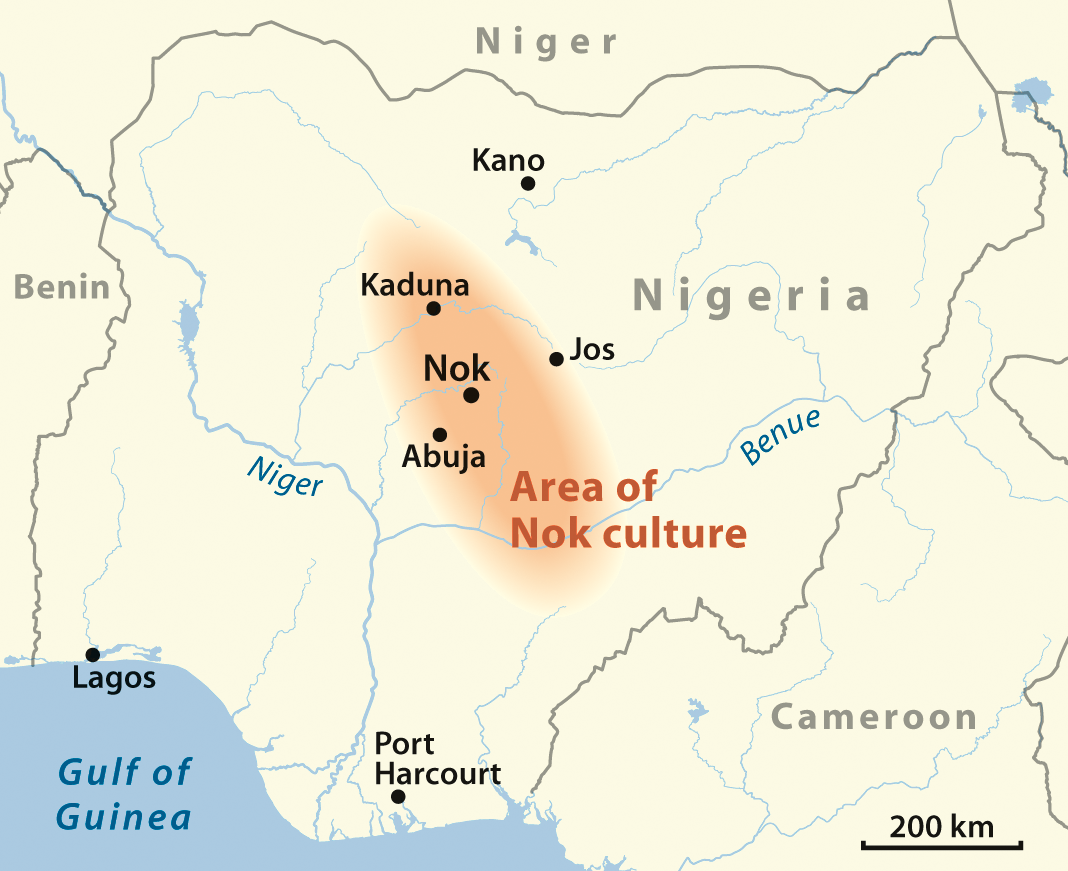
- Geographical range: West Africa
- Period: Neolithic, Iron Age
- Dates: c. 1500 BC — c. 1 BC
- Type site: Nok
- Major sites: Nok village; Jama'a; Samun Dukiya; Taruga; Jos
- Followed by: Kwararafa

The Nok culture is a population whose material remains are named after the Ham village of Nok in southern Kaduna State of Nigeria, where their terracotta sculptures were first discovered in 1928. The Nok people and the Gajiganna people may have migrated from the Central Sahara, along with pearl millet and pottery, and diverged prior to arriving in the northern region of modern-day Nigeria. This may have led to their respective settlements in the regions of Gajiganna and Nok. Nok people may have also migrated from the West African Sahel to the region of Nok. Nok culture may have emerged in 1500 BCE and continued to persist until 1 BCE.

Nok people may have developed terracotta sculptures, through large-scale economic production, as part of a complex funerary culture that may have included practices such as feasting. The earliest Nok terracotta sculptures may have developed in 900 BCE. Some Nok terracotta sculptures portray figures wielding slingshots, as well as bows and arrows, which may be indicative of Nok people engaging in the hunting, or trapping, of undomesticated animals. A Nok sculpture portrays two individuals, along with their goods, in a dugout canoe. Both of the anthropomorphic figures in the watercraft are paddling. The Nok terracotta depiction of a dugout canoe may indicate that Nok people used dugout canoes to transport cargo, along tributaries (e.g., Gurara River) of the Niger River, and exchanged them in a regional trade network. The Nok terracotta depiction of a figure with a seashell on its head may indicate that the span of these riverine trade routes may have extended to the Atlantic coast. In the maritime history of Africa, there is the earlier Dufuna canoe, which was constructed approximately 8000 years ago in the northern region of Nigeria; as the second earliest form of water vessel known in Sub-Saharan Africa, the Nok terracotta depiction of a dugout canoe was created in the central region of Nigeria during the first millennium BCE. As part of Nok traditional medicine, Nok ceramics may have been used to process roots and bark as medicinal plants for the production of medicinal decoctions.

Excluding ancient Egyptian figurative art, Nok sculptures are regarded to be the earliest examples of large three-dimensional (sculptural) figurative art in continental Africa. Latter artistic traditions of West Africa – Bura of Niger (3rd century CE – 10th century CE), Koma of Ghana (7th century CE – 15th century CE), Igbo-Ukwu of Nigeria (9th century CE – 10th century CE), Jenne-Jeno of Mali (11th century CE – 12th century CE), and Ile Ife of Nigeria (11th century CE – 15th century CE) – may have been shaped by the earlier West African clay terracotta tradition of the Nok culture. Nok settlement sites are often found on mountaintops. Iron metallurgy may have independently developed in the Nok culture between 750 BCE and 550 BCE.

== Origin ==
Breunig and Rupp (2016) stated: "Their origin is unknown, but since the plants they used as crops (especially millet) are indigenous to the Sahel region, a northern homeland is more probable than any other." Breunig (2017) expounded: "The people of the Nok culture must have come from somewhere else. So far, however, we have not found out what region, though we suspect the Sahel zone in West Africa." Champion et al. (2022) suggested that they may have come from the Central Sahara, and stated:

The cultivation of pearl millet diffused from the desiccating West and Central Sahara into the West African savanna zone after 2500 BCE, in the context of southwards population movements (Ozainne et al. 2014; Neumann 2018; Fuller et al. 2021)…The presence of pearl millet without roulette decorations or chaff temper, as seen in the Nok and early Gajiganna sites, suggests that the third diffusion originated directly from the central Sahara and possibly split before reaching northern Nigeria, accounting for the differences in Nok and Gajiganna pottery (Fig. 8; and see Champion 2020, p. 462).

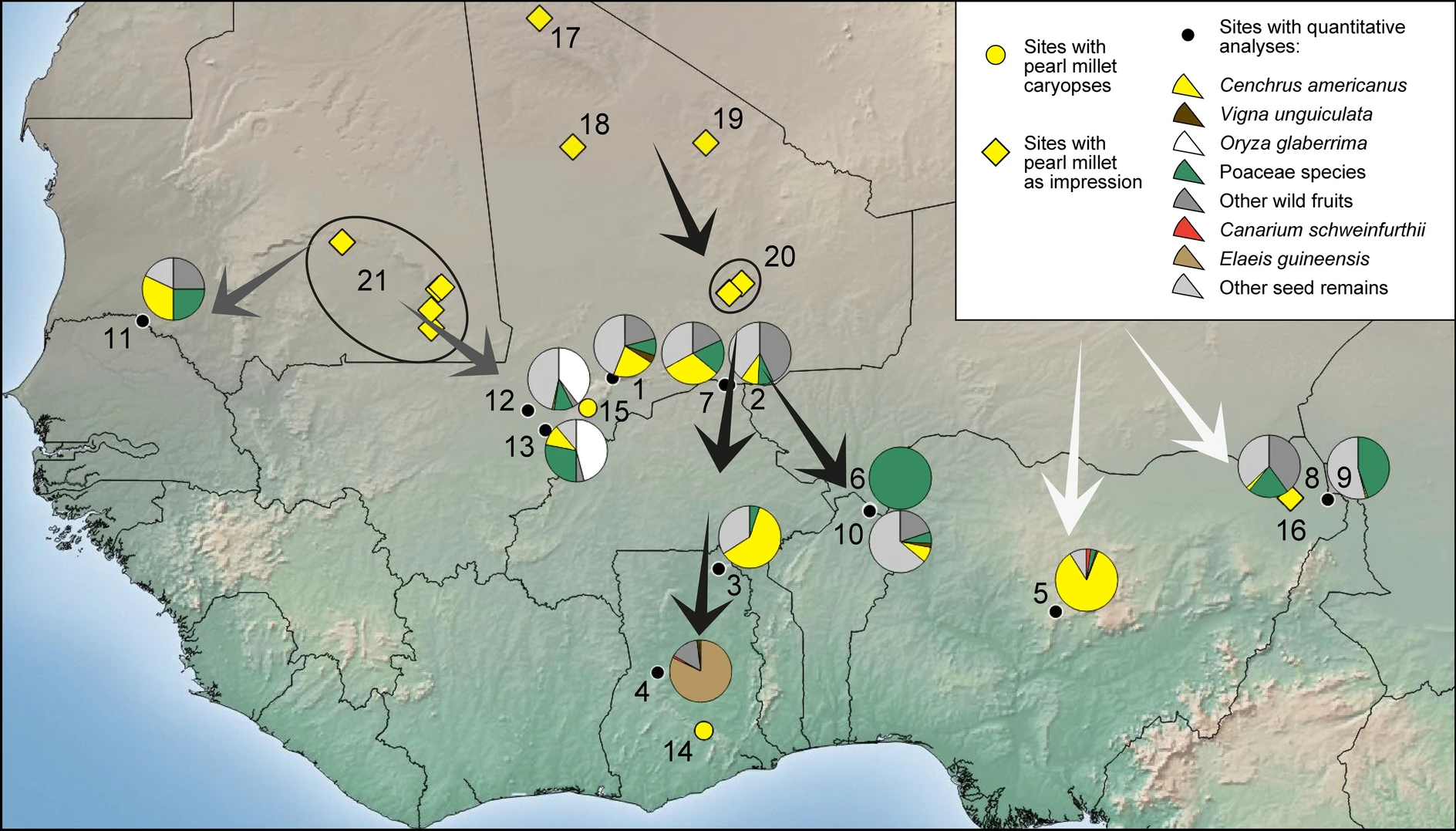
West African sites with archaeobotanical remains from third to first millennium cal bc. The arrows indicate directions of pearl millet diffusion into sub-Saharan West Africa, including 5. Nok region sites.

== Archaeology ==
The first Nok terracotta was discovered in 1928 by Colonel Dent Young, a co-owner of a mining partnership, near the village of Nok in Kaduna State, Nigeria. The terracotta was accidentally unearthed at a level of 24 feet (7 m) from an alluvial tin mine. Young presented the sculptures to the Museum of the Department of Mines in Jos.

Fifteen years later, in 1943 near the village of Nok, in the center of Nigeria, a new series of clay figurines were discovered by accident while mining tin. A clerk in charge of the mine had found a head and had taken it back to his home for use as a scarecrow, a role that it filled (successfully) for a year in a yam field. This scarecrow was eventually noticed by Bernard Fagg who at the time was an administrative officer who had studied archaeology at the University of Cambridge. Fagg noticed that the head on the scarecrow looked similar to the sculpture that Young had found. He traveled to Jos where Young showed Fagg other recently uncovered terracotta figures. Eventually it became clear that the tin mining in Nok and Jema'a areas was revealing and destroying archaeological material.

Map of Nigeria showing the major sites of the Nok culture (clickable map)

Preliminary excavations at the beginning of January 1961 began near a remote valley named Taruga near the village of Takushara. The trial excavations took place during a period of eight days. The finds included objects of wrought iron, a quantity of iron slag, fragments of tuyere, pottery, figurine fragments, red ocher, quartz hammer-stones, and small concentrations of charcoal. The most famous finds at the site were the pottery graters which were shallow, flat-bottomed dishes which were deeply scored inside with diced patterns to produce a sharp abrasive surface. These pottery graters were probably used for food preparation. In the preliminary excavation a proton magnetometer survey was used to try and locate furnaces. The survey revealed a total of 61 magnetic anomalies which were mostly located in a flat, central area which probably indicated the limits of actual occupation. Twenty of the anomalies revealed concentrations of slag and nine of them contained in situ structures of furnace walls and bases. The most common type of artefact found was domestic pottery which can be divided into two different types. One type are bowls or shallow basins without lips and the other are globular pots which have everted lips. Because of this preliminary excavation, the Nok Culture would start being regarded as belonging to the Iron Age.

In 1989, German scientists were working in northeastern Nigeria's Chad Basin as part of a cooperative project between the University of Maiduguri located in Borno State, Nigeria, and archaeologists of Goethe University Frankfurt. This project examined the beginnings of sedentary farming societies in the Chad Basin. Questions arose about whether there were other societies like those in the Chad Basin, and these questions led the team to investigate the Nok Culture. In the early steps of the Frankfurt Nok Project, researchers had difficulty finding sites to excavate. The team began collaborating with Umaru Yusuf Potiskum and they started finding distinct Nok culture sites, although most had been looted. Scientific field work began in 2005 to systematically investigate Nok archaeological sites and to better understand Nok terracotta sculptures within their Iron Age archaeological context, and was subsequently concluded in 2021.

=== Sculptures ===
Nok sculptures

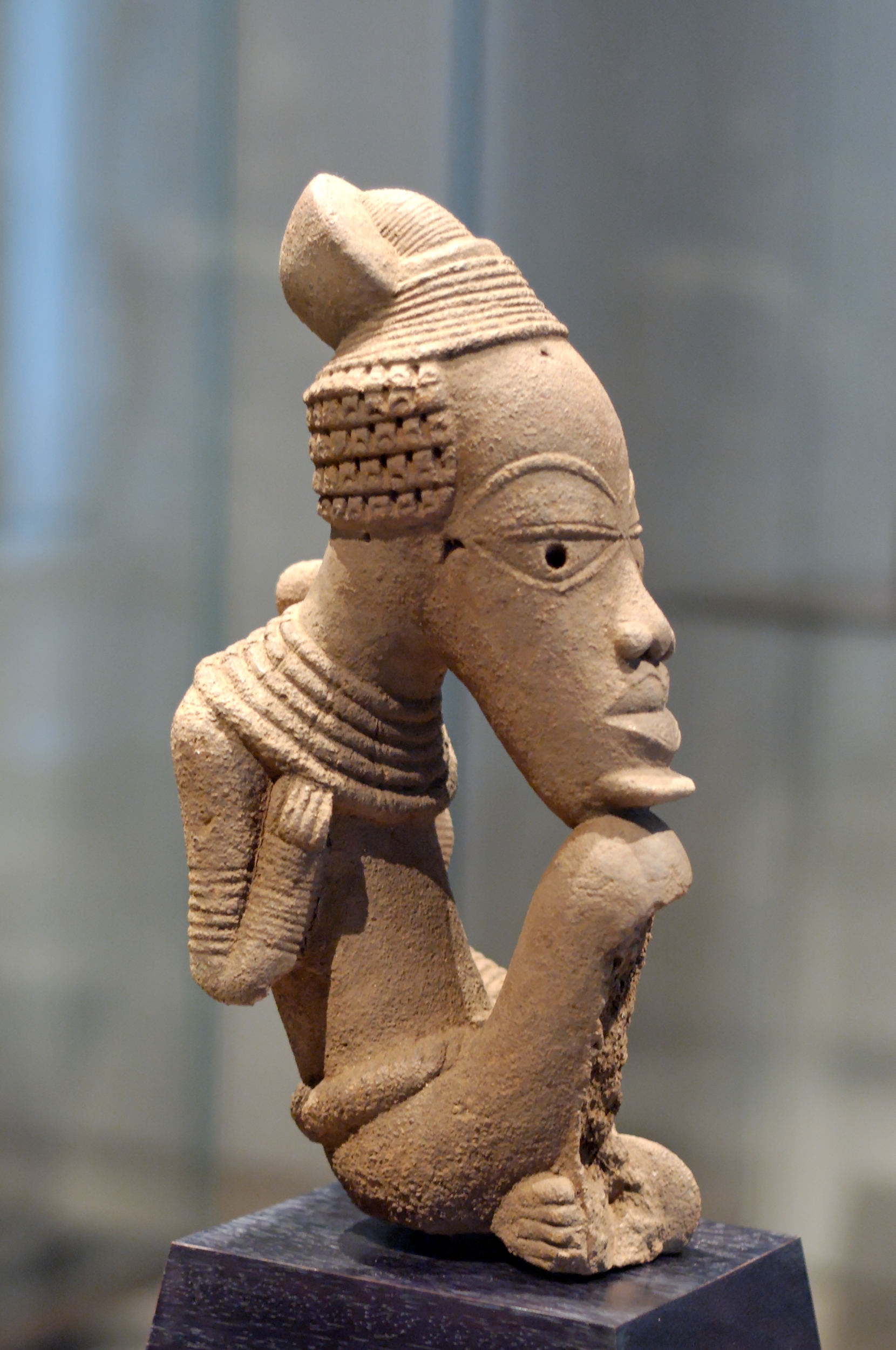
Nok sculpture, terracotta, Louvre

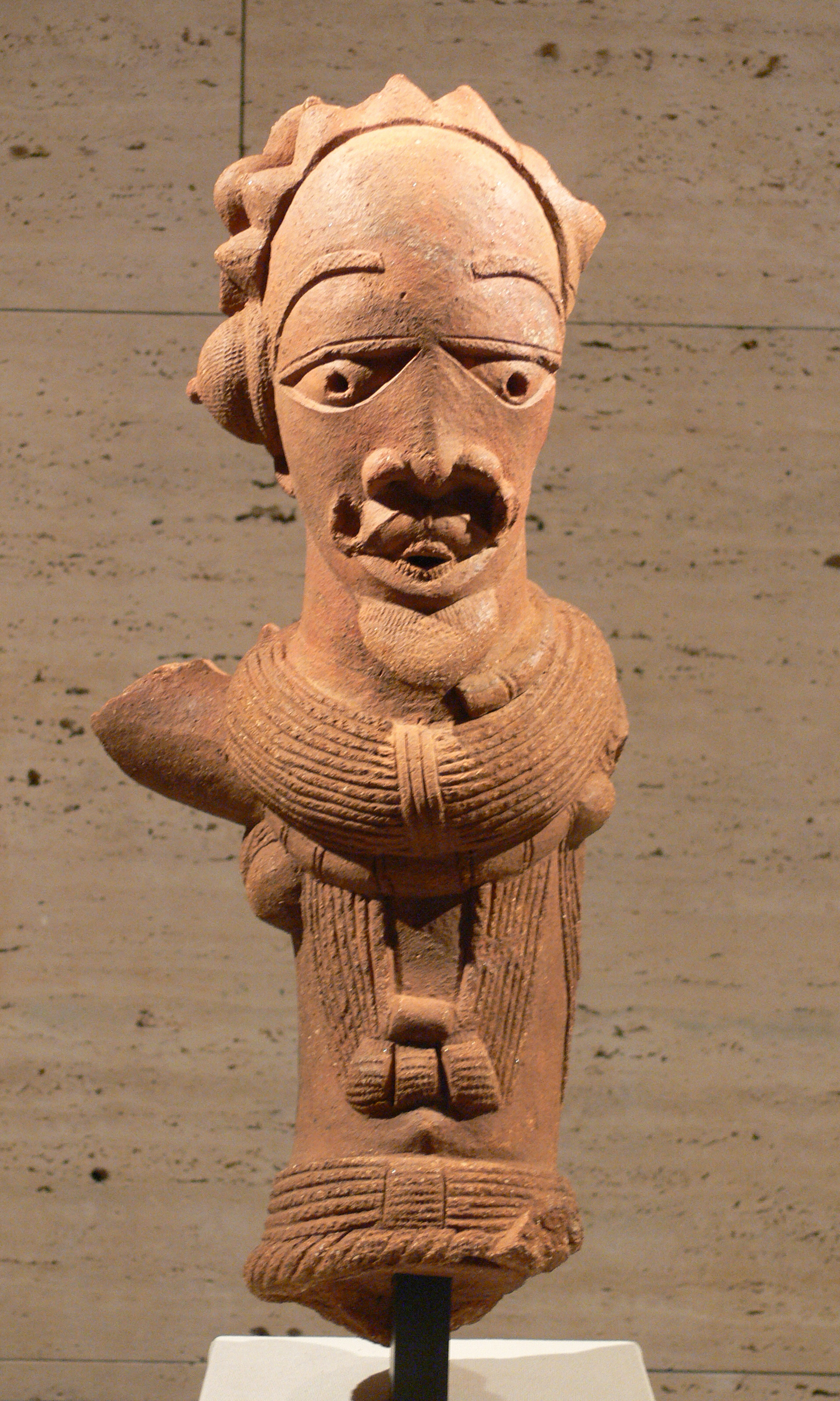
Nok male figure; 500 BC – 500 AD; terracotta; 49.5 cm × 22.2 cm × 16.8 cm (19.5 in × 8.7 in × 6.6 in); from northern Nigeria; Kimbell Art Museum (Fort Worth, Texas, USA)

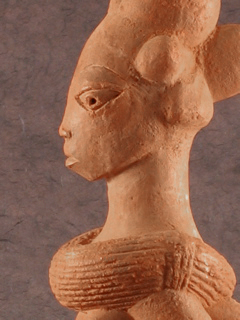
Female statue; 48 cm tall; age: 900 to 1,500 years

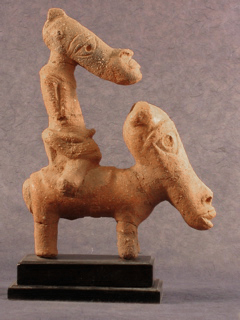
Nok rider and horse; 53 cm tall; age: 1,400 to 2,000 years

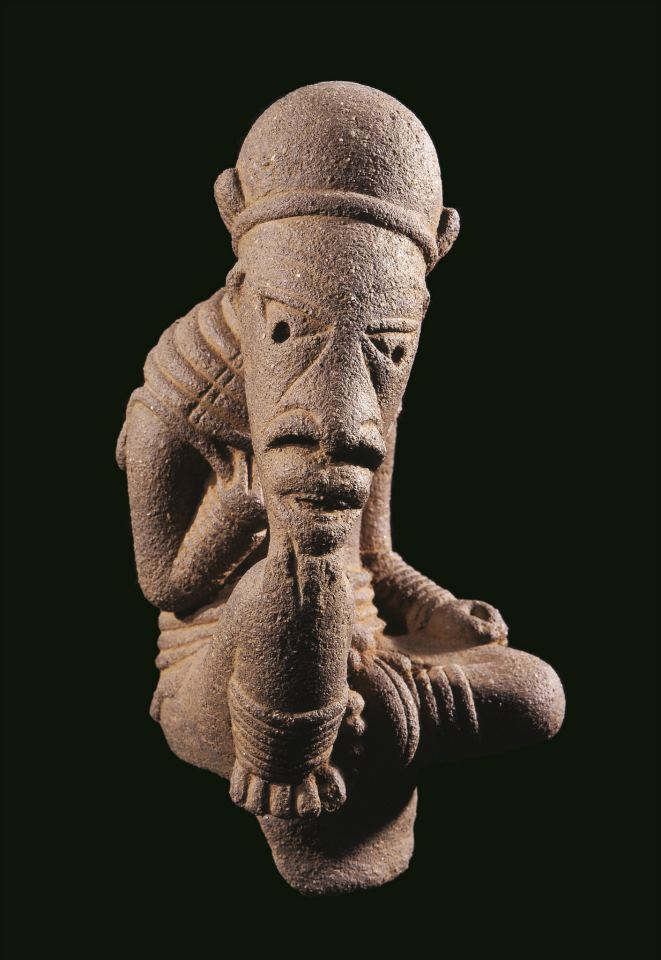
"The thinker" c. 298 AD

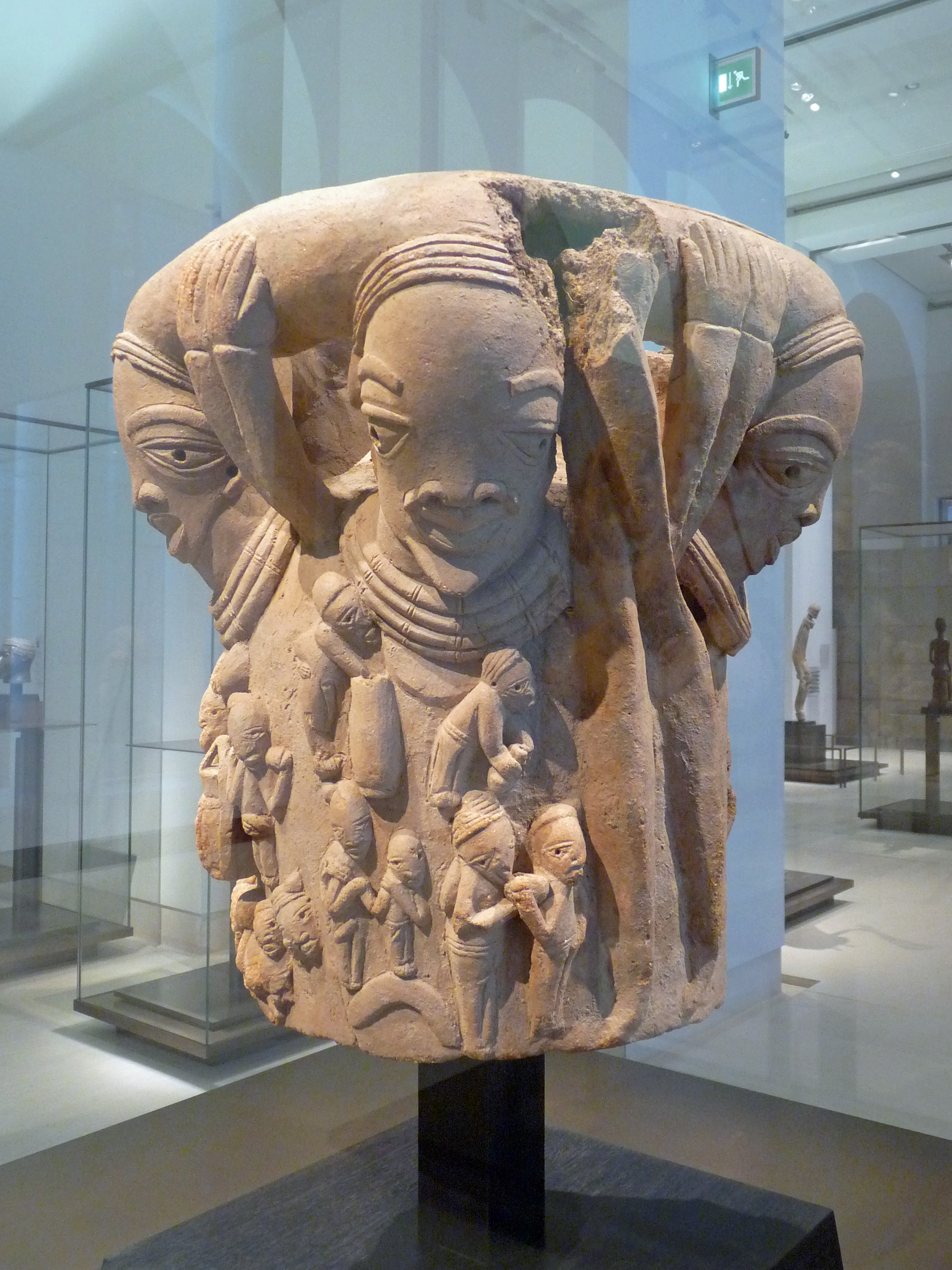
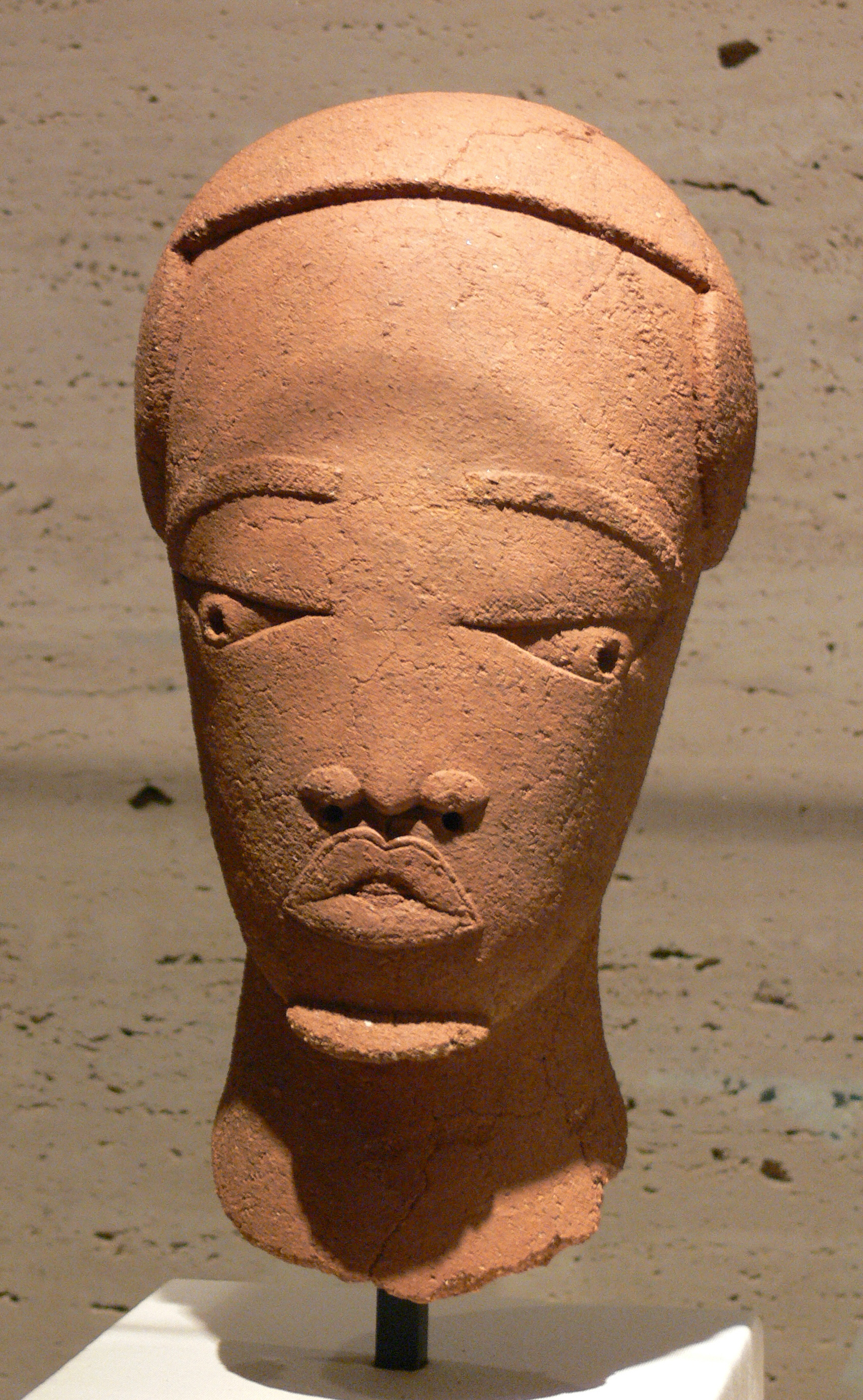

The function of Nok terracotta sculptures is still unknown. For the most part, the terracotta is preserved in the form of scattered fragments. That is why Nok art is well known today only for the heads, both male and female, whose hairstyles are particularly detailed and refined. The statues are in fragments because the discoveries are usually made from alluvial mud, in terrain made by the erosion of water. The terracotta statues found there are hidden, rolled, polished, and broken. Rarely are works of great size conserved intact making them highly valued on the international art market.

The terracotta figures are hollow, coil built, nearly life sized human heads and bodies that are depicted with highly stylized features, abundant jewelry, and varied postures. Because of the homogeneous composition of the scultptures across the Nok cultural, in contrast to the varying compositions of Nok pottery, it is thought that Nok sculpture was made from a few clay deposits, suggesting a centralized and specialized production.

Little is known of the original function of the pieces, but theories include ancestor portrayal, grave markers, and charms to prevent crop failure, infertility, and illness. Also, based on the dome-shaped bases found on several figures, they could have been used as finials for the roofs of ancient structures.

Margaret Young-Sanchez, Associate Curator of Art of the Americas, Africa, and Oceania in The Cleveland Museum of Art, explains that most Nok ceramics were shaped by hand from coarse-grained clay and subtractively sculpted in a manner that suggests an influence from wood carving. After some drying, the sculptures were covered with slip and burnished to produce a smooth, glossy surface. The figures are hollow, with several openings to facilitate thorough drying and firing. The firing process most likely resembled that used today in Nigeria, in which the pieces are covered with grass, twigs, and leaves and burned for several hours.

As a result of natural erosion and deposition, Nok terracottas were scattered at various depths throughout the Sahel grasslands, causing difficulty in the dating and classification of the mysterious artifacts. Luckily, two archaeological sites, Samun Dukiya and Taruga, were found containing Nok art that had remained unmoved. Radiocarbon and thermo-luminescence tests dated the sculptures to a range of dates between about 2,900 and 2,000 years ago, making them some of the oldest in Western Africa. Many further dates were retrieved in the course of new archaeological excavations, extending the beginnings of the Nok tradition even further back in time.

Because of the similarities between the two sites, archaeologist Graham Connah believes that "Nok artwork represents a style that was adopted by a range of iron-using farming societies of varying cultures, rather than being the diagnostic feature of a particular human group as has often been claimed."

Nok people may have developed terracotta sculptures through large-scale economic production. Among Nok terracotta sculptures at Pangwari, there are sculptures portraying a large teeth-bearing therianthropic (human-feline) figure and the torso of a seated figure wearing a belt around their waist and a necklace, which had added features (e.g., bows, knots); there are also sculptures portraying the head of a human figure that has a bird beak and the head of a male figure with a seashell on it, which may have been created by the same sculptor. Additionally, there are sculptures portraying figures wielding slingshots, as well as bows and arrows, which may be indicative of Nok people engaging in the hunting, or trapping, of untamed animals.

One Nok sculpture portrays two individuals, along with their goods, in a dugout canoe. Both of the anthropomorphic figures in the watercraft are paddling. The Nok terracotta depiction of a dugout canoe may indicate that Nok people utilized dugout canoes to transport cargo, along tributaries (e.g., Gurara River) of the Niger River, and exchanged them in a regional trade network. The Nok terracotta depiction of a figure with a seashell on its head may indicate that the span of these riverine trade routes may have extended to the Atlantic coast. In the maritime history of Africa, there is the earlier Dufuna canoe, which was constructed approximately 8000 years ago in the northern region of Nigeria; as the second earliest form of water vessel known in Sub-Saharan Africa, the Nok terracotta depiction of a dugout canoe was created in the central region of Nigeria during the first millennium BCE.

Based on evidence from the sites of Nok archaeological culture, such as considerable quantities of charcoal layered among Nok sculptures, goods (e.g., technically crafted ceramics, numerous stone-beaded necklaces) found in burial pits that support the view of them serving as grave sites, difference in soil coloring of burial pits and their immediate geographic area, and burial pits containing materials from organic substances, this supports the conclusion that Nok sculptures were part of a complex funerary culture.

Excluding ancient Egyptian figurative art, Nok sculptures are regarded to be the most early, large figurative art in continental Africa. Later artistic traditions of West Africa: Bura of Niger (3rd century CE – 10th century CE), Koma of Ghana (7th century CE – 15th century CE), Igbo-Ukwu of Nigeria (9th century CE – 10th century CE), Jenne-Jeno of Mali (11th century CE – 12th century CE), and Ile Ife of Nigeria (11th century CE – 15th century CE) – may have been shaped by the earlier West African clay terracotta tradition of the Nok culture.

=== Settlements and architecture ===
In the central region of Nigeria, Nok archaeological sites are determined to be settlement sites, on the basis of archaeological evidence discovered at the surface level of the sites, and determined to be of the Nok culture, on the basis of the type of archaeological evidence discovered, specifically, Nok terracotta remnants and Nok pottery. Nok settlement sites have been found in flat plains, on hilltops, and on the slopes and summits of mountains. There appears to have been a preference for specific topographic features like elevations and gentle slopes, possibly because they provided favourable drainage during the rainy season. In a preliminary study published in 2005, Rupp et al. stated that the foundation of a wall had been carved out of the underlying granite at the settlement site of Kochio, and that a 'megalithic stone fence' had been erected around a central area in the settlement. However in a subsequent study published in 2016 the authors concluded that these were in fact misinterpreted natural geological features, and that there was no evidence for any stone architecture at Nok sites, apart from the rare exception of the circular stone foundation of a hut discovered in Puntun Dutse. The archaeological evidence indicates that Nok houses were built primarily of organic materials like wood, plant stalks, grasses, and animal hides, which decomposed without leaving visible traces in the soil. Typical Nok settlements were either hamlets or single compounds, similar in size to modern farmsteads found in the same area. There is no indication of agglomerations of people above village level, thus "no evidence that would warrant the existence of communities of a size that would be necessary to develop social stratification, which is regarded as one of the attributes of social complexity." Numerous excavations and prospections have indicated that no towns or any kind of urban environments existed in the Nok culture, and no evidence has been found for special buildings or areas occupied by high-ranking community members. The lack of substantial stratigraphies or evidence of mound formation processes further indicates that Nok sites had brief occupation episodes. In sum, the evidence indicates that Nok culture communities were small-scaled and organised in locally autonomous groups. According to Rupp et al. (2016):

"Rather than attributes of social complexity like signs of inequality, hierarchy, nucleation of settlement systems, communal and public monuments, or alternative African versions of complexity discussed in recent years, it has become apparent that the Nok Culture, no matter which concept is followed, developed complexity only in terms of ritual."

=== Iron metallurgy ===
Iron metallurgy may have developed in the Nok culture between 750 BCE and 550 BCE. Nok people may have independently invented iron metallurgy in the 9th century BCE or 8th century BCE.

=== Stone tools ===
The shapes of stone tools found at Nok sites change little throughout the entire span of the Nok Culture. What tends to strike researchers is a lack of cutting tools. Apart from stone axes, no tools with a cutting edge have been found. Projectile points made of either iron or stone are also absent from Nok sites.

Grinding tools are very common at Nok sites. They are rarely preserved in one piece, but can still illustrate the different shapes and sizes of tools used throughout the Nok Culture. Grinding stones were made of quartzite, granitic, or metamorphic rock. At the site of Ungwar Kura, grinding stones seem to have been placed in a certain order, and at the site of Ido huge grinding slabs were arranged in an upright position with pots and stone beads next to them. This context is assumed to have been ritual in some way. Most of the grinders are merely hand-sized. Throughout Nok sites, there is an abundance of grinding slabs but there seems to be a low number of hand stones. It is possible that members of the Nok Culture used these grinders until they reached a certain state of wear, and then repurposed them as pestles.

Ground stone axes were another tool commonly used by the Nok. They were typically made from fine-grained volcanic rock (siliceous rock is also sometimes seen), and may have been used in food preparation. These axe blades tend to be smallish in size, the largest reaching 20 centimeters. Stone balls are found at almost every Nok site and are approximately palm-sized. They were probably used as hammerstones or for roughening the surface of a grinding stone. Not all of them are ball shaped, however, and many have chipping marks all over or at least in one place. These stone balls likely would have served as mobile grinding stones.

Stone rings have also been found at Nok Culture sites. They are normally found as fragments but can be identified as rings because of their flat, oval or triangular cross-sections and their shapes. These stone rings are very rare and their purpose is unknown, but their use as currency or a medium of exchange has been suggested. Another rare find is stone beads, which are typically found as if strung on strings. Beads tend to be carefully made out of hard siliceous rock such as quartz, chalcedony, jasper, or carnelian. There are three different bead shapes: cylindrical, which is the most common shape, as well as rod and ring-shaped.

=== Ceramics ===
Potsherds (pottery shards) are the most abundant archaeological artifacts at Nok sites. Since 2009, excavated pottery has been undergoing systematic analysis with a central aim to try and establish a chronology. Certain attributes of the pottery such as decoration, shape, and size appear with an increasing frequency and then disappear, being replaced with different pottery attributes. This change can sometimes allow one to divide the progression into different intervals based on the different attributes. In total approximately 90,000 potsherds have been collected, of which 15,000 have been considered diagnostic, meaning that they are decorated, sherds from the rim or the bottom of the vessel, or they have handles or holes in them. The results of the pottery analysis can be delineated into three distinct time periods: Early, Middle, and Late.

==== Early Nok Period ceramics ====
From approximately c. 1500–900 BC the pottery of the Early Nok Period are mostly small and not very well preserved. They seem to be richly decorated with various elaborate patterns directly below the vessels' rims and covering a large part of the ceramic body. The lines made on the pottery seem to be remarkably fine or curving lines. There tend to be many lines that are close together and some even have crisscrossing lines beneath the rim. Pottery frequently had everted and broad, thick rims.

==== Middle Nok Period ceramics ====
The Middle Nok Period is approximately from c. 900–300 BC and in this time period there is a dramatic increase of sites, terracotta fragments and iron objects. Instead of the early period's decoration, which tended to cover most of the pot, instead, there is a decorative band which is bordered by deep horizontal lines. This band appears on the pots' upper half or directly under the rim of the bowls. Some bands have sharp ends as well as impressed zigzag lines or an incised wave or arc. Unlike the Early Nok period the Middle Nok ceramics tend to have more variety in the rim with everted rims, open bowls, bowls with inverted rims and incised line ornaments on the rims' lips.

==== Late Nok Period ceramics ====
The Late Nok period is from approximately c. 300–1 BC and has only a few known sites. There is little pottery available for analysis but from the pottery that was found there is a decrease in the strictness of the ornamental band. While bands are still used, they are more complexly decorated with additional patterning. There also tends to be a returning pattern of body decoration. The variety of rim sizes and types seem to be increasing even more than in the Middle Nok period.

=== Farming ===
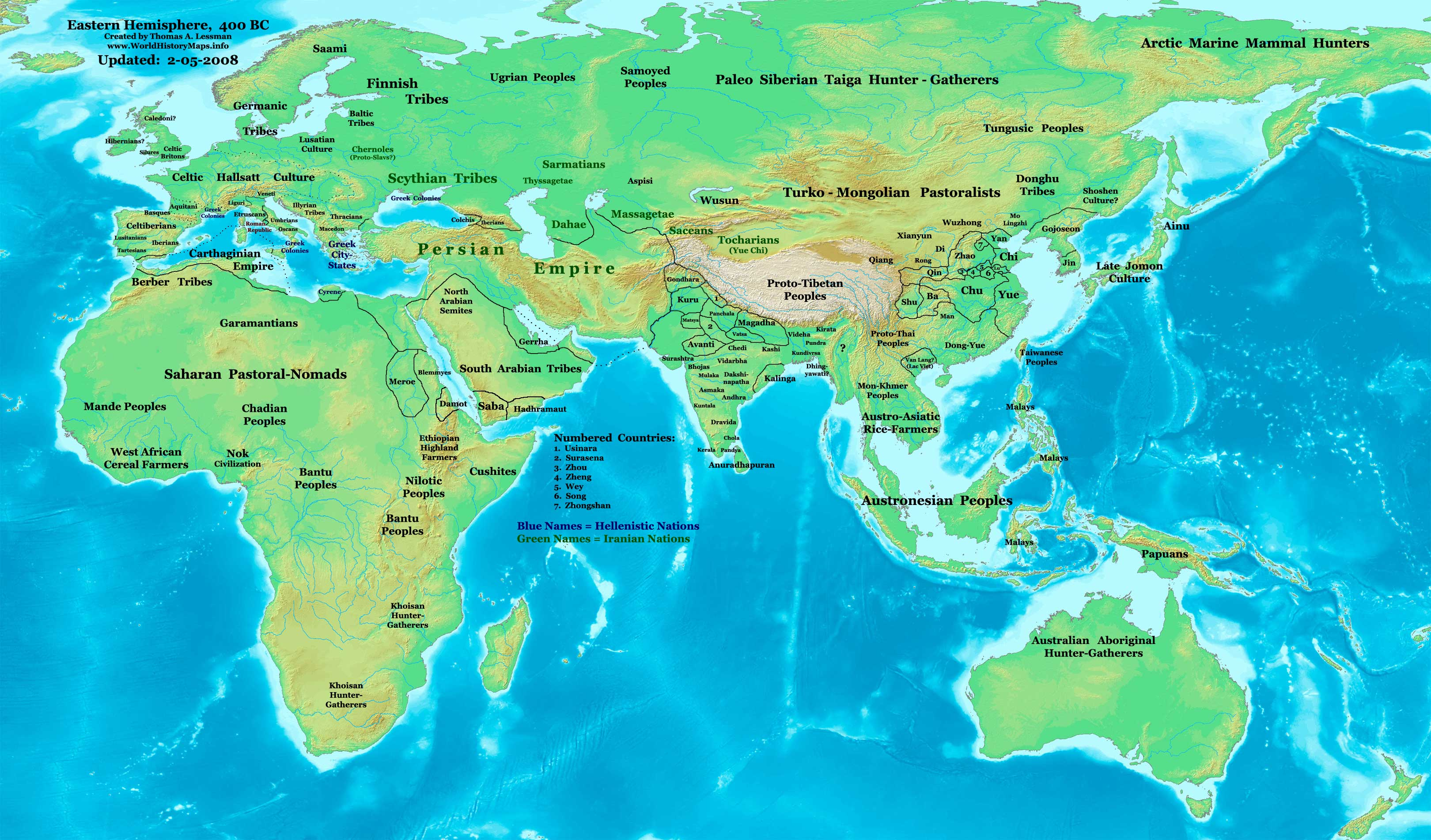
Map of the old world in 400 BC showing the Nok culture

Akin to the peoples of the Chad Basin and Kintampo culture, the people of the Nok culture employed a mixed cropping method of cultivating cowpeas and pearl millet as well as utilized oleaginous fruits. At Pangwari, pearl millet was domesticated and cultivated, cowpeas were cultivated, and various forms of vegetation (e.g., Caesalpinioideae, Canarium schweinfurthii, Combretaceae, Phyllanthaceae, Vitex) were utilized. Hunting-gathering was another subsistence pattern followed by the Nok people.

==== Grains ====
Nok peoples may have migrated into the central region of Nigeria and brought into the area the agricultural knowledge of cultivating tamed pearl millet between 1500 BCE and 900 BCE. At almost all Nok sites, there are charred plant remains consisting of firewood and plant material for cooking. Remains of pearl millet, one of Africa's oldest grain crops, are commonly found. Pearl millet is highly productive and resistant to adverse growing conditions, including drought. Cowpeas, valued for their high protein content, are also found at some sites. So far, pearl millet and cowpeas are the only crops known to have been cultivated by the Nok people. It is unclear whether they ate or farmed tubers of any kind. The numerous grinding stones found at Nok sites suggest that the grains were ground into flour and made into a type of porridge.

==== Fruit ====
Hard pits from wild fruits have been found at many Nok sites. At some sites, fruit and seeds of other wild plants such as grasses and legumes were discovered. Overall there is not a huge selection of plant remains, but this could simply mean they were not preserved. More recent evidence of Carbonized plant remains of the Nok suggest that they foraged for tree fruits.

==== Trees and farming ====
The Nok people probably used an agroforestry system, combining cultivated crops with useful trees on the same plot of land. These plots are ecologically sustainable and inter-cropping of trees and several cultivated plant species were common from the savannas to the rain forest, with the origins of the practice going back to the first millennium BC, right at the time of the Nok culture. Most West African trees are not domesticated but are part of the wild vegetation which is left after farmers clear their fields of their crops. Because they are left to grow they multiply naturally without needing to be planted. Trees can produce food, medicine and animal feed.

==== Animals ====
Because of the acidic soil, no animal bones from the Nok culture have been preserved, leaving no direct evidence of what species they might have domesticated (or hunted). The only evidence for animals during the Nok culture period is the depictions of animals as figurines or terracotta sculptures.

==== Food ====
As of 3500 years ago, Nok agriculturalists gathered and utilized bee products (e.g., gathered honey in pottery). The honey may have been utilized by Nok agriculturalists to add to West African cuisines. As evidenced by remnants of beeswax and fats from animals on ceramics, the pottery may have been utilized to store meat, along with honey utilized for preservation purposes.

=== Traditional medicine ===
As part of Nok traditional medicine, Nok ceramics may have been used to process roots and bark as medicinal plants for the production of medicinal decoctions.

=== Looting and repatriation ===
Since the 1970s, Nok terracotta figures have been heavily looted. Even larger-scale looting commenced in the Nok cultural area in 1994, and by 1995 two main local traders emerged. Each of the main traders could employ approximately 1,000 diggers to unearth terracottas every day. Although the majority of the terracottas were fragmented, some were intact and sellable. Because of this, hundreds of Nok Culture sites have been illegally dug in search of these terracotta sculptures. Valuable information about the Nok Culture is lost when these objects are taken from out of the ground and removed from their archaeological contexts.

In 1979, Nigeria's National Commission of Museums and Monuments Decree established the National Commission for Museums and Monuments (NCMM), which is used to manage Nigeria's cultural heritage. NCMM Decree number 77 made it illegal for anyone other than authorized personnel to buy or sell antiquities within Nigeria or export an antiquity without a permit from the NCMM. Towards the end of the 1990s the federal government of Nigeria implemented the NCMM, which initiated a series of actions to work out strategies for combating the problems of looting and to map out a plan of action. The general consensus was that laws governing antiquities and penalties for offenders needed to be strictly enforced and that all archaeological sites should be monitored. The NCMM also recommended more aggressive public enlightenment campaigns as well as a series of sensitization programs across the nation. These programs are considered a success in terms of increased awareness by law enforcement agents, as well as the Nigerian customs authorities and Interpol. However, not all of the recommendations were implemented, because the Nigerian government did not have the resources to face the large scale of some of the challenges. For example, the government did not have the resources to place monitors at all archaeological sites, and terracotta figures still slip through Nigeria's borders.

Today, the terracotta sculptures are very highly sought after on the international art market, and so artifacts continue to be dug up without documentation of the contexts in which they were buried. A lack of extensive archaeological study has also severely limited our understanding of the Nok cultures. A joint research project with Goethe University and the National Commission for Museums and Monuments conducted since 2005 showed that more than 90% of Nok Culture sites known in the research area have been illegally looted. Art historical studies carried out shows that over 1,000 Nok terracotta sculptures have been illegally excavated and smuggled into Europe, the USA, Japan, and elsewhere. In February 2013, Daily Trust reported that the Nigerian Federal Ministry of Information and National Orientation repossessed five Nok statuettes looted by a French thief in August 2010. The pieces had been seized by French customs agents and were repatriated following a Nigerian Government Directive. What further complicates the problem are the many workshops which fake Nok sculptures and then put them on the market as authentic.

== Descendants ==
As each share cultural and artistic similarity with the Nok culture found in Nok, Sokoto, and Katsina, the Niger-Congo-speaking Yoruba, Jukun, or Dakakari peoples and Bassa people may be descendants of the Nok peoples. Based on stylistic similarities with the Nok terracottas, the bronze figurines of the Yoruba Ife Empire and the Bini kingdom of Benin may also be continuations of the traditions of the earlier Nok culture.

== See also ==
- Nok Iron Smelting
- Early Nigerian history
