= Rop rock shelter =

Archaeological site in Nigeria

- location in Nigeria
- 9°20′57″N 8°51′17″E
- Location: Jos Plateau
- Region: Nigeria

Site notes
- Excavation dates: 1944
- Archaeologists: Bernard Fagg

The Rop rock shelter is an archaeological site on the Jos Plateau of Nigeria. There are two layers containing artifacts. The first holds large scrapers and backed crescent-shaped stone tools. The later (upper) layer is about 2000 years old, and contains backed microlithic tools and pottery. The shelter is about 50km south of Jos.

The site was excavated by Bernard Fagg in 1944. He discovered microliths, fragments of ground stone axes, two bored stones, one grooved stone, rubbed hematites and many potsherds. The lower, undated layer held relatively crude implements, apart from the rough crescents. The later layer held higher-quality microliths, geometrical forms and small points, as well as pottery. This later layer only covers part of the site. A skeleton was also found in a shallow grave, dated to around 25 BCE From the teeth, it appeared that the owner had lived largely on a starchy, plant-based diet. A single equid tooth was found with the same age based on its position in the stratum.
