= William Buller Fagg =

British anthropologist

William Buller Fagg CMG (28 April 1914 – 10 July 1992) was a British curator and anthropologist. He was the Keeper of the Department of Ethnography at the British Museum (1969–1974), and pioneering historian of Yoruba and Nigerian art, with a particular focus on the art of Benin.

== Family and background ==
William Fagg was born in Upper Norwood, London to William Percy Fagg (d.1939), an antiquarian bookseller, and his wife Lilian Fagg (née Buller). His brother was the British archaeologist and museum curator Bernard Evelyn Buller Fagg.

== Education ==
Fagg was educated at Dulwich College before entering Magdalene College, Cambridge to study classics, winning prizes for Latin hexameters and Latin epigrams. After graduating in 1936, the next year he went on to take a second degree in Archaeology and Anthropology at the University of Cambridge.

== Career ==
Fagg had a long and distinguished career at the British Museum. In 1938, he was appointed the Assistant Keeper of Ethnography and continued in this post until 1955, when he became the Deputy Keeper of Ethnography and, from 1969 to 1973, he was the Keeper of the Department of Ethnography. In 1969, he oversaw the move of the Department of Ethnography from the British Museum to Burlington Gardens where it was known as the Museum of Mankind. Between 1942 and 1945, Fagg had been seconded to the Industries and Manufactures Department of the Board of Trade.

On his return to the British Museum after the end of the War, he was given curatorial responsibility for the African collections. Fagg spent a considerable amount of time engaged in fieldwork in Africa: the Belgian Congo in 1949–1950; Nigeria in 1953, 1958–1959, 1971, and 1981; Cameroon in 1966; and Mali in 1969. His brother, Bernard Fagg, had been working in Nigeria since 1939 and in 1952 he had established the first public museum in West Africa in Jos, Nigeria, becoming the head of this institution from 1957 until Nigerian independence. In 1956 he was replaced as the Royal Anthropological Institute's General Secretary by the American anthropologist Marian Smith.

William Fagg purchased Benin art for the newly founded Lagos museum during his 1958–1959 trip to Nigeria. He donated his photographic negatives and related documentation to the Royal Anthropological Institute shortly before his death so they could be used for research purposes by others.

William Fagg curated a number of important exhibitions, with a particular focus on Nigerian art. In 1960, he organised an exhibition in London to mark Nigerian Independence for the Art Council, UK. This exhibition travelled to Manchester, Bristol, Munich and Basle. It also led him to write the book 'Nigerian Images' (1963) for which he won the Amaury Talbot Prize for African Anthropology. He curated exhibitions on Nigerian art at the First World Congress of Black Arts and Cultures in 1966 held in Dakar, Senegal. For his writings associated with this work he won the Grand Prize for the best work on African art and led to his being granted the CMG in 1967. After the move of the British Museum's Ethnographic collections to Burlington Gardens, Fagg curated many changing exhibitions with the first showcasing the museum's collection of Benin art within a partial reconstruction of the Benin Palace.

He was Consulting Fellow in African Art for the Museum of Primitive Art in New York (now part of the Metropolitan Museum) from 1957 to 1970. After retirement, he was the tribal art consultant for Christie's in London until 1990.

A William Fagg lecture is held annually at the British Museum.

== Publications ==
- Two Woodcarvings from the Baga of French Guinea (1947: Man, Vol.47, pp. 105–106)
- Ancient Arts and Modern Parodies (1949: Nature, Vol.163(4134), p. 146)
- Anthropology and Art (1949: Nature, Vol.164(4161), p. 174)
- Science and Tribal Art (1951: Nature, Vol.168(4287), p. 1099)
- Tribal Sculpture and the Festival of Britain (1951: Man, Vol.51(), pp. 73–76)
- The Webster Plass collection of African art / The catalogue of a memorial exhibition held in the King Edward VII Galleries of the British Museum (1953)
- The Allman Collection of Benin Antiquities (1953: Man, Vol.53(), pp. 165–169)
- Afro-Portuguese ivories (1959)
- The Epstein collection of tribal and exotic sculpture (1960)
- African sculpture: an anthology (1964) with Margaret Plass
- Tribes and Forms in African Art (1965)
- Miniature Wood Carvings of Africa (1970)
- Raffles Gamelan: A Historical Note (1970)
- Sir Hans Sloane and ethnography (1970) by H. J. Braunholtz; with a note by Sir Gavin de Beer; edited with a foreword by William Fagg
- Living Arts of Nigeria (1972)
- Divine Kingship in Africa (1978)
- The Sculpture of Africa (1978) with Eliot Elisofon
- Yoruba Beadwork: Art of Nigeria (1980)
- African majesty: From grassland and forest : the Barbara and Murray Frum Collection, 22 May – 12 July 1981 (1981)
- Kunst und Religion der Lobi in Westafrika (1982: African Arts, Vol.15(4), pp. 70–72)
- Yoruba: Sculpture of West Africa (1984) with John Pemberton and Bryan Holcombe
- Nigerian Images (1990)
