= Bons's dwarf day gecko =

Conservation status
- Least Concern (IUCN 3.1)

Scientific classification
- Kingdom: Animalia
- Phylum: Chordata
- Class: Reptilia
- Order: Squamata
- Suborder: Gekkota
- Family: Gekkonidae
- Genus: Lygodactylus
- Species: L. bonsi

Binomial name
- Lygodactylus bonsi G. Pasteur, 1962

Synonyms
- Lygodactylus bernardi bonsi G. Pasteur, 1962; Lygodactylus bonsi — Rösler, 2000; Lygodactylus bonsi — Travers, Jackmann & Bauer, 2014

Species of lizard

Bons's dwarf day gecko or Bons' dwarf day gecko (Lygodactylus bonsi) is a species of lizard in the family Gekkonidae. The species is endemic to Malawi.

== Etymology ==
The specific name, bonsi, is in honour of French herpetologist Jacques Bons (born 1933).

== Taxonomy ==
L. bonsi was originally described as a subspecies of Bernard's dwarf gecko (Lygodactylus bernardi), but has since year 2000 considered a full species.

== Geographic range ==
L. bonsi is found in the Mulanje Massif in southern Malawi.

== Habitat ==
The preferred natural habitat of L. bonsi is rocky areas in grassland, at altitudes of 2,000–2,953 m (6,562–9,688 ft).

== Reproduction ==
L. bonsi is oviparous.
