= Bernard's dwarf gecko =

Scientific classification
- Kingdom: Animalia
- Phylum: Chordata
- Class: Reptilia
- Order: Squamata
- Suborder: Gekkota
- Family: Gekkonidae
- Genus: Lygodactylus
- Species: L. bernardi

Binomial name
- Lygodactylus bernardi V. FitzSimons, 1958

Species of lizard

Bernard's dwarf gecko (Lygodactylus bernardi), also commonly known as FitzSimons' dwarf gecko, is a species of gecko, a lizard in the family Gekkonidae. The species is endemic to Zimbabwe.

== Etymology ==
The specific name, bernardi, is in honor of British archaeologist Bernard Evelyn Buller Fagg.

== Geographic range ==
L. bernardi is endemic to eastern Zimbabwe. Lygodactylus bonsi from Malawi was originally described as a subspecies of L. bernardi.

== Description ==
Dorsally, L. bernardi is olive with pale spots. Ventrally, it is bluish-white on the throat, yellow on the belly, and orange to orange-brown on the tail.

Adults are only 3–4 cm (1.2–1.6 in) in snout-to-vent length (SVL).

== Reproduction ==
L. bernardi is an oviparous species.
