= Jos Museum =

Museum in Nigeria

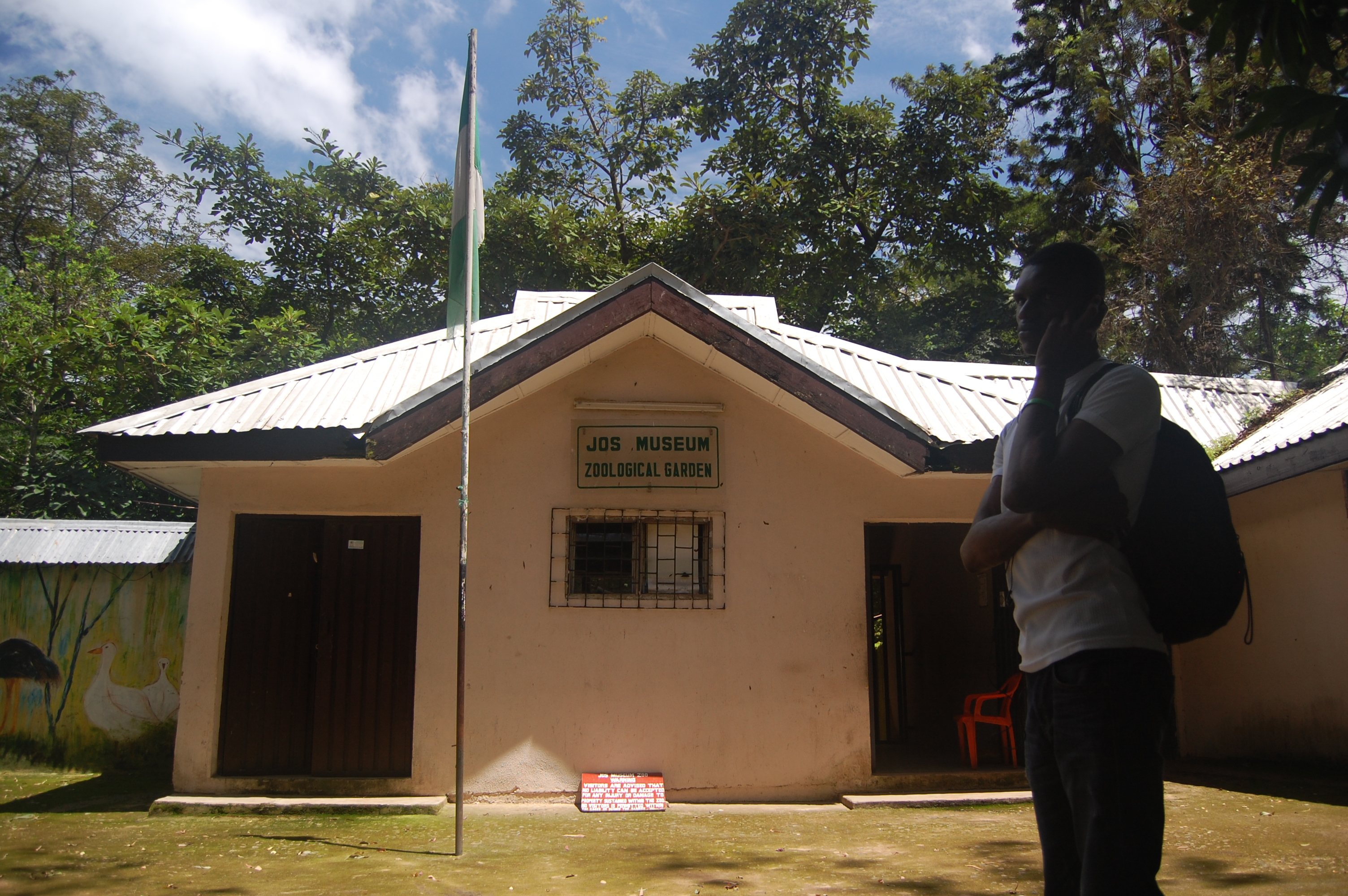
- Established: 1952
- Location: 1 Museum St, 930105, Jos, Nigeria
- Founder: Bernard Fagg

Jos Museum is a museum in Jos, Nigeria. The museum was established in 1952 by Bernard Fagg.

The museum administers the Museum of Traditional Nigerian Architecture. The museum complex also houses a Botanical Garden, a Pottery Museum, a Zoo, and a library.

== History ==
Plans for the museum had begun in 1944 after accidental archeological discoveries prompted by mining in the area, but it was not until October 1949, when £6500 pounds was granted for its construction that work began. The museum was opened in 1952 by Bernard E. B. Fagg, who served as the Director of Antiquities of the colonial administration at the time, until 1963. It was the first public museum in West Africa. The site the museum had been built on was purchased with expansion in mind by Fagg, who saw it more as a complex. It was characterized as a experimental, with its interdisciplinary approach to the idea of a museum.

When the museum first opened, the display collection largely consisted of Nok figurine culture, but also featured archaeological contributions from across the country, including a Benin Bronze.

The zoo first began unofficially in 1955, and was later formally established in 1960. The museum library houses a collection of Arabic manuscripts, dating from the 16th to 20th centuries, which it began acquiring in 1958. In 1961, the botanical garden opened.

In 1963, UNESCO established the Regional Training Centre in Jos. The institution was bilingual in English and French until the establishment of a separate French-language centre in Niamey. After UNESCO ended its financial support, the centre lost funding and resources.

The museum has fallen into disrepair, attributed to a lack of government funding, raising concerns about loss of cultural preservation. In 2019, the museum was only allocated ₦158,197,120.

=== Theft and recovery of artifacts ===
On 14 January 1987, the museum was robbed of nine valuable artifacts by a group of thieves. A list of the stolen artifacts was made by UNESCO.

In December 1990, one of the stolen artifacts, a fifteenth-century Benin Bronze, was discovered at an auctioneer in Zürich. It was returned to the museum after two independent Swiss citizens suspected and confirmed that it was stolen.

Another stolen artifact, a bronze head from Ifẹ, was discovered in London in 2017. The sculpture had been auctioned off in 2007 by the Belgian government. It was purchased by an antiques dealer, unaware that it was stolen. The buyer attempted to sell the head through the auction house Woolley and Wallis, but auctioneer John Axford realized it was stolen and passed it on to police. This led to a legal battle between the Jos Museum and the buyer over ownership of the artifact. As of 2022, the artifact is currently held by UK police.
