= Bernard Fagg =

Bernard Evelyn Buller Fagg
- Born: 8 December 1915; Upper Norwood
- Died: 14 August 1987 (aged 71); Oxford
- Occupations: Archaeologist, Museum curator

Bernard Evelyn Buller Fagg MBE, (8 December 1915 – 14 August 1987) was a British archaeologist and museum curator who undertook extensive work in Nigeria before and after the Second World War.

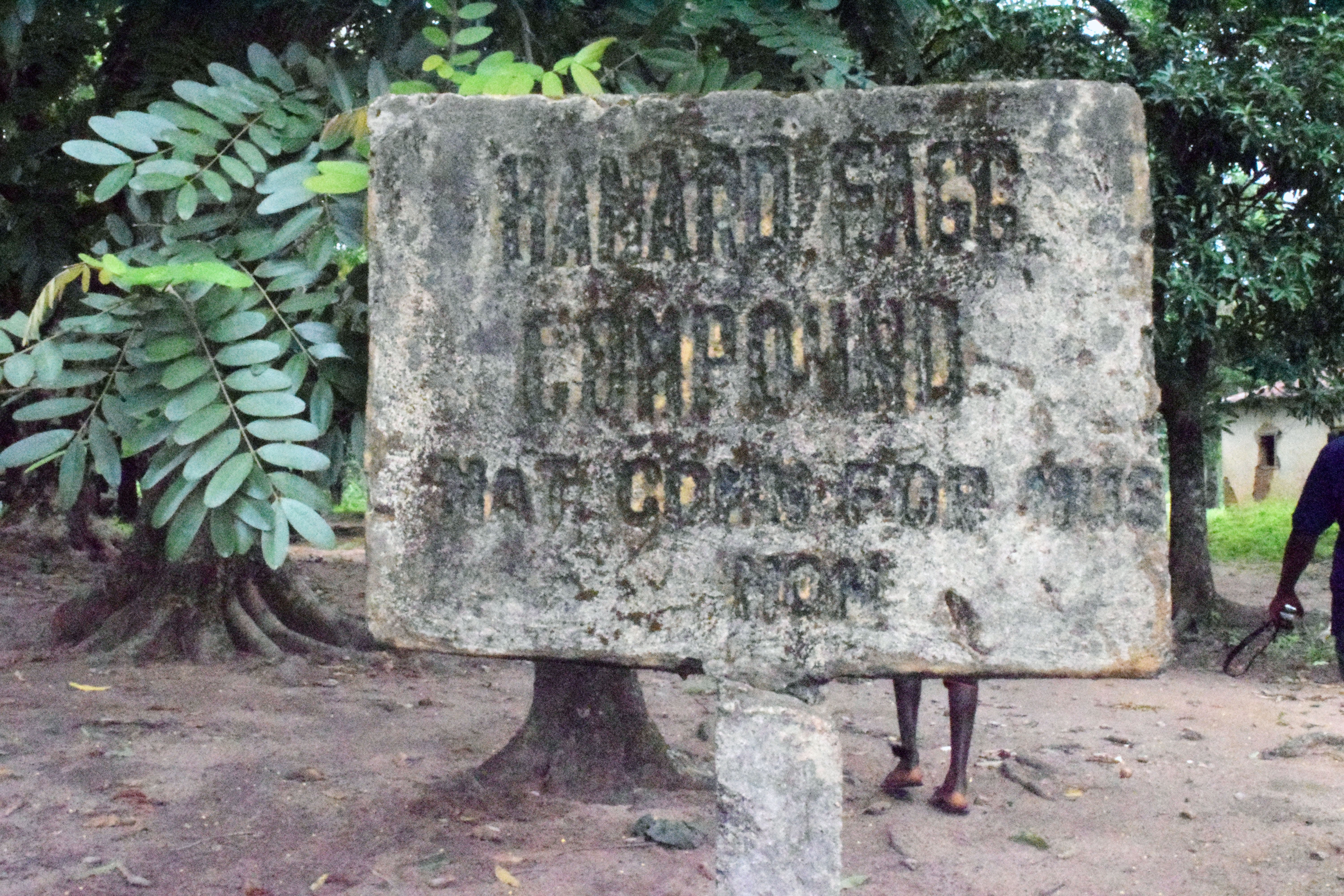
Bernard Fagg's compound signpost at Nok

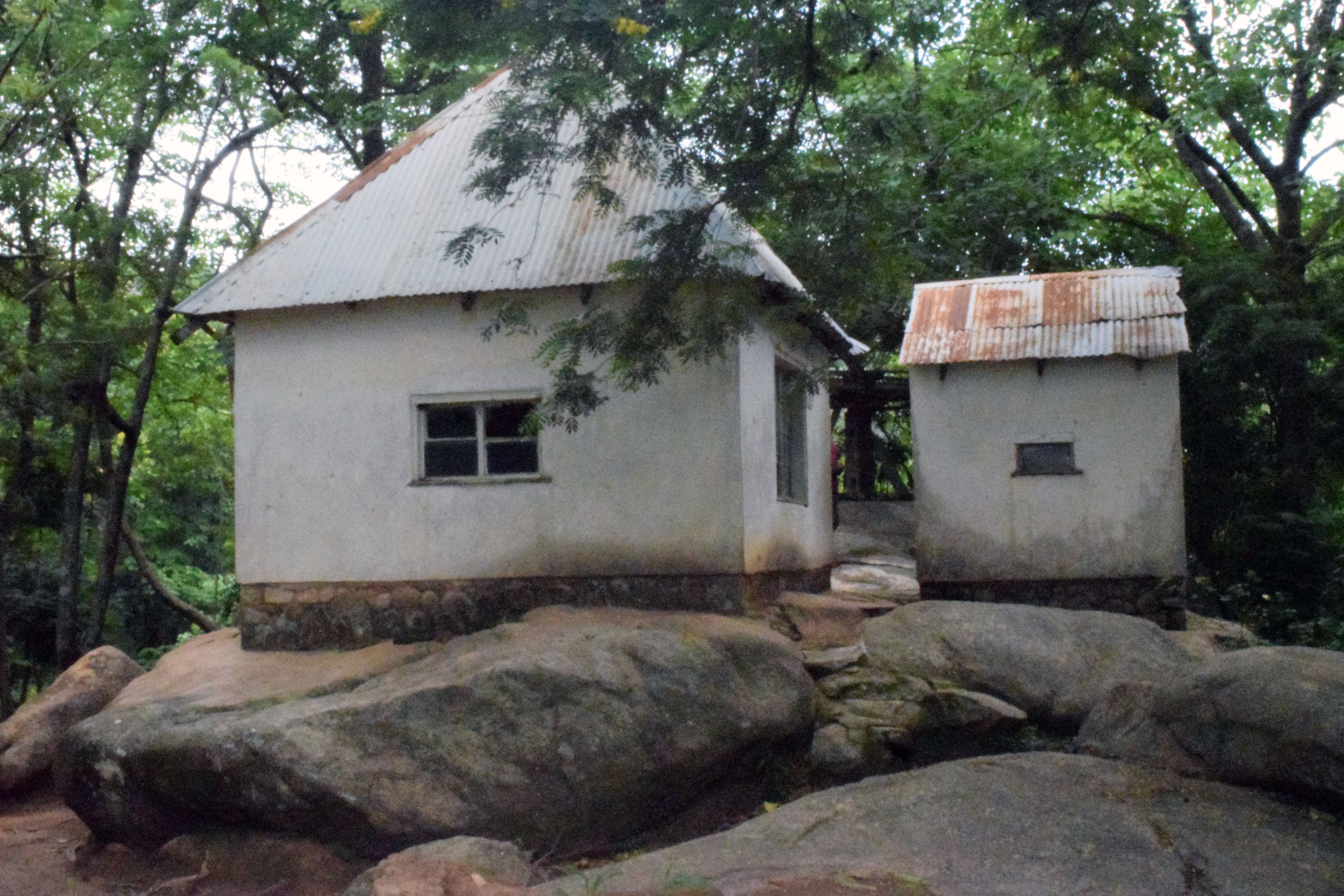
Bernard Fagg's compound residence at Nok, erected c. 1943

== Biography ==
Fagg was born in Upper Norwood to antiquarian bookseller William Percy Fagg and his wife Lilian Fagg (née Buller). His brother was William Buller Fagg. Bernard Fagg studied classics, archaeology and anthropology at Downing College, University of Cambridge. After graduation he began to work for the British colonial administration in Jos, Nigeria, in 1939. He excavated the Rop rock shelter on the Jos Plateau in 1944, a site that contained both early stone-age implements and later artifacts, including pottery about 2000 years old. Fagg first encountered archaeological finds of what became later known as the Nok culture, after the village of Nok where the first terracotta figurines where found. He undertook a controlled excavation of the site at Taruga, finding both terracotta figurines and iron slag with radiocarbon dates from about the fourth and third centuries BC.

In 1947 Fagg was appointed as the assistant surveyor of antiquities of the newly founded Department of Antiquities of the colonial administration. In 1952 he founded the National Museum in Jos, the first public museum in Nigeria. Along with Walker Evans and Eliot Elisofon, he contributed photographs to Bollingen's African Folktales and Culture. He became head in 1957 after the first director Kenneth Murray retired. After Nigeria became independent, Fagg became the Curator of the Pitt Rivers Museum in Oxford in 1963.

== A new Pitt Rivers Museum ==
Much of Fagg's time in Oxford was spent trying to raise funds for a new Pitt Rivers Museum building in Oxford to replace the original building, but in the north of the city along the Banbury Road. The project, which ultimately failed, was to define Fagg's curatorship. However, Fagg was seen by many in Oxford as the right person to spearhead such an initiative. As a subsequent Curator of the Museum Schuyler Jones said, 'there was a general feeling that the Museum had outgrown its first Oxford home and that two things were needed: an imaginative scheme for a new museum, and someone with experience and energy to guide it through to completion.' Other leading authorities were equally enthused by the prospect of the new scheme, with Jaquetta Hawkes writing that: "It may be that of late the distinguished and enthusiastic curator, Mr Bernard Fagg, has been, if not deliberately adding to the sense of congestion, at least not officiously striving to relieve it. For there is now a glorious probability that a new Pitt Rivers Museum will arise in Oxford, a place where the marvellous collections could be properly spaced, well lit and in every way displayed in a manner worthy of their quality."

Plans reached a considerable stage of advancement by the end of the 1960s with architectural drawings by Pier Luigi Nervi and some high profile supporters. However the ambitious project was eventually shelved due to a lack of funding, as well as Fagg's own health issues following a stroke in May 1968. He retired from this post in December 1975.

== Legacy ==
Bernard Fagg is commemorated in the scientific name of species of lizard, Lygodactylus bernardi.
