= Bura archaeological site =

Coordinates: 13.898°N 1.039°E

Bura is an archaeological site located in the Tillabéry Region of the Tera Department in southwest Niger. The archaeological site has given its name to the area's first-millennium Bura culture.

== Site description ==
The Bura site consists of many individual necropoleis with coffins crested by unusually distinctive terra cotta statuettes. The main necropolis itself has a diameter of about one kilometer. Burial mounds, religious altars, and ancient dwellings occur here over a large area. In 1983 a site 25 meters by 20 meters was excavated.

== Artifacts and looting ==
Following the 1975 discovery and 1983 excavation of the Bura archaeological site, and after a Bura-Asinda exhibition toured France in the 1990s, the ancient Bura earthenware statuettes became highly valued by collectors.

The clay and stone anthropomorphic heads of the ancient and medieval Bura culture have been sought for their unusual abstraction and simplicity.

Unfortunately, widespread looting and smuggling have followed this commercial demand, and so many of the Bura culture sites have been negatively impacted. Le Monde concludes that "90 percent of Niger's Bura sites have been damaged" by looters and vandals since 1994.

Other Bura artifacts have been large terracotta burial jars (both tubular and ovoid) and varied funerary pottery. Of the 834 Bura-related sites in the Niger River valley, UNESCO reports that the original Bura archaeological site has produced the oldest equestrian clay statues.

More recently, many Bura "rat-tail" iron-age spear-points have also entered the Euro-American collectors market.

== World Heritage status ==
This site was added to the UNESCO World Heritage Tentative List on May 26, 2006 in the Cultural category.
