= Nok =

Village in Kaduna, Nigeria

- Village, Archaeological site
- Location within Nigeria
- Coordinates: 9°29′25.02″N 8°1′13.44″E
- Country: Nigeria
- State: Kaduna

Nok is a village in Jaba Local Government Area of Kaduna State, Nigeria. The village is an archaeological site.

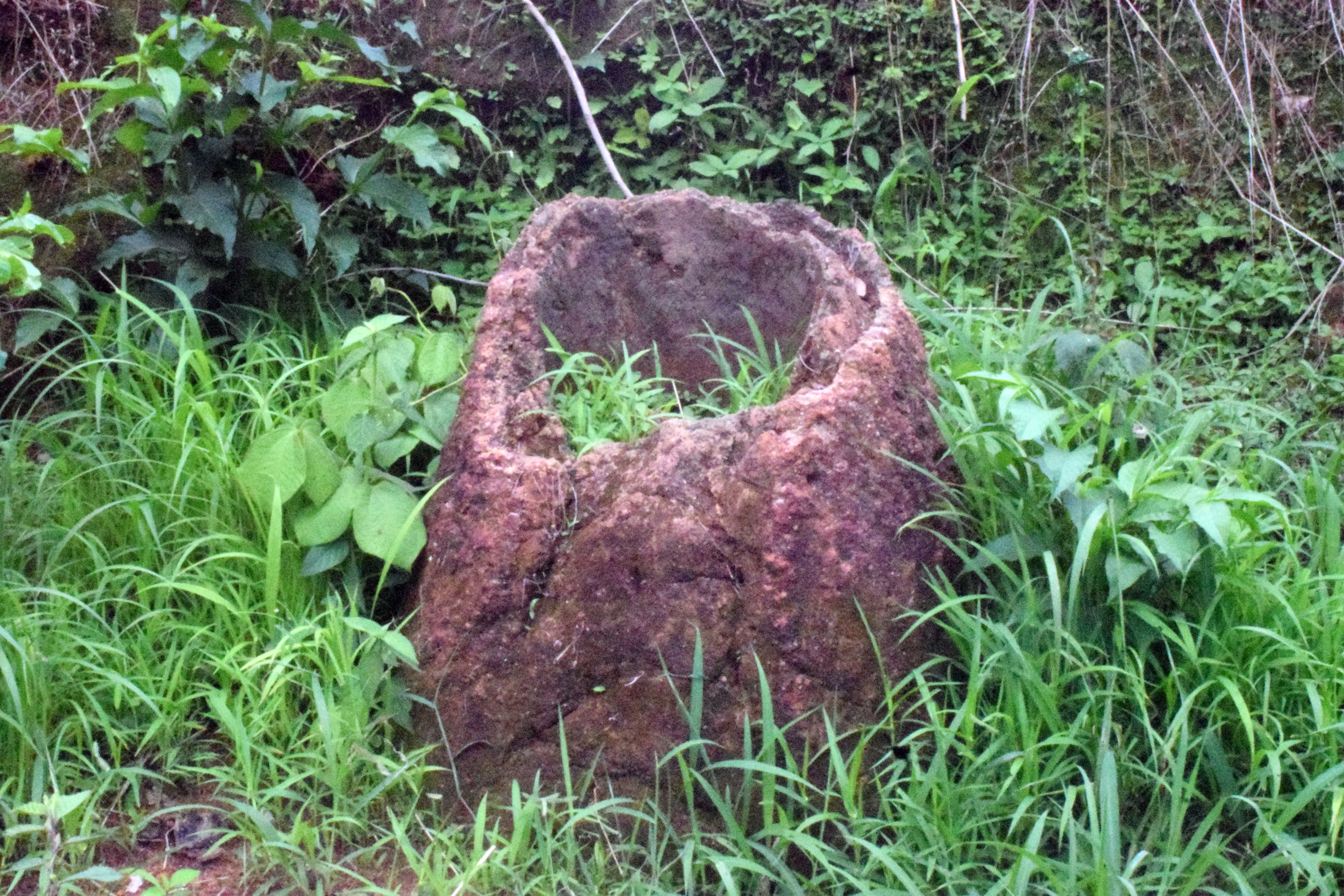
Furnace remains, Nok Village, Kaduna State

== Archaeology ==
The discovery of terracotta figurines at this location caused its name to be used for the Nok culture, of which these figurines are typical, which flourished in Nigeria in the period 1500 BC – 500 AD. The artifacts were discovered in 1943 during mining operations. The archaeologist Bernard Fagg investigated the site, and with the help of locals discovered many other artifacts. Iron smelting furnaces were also found at Nok.

A sample of carbonized wood found in the "main paddock" at Nok in 1951 was dated to around 3660 BC which dates far before the first iron smelting, though there are questions about the reliability of this conclusion.

Nok is seen as peculiar due to the discovery of both stone and iron tools found in the archaeological site but no copper tools. It is believed that Nok culture along with all of Sub-Saharan Africa skipped the copper age, suggesting that they made the leap from the Stone age to the Iron Age.

The reason for this is because the use of copper metallurgy has been dated to around 2000 BC and iron metallurgy at around 2136–1921 BC making the use of these metals predate many areas in the world which supports the independent expansion of this technology in Sub-Saharan Africa.
