= Prehistoric West Africa =

Prehistory of the West African subregion of the African continent

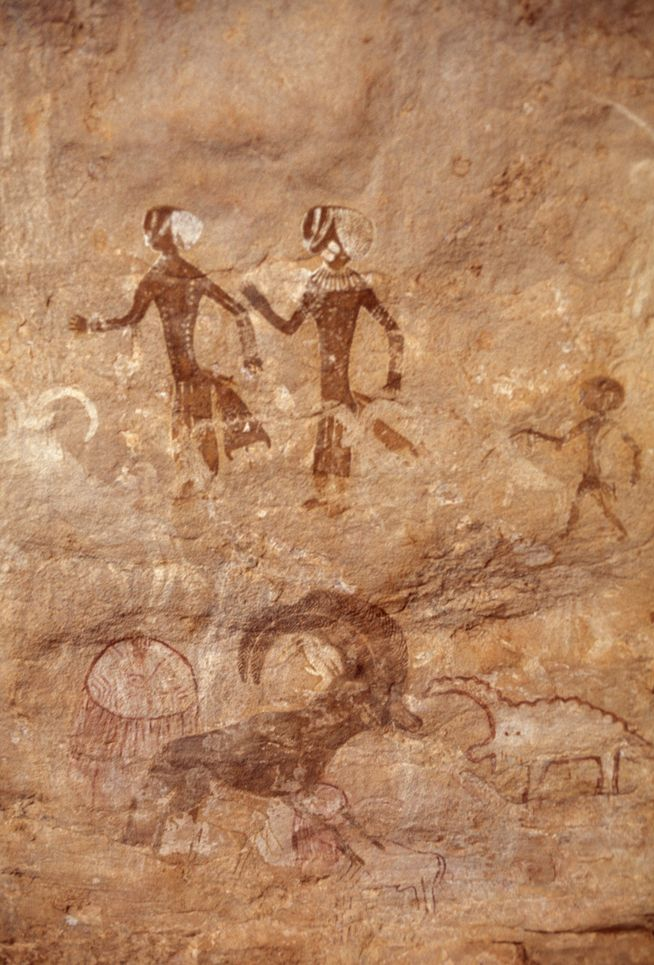
Round Head rock art figures and zoomorphic figures, including a Barbary sheep

The prehistory of West Africa timespan from the earliest human presence in the region to the emergence of the Iron Age in West Africa. West African populations were considerably mobile and interacted with one another throughout the population history of West Africa. Acheulean tool-using archaic humans may have dwelled throughout West Africa since at least between 780,000 BP and 126,000 BP (Middle Pleistocene). During the Pleistocene, Middle Stone Age peoples (e.g., Iwo Eleru people, possibly Aterians), who dwelled throughout West Africa between MIS 4 (71,000 BP) and MIS 2 (29,000 BP, Last Glacial Maximum), were gradually replaced by incoming Late Stone Age peoples, who migrated into West Africa as an increase in humid conditions resulted in the subsequent expansion of the West African forest. West African hunter-gatherers occupied western Central Africa (e.g., Shum Laka) earlier than 32,000 BP, dwelled throughout coastal West Africa by 12,000 BP, and migrated northward between 12,000 BP and 8000 BP as far as Mali, Burkina Faso, and Mauritania.

During the Holocene, Niger-Congo speakers independently created pottery in Ounjougou, Mali – the earliest pottery in Africa – by at least 9400 BCE, and along with their pottery, as well as wielding independently invented bows and arrows, migrated into the Central Sahara, which became their primary region of residence by 10,000 BP. The emergence and expansion of ceramics in the Sahara may be linked with the origin of Round Head and Kel Essuf rock art, which occupy rockshelters in the same regions (e.g., Djado, Acacus, Tadrart). Hunters in the Central Sahara farmed, stored, and cooked undomesticated central Saharan flora, underwent domestication of antelope, and domesticated and shepherded Barbary sheep. After the Kel Essuf Period and Round Head Period of the Central Sahara, the Pastoral Period followed. Some of the hunter-gatherers who created the Round Head rock art may have adopted pastoral culture, and others may have not. As a result of increasing aridification of the Green Sahara, Central Saharan hunter-gatherers and cattle herders may have used seasonal waterways as the migratory route taken to the Niger River and Chad Basin of West Africa. In 2000 BCE, "Thiaroye Woman", also known as the "Venus of Thiaroye," may have been the earliest statuette created in Sub-Saharan West Africa; it may have particularly been a fertility statuette, created in the region of Senegambia, and may be associated with the emergence of complexly organized pastoral societies in West Africa between 4000 BCE and 1000 BCE. Though possibly developed as early as 5000 BCE, Nsibidi may have also developed in 2000 BCE, as evidenced by depictions of the West African script on Ikom monoliths at Ikom, in Nigeria. Migration of Saharan peoples south of the Sahelian region resulted in seasonal interaction with and gradual absorption of West African hunter-gatherers, who primarily dwelt in the savannas and forests of West Africa. In West Africa, which may have been a major regional cradle in Africa for the domestication of crops and animals, Niger-Congo speakers domesticated the helmeted guineafowl between 5500 BP and 1300 BP; domestication of field crops occurred throughout various locations in West Africa, such as yams (Dioscorea praehensilis) in the Niger River basin between eastern Ghana and western Nigeria (northern Benin), rice (oryza glaberrima) in the Inner Niger Delta region of Mali, pearl millet (Cenchrus americanus) in northern Mali and Mauritania, and cowpeas in northern Ghana. After having persisted as late as 1000 BP, or some period of time after 1500 CE, remaining West African hunter-gatherers, many of whom dwelt in the forest-savanna region, were ultimately acculturated and admixed into the larger groups of West African agriculturalists, akin to the migratory Bantu-speaking agriculturalists and their encounters with Central African hunter-gatherers. Iron metallurgy may have been developed independently in West Africa sometime between around 3,000–1,000 BC, with archaeological sites containing iron smelting furnaces found at sites at Lejja, Nigeria (Eze-Uzomaka 2009), Opi (Holl 2009), the Nok culture, Oboui, and others.

== Climate ==
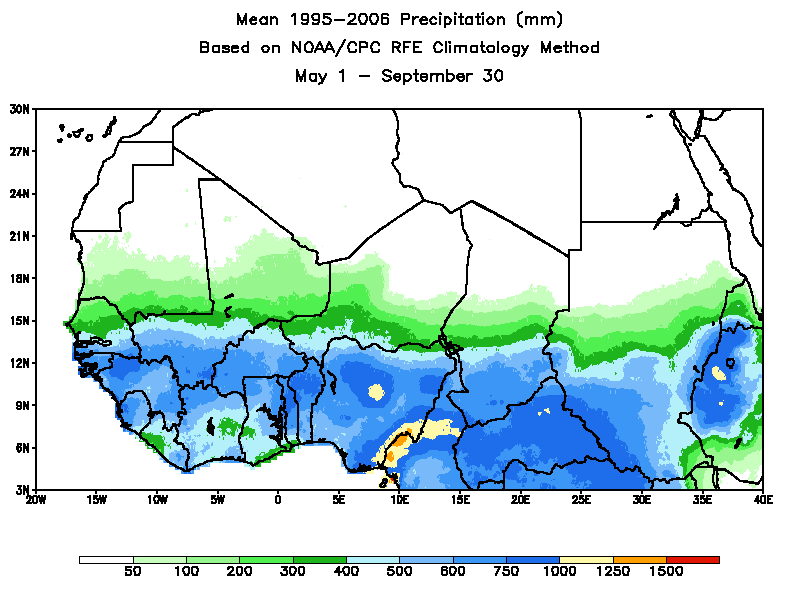
West African monsoon season

=== Early Stone Age ===
In the Falémé River Valley zone, with the exception of stadial phases and interstadial phases, there has been a fairly steady state of humidity and temperature throughout a span of 120,000 years. Additionally, for at least the previous 100,000 years, the presence of flora (e.g., trees) has remained quite consistent. Consequently, this area has remained habitable for human populations, from the Early Stone Age, through the Middle Stone Age, to the Later Stone Age. Furthermore, for the previous 100,000 years, compared to the climate of East Africa, the Pleistocene climate in West Africa has been more steady and humid.

In the Atakora mountainous zone, the Pleistocene climate has supported continuity in human habitation, from the Early Stone Age, through the Middle Stone Age, to the Later Stone Age, which spanned the previous 120,000 years.

=== Middle Stone Age ===
In the Falémé River Valley zone, with the exception of stadial phases and interstadial phases, there has been a fairly steady state of humidity and temperature throughout a span of 120,000 years. Additionally, for at least the previous 100,000 years, the presence of flora (e.g., trees) has remained quite consistent. Consequently, this area has remained habitable for human populations, from the Early Stone Age, through the Middle Stone Age, to the Later Stone Age. Furthermore, for the previous 100,000 years, compared to the climate of East Africa, the Pleistocene climate in West Africa has been more steady and humid.

In the Jos Plateau zone, the Pleistocene climate has fluctuated mostly during stadial phases and interstadial phases, throughout the previous 120,000 years; specifically, stable climate occurred between MIS 4 and MIS 2, and climate fluctuations occurred during the periods and sub-periods of MIS 1 and MIS 5. Consequently, the human habitation areas in Jos Plateau, which is only composed of Middle Stone Age sites, has been distinct in terms of culture and environment in comparison to the Falémé River Valley.

In the Atakora mountainous zone, the Pleistocene climate has supported continuity in human habitation, from the Early Stone Age, through the Middle Stone Age, to the Later Stone Age, which spanned the previous 120,000 years.

=== Later Stone Age ===
In the Falémé River Valley zone, with the exception of stadial phases and interstadial phases, there has been a fairly steady state of humidity and temperature throughout a span of 120,000 years. Additionally, for at least the previous 100,000 years, the presence of flora (e.g., trees) has remained quite consistent. Consequently, this area has remained habitable for human populations, from the Early Stone Age, through the Middle Stone Age, to the Later Stone Age. Furthermore, for the previous 100,000 years, compared to the climate of East Africa, the Pleistocene climate in West Africa has been more steady and humid.

In the Atakora mountainous zone, the Pleistocene climate has supported continuity in human habitation, from the Early Stone Age, through the Middle Stone Age, to the Later Stone Age, which spanned the previous 120,000 years.

In 15,000 BP, the West African monsoon transformed the landscape of Africa and began the Green Sahara period; greater rainfall during the summer season resulted in the growth of humid conditions (e.g., lakes, wetlands) and the savanna (e.g., grassland, shrubland) in North Africa. Between 5500 BP and 4000 BP, the Green Sahara period ended.

During the 1st millennium cal BCE, between the Later Stone Age and Early Iron Age, the environment was conducive for the growth of pearl millet in the basin area of Lake Chad.

=== Pastoral Neolithic ===
By 4500 BP, sources of water in the Sahara had dried, and subsequently, drought occurred, which resulted in a decrease in the presence of humidity in the region. Concurrent with the decrease in Saharan humidity, between 3500 BP and 2500 BP, the Sahel underwent an increase in humidity within the region.

== Early Stone Age ==
Acheulean tool-using archaic humans may have dwelled throughout West Africa since at least between 780,000 BP and 126,000 BP (Middle Pleistocene).

At Ounjougou, in Mali, a yet-to-be-dated Lower Paleolithic economy (e.g., pebble cores, pebble tools, polyhedrons, spheroids, sub-spheroids), with unpreserved Acheulean implements (e.g., cleavers, handaxes), is present.

== Middle Stone Age ==
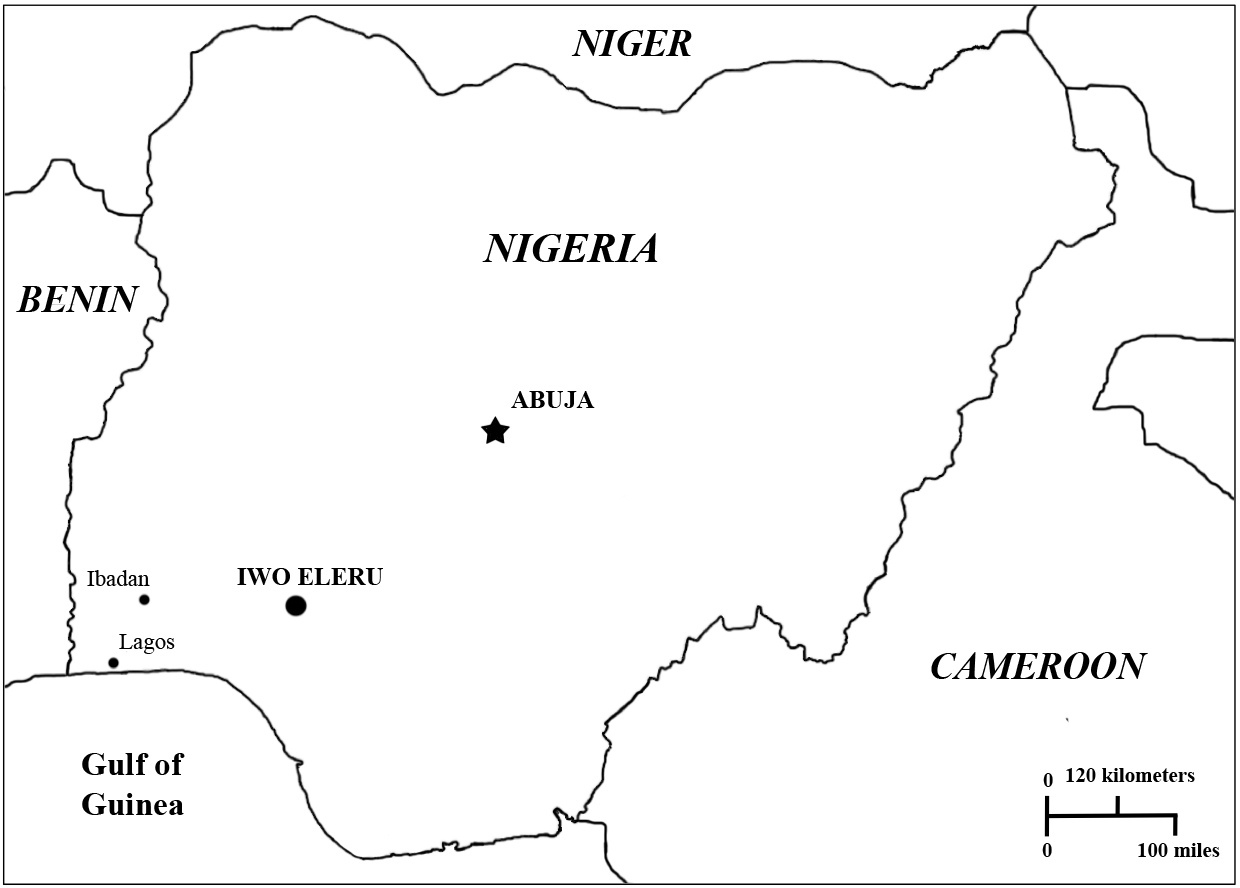
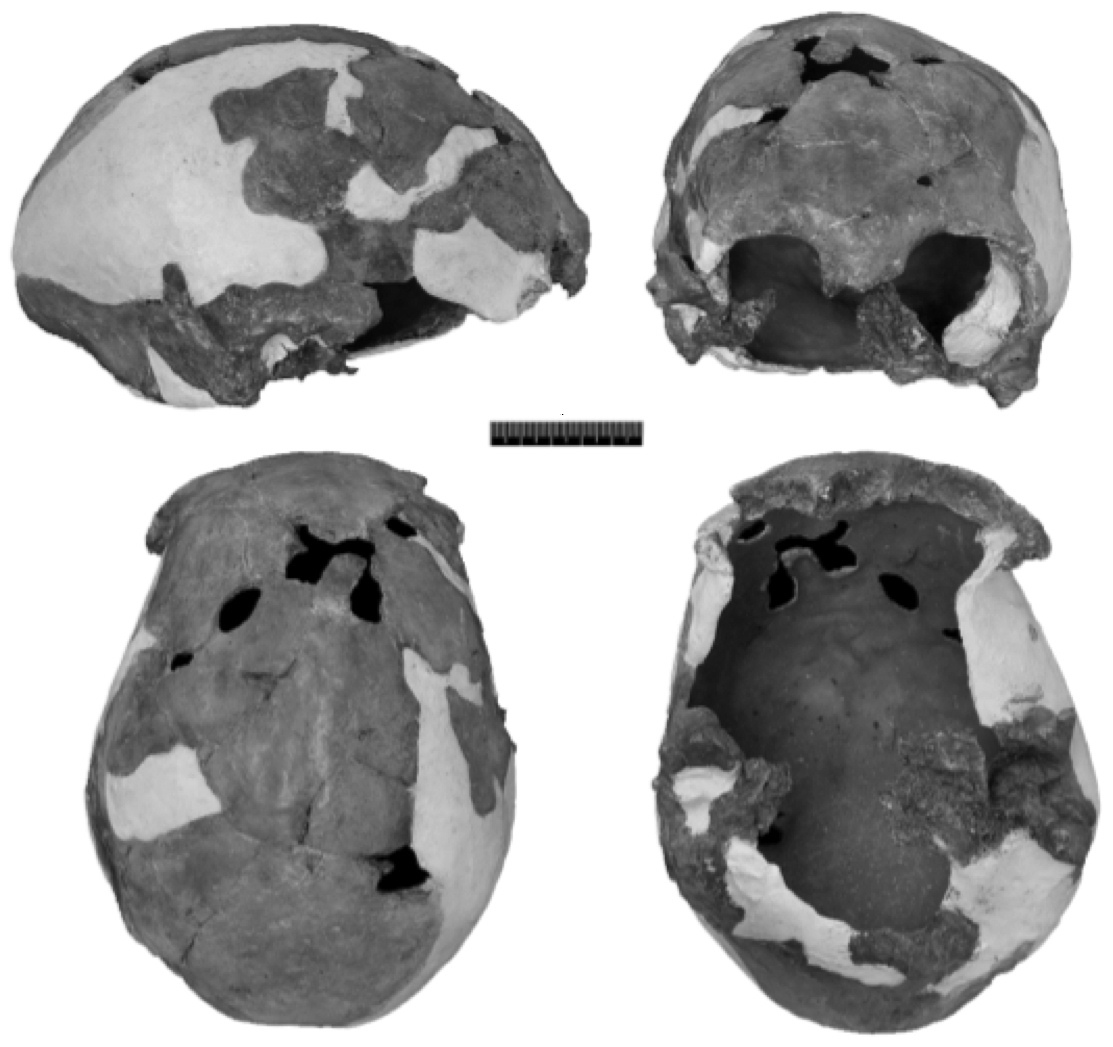
Iwo Eleru site and Iwo Eleru skull

Middle Stone Age West Africans may have dwelled at Ounjougou, Mali (71,000 BP – 59,000 BP, 59,000 BP – 28,000 BP), Faleme Valley, Senegal (Late MIS 5), Tiemassas, Senegal (62,000 BP – 25,000 BP), Birimi, Ghana (50,000 BP – 20,000 BP), Missira, Senegal (MIS 4), Toumboura, Senegal (33,000 BP), Laminia, Gambia (24,000 BP – 21,000 BP), Ndiayène Pendao, Senegal (11,600 BP), and Saxonomunya (11,000 BP), near Falémé, Mali. There is also scant evidence of Middle Stone Age settlement at Ounjougou, Mali between 191,000 BP – 130,000 BP.

Aside the scant evidence, Middle Stone Age West Africans likely dwelled continuously in West Africa between MIS 4 and MIS 2 and likely were not present in West Africa before MIS 5. Amid MIS 5, Middle Stone Age West Africans may have migrated across the West Sudanian savanna and continued to reside in the region (e.g., West Sudanian savanna, West African Sahel). In the Late Pleistocene, Middle Stone Age West Africans began to dwell along parts of the forest and coastal region of West Africa (e.g., Tiemassas, Senegal). More specifically, by at least 61,000 BP, Middle Stone Age West Africans may have begun to migrate south of the West Sudanian savanna, and, by at least 25,000 BP, may have begun to dwell near the coast of West Africa. Amid aridification in MIS 5 and regional change of climate in MIS 4, in the Sahara and the Sahel, Aterians may have migrated southward into West Africa (e.g., Baie du Levrier, Mauritania; Tiemassas, Senegal; Lower Senegal River Valley).

In 35,000 BP, Middle Stone Age West Africans and West African archaic humans may have admixed with one another, resulting in the development of the Iwo Eleru people (e.g., Iwo Eleru skull), who may have remained rather isolated in West Africa, and thus, remained distinct from both contemporaneous Africans in the Sahara and from any other African populations amid the transitory period between the Pleistocene and Holocene.

== Later Stone Age ==
=== 32,000 BP – 20,000 BP (30,000 BCE – 18,000 BCE) ===
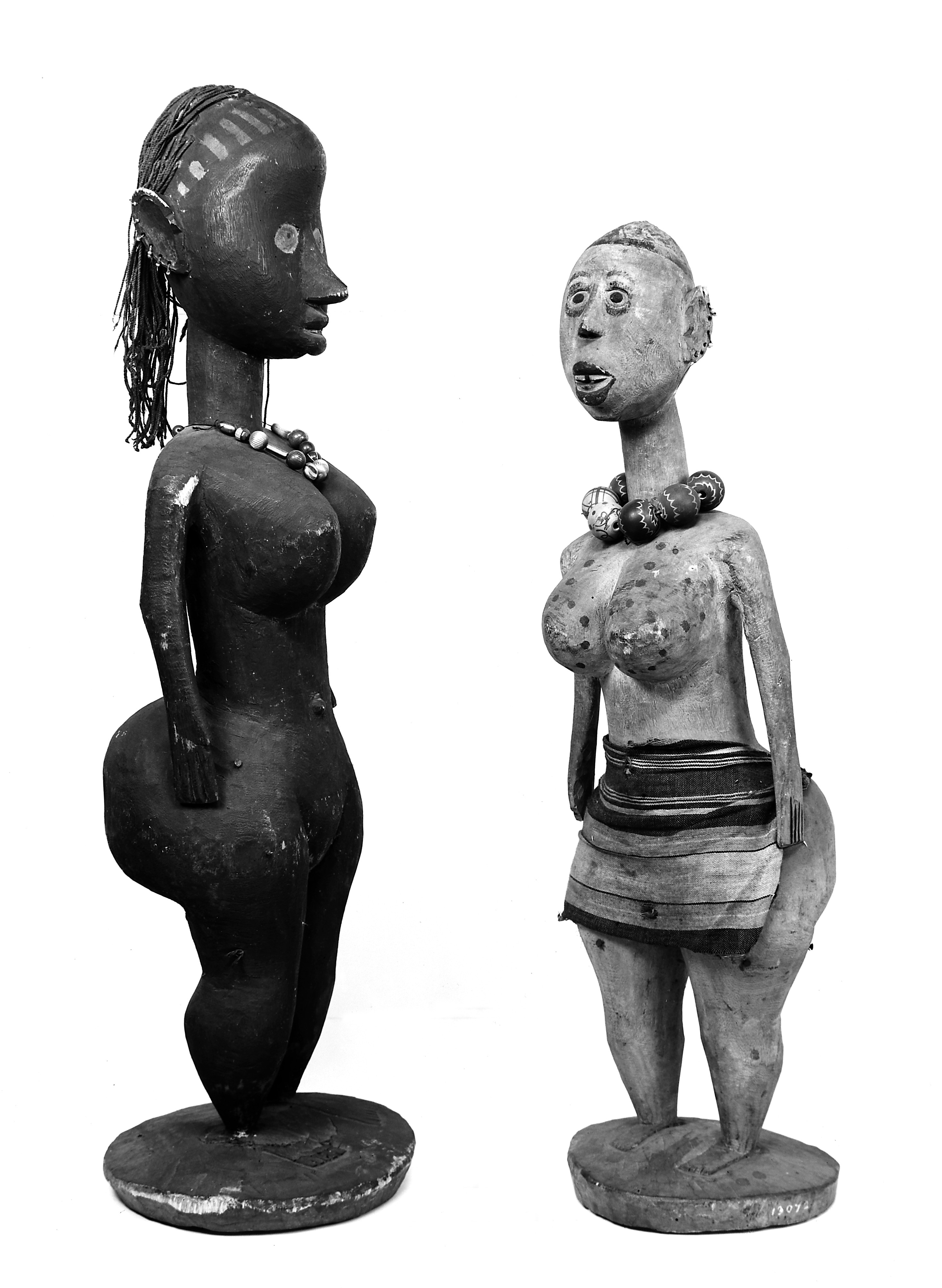
Representations of West African hunter-gatherers from the Dahomey region of Benin

Earlier than 32,000 BP, or by 30,000 BP, Late Stone Age West African hunter-gatherers were dwelling in the forests of western Central Africa (e.g., earlier than 32,000 BP at de Maret in Shum Laka, 12,000 BP at Mbi Crater). An excessively dry Ogolian period occurred, spanning from 20,000 BP to 12,000 BP. By 15,000 BP, the number of settlements made by Middle Stone Age West Africans decreased as there was an increase in humid conditions, expansion of the West African forest, and increase in the number of settlements made by Late Stone Age West African hunter-gatherers. Macrolith-using late Middle Stone Age peoples (e.g., the possibly archaic human admixed or late-persisting early modern human Iwo Eleru fossils of the late Middle Stone Age), who dwelled in Central Africa, to western Central Africa, to West Africa, were displaced by microlith-using Late Stone Age Africans (e.g., non-archaic human admixed Late Stone Age Shum Laka fossils dated between 7000 BP and 3000 BP) as they migrated from Central Africa, to western Central Africa, into West Africa. Between 16,000 BP and 12,000 BP, Late Stone Age West Africans began dwelling in the eastern and central forested regions (e.g., Ghana, Ivory Coast, Nigeria; between 18,000 BP and 13,000 BP at Temet West and Asokrochona in the southern region of Ghana, 13,050 ± 230 BP at Bingerville in the southern region of Ivory Coast, 11,200 ± 200 BP at Iwo Eleru in Nigeria) of West Africa. By 11,000 BP, the late settlement made by Middle Stone Age West Africans and earliest settlement made by Late Stone Age West African hunter-gatherers emerged in the westernmost region (e.g., Falémé Valley, Senegal) of West Africa. Middle Stone Age West Africans and Late Stone Age West African hunter-gatherers likely did not become admixed with one another and were culturally and ecologically distinct from one another.

=== 20,000 BP – 10,000 BP (18,000 BCE – 8000 BCE) ===
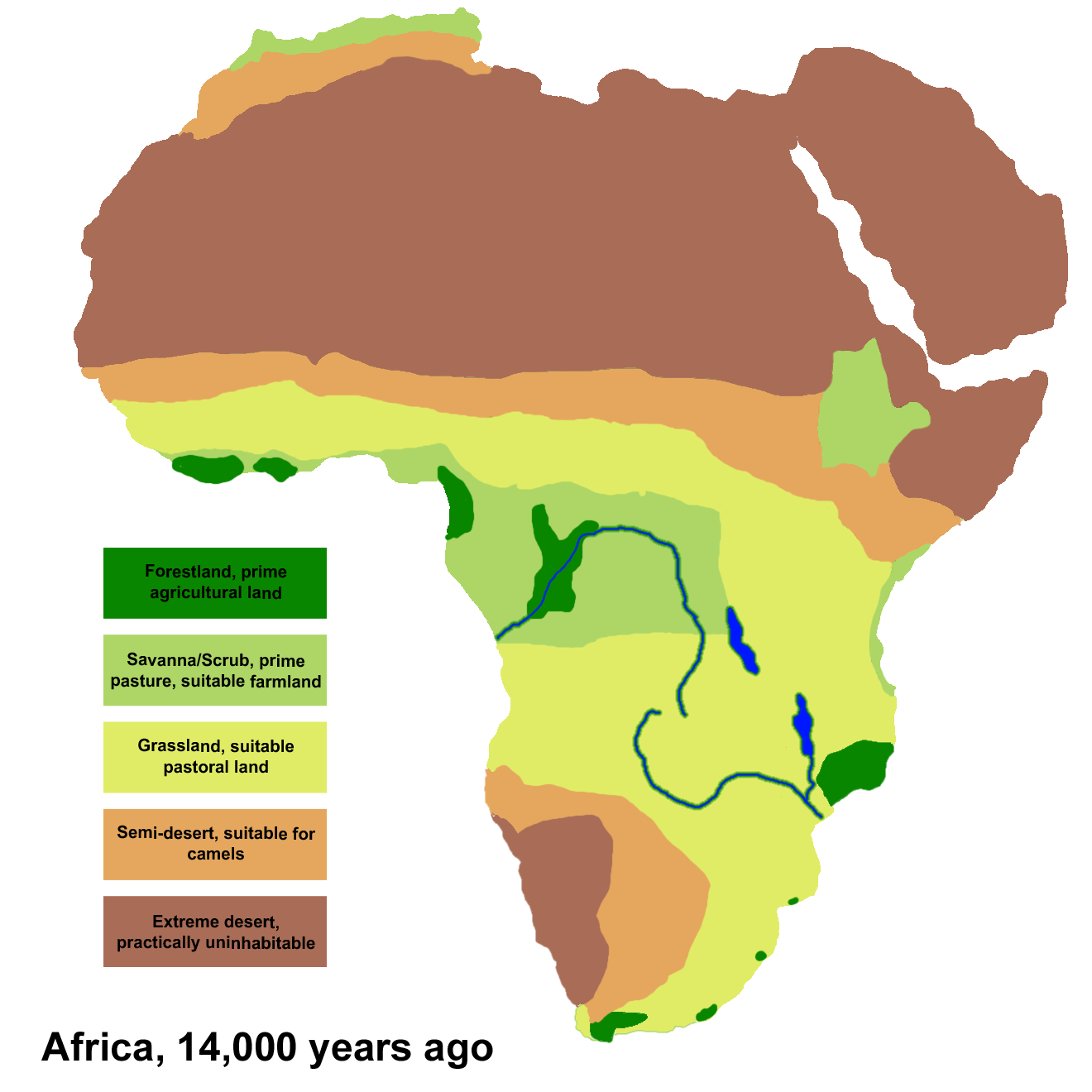
Africa in 12,000 BCE

According to MacDonald (2003), the regional birthplace of Nilo-Saharan speakers and Niger-Congo speakers spanned from the Nile Valley to the Maghreb, after the Aterian period. In 20,000 BP, amid the Late Pleistocene, Proto-Niger-Saharan speakers, who are identified as Mechtoids, persisted along the coasts and in the mountainous areas of North Africa. Between 12,000 BP and 10,000 BP, amid the Holocene, Niger-Saharan speakers migrated southward into the Sahara and linguistic divergence began to increase; subsequently, they gradually encountered, assimilated, and absorbed West African populations that persisted along coastal West Africa. Libyco-Berber epigraphy, while possibly being composed in playfulness, as a form of code, or as an unknown language unrelated to modern Berber languages, may have also been composed in a Nilo-Saharan language.

As of 19,000 years ago, Africans, bearing haplogroup E1b1a-V38, likely traversed across the Sahara, from east to west.

Around 18,000 BP, the ancestors of Mende people, along with Gambian peoples, grew in population size.

The Taforalts of Morocco, who have been radiocarbon dated between 15,100 cal BP and 13,900 cal BP, and were found to be 63.5% Natufian, were also found to be 36.5% Sub-Saharan African (e.g., Hadza), which is drawn out, most of all, by West Africans (e.g. Yoruba, Mende). In addition to having similarity with the remnant of a more basal Sub-Saharan African lineage (e.g., a basal West African lineage shared between Yoruba and Mende peoples), the Sub-Saharan African DNA in the Taforalt people of the Iberomaurusian culture may be best represented by modern West Africans.

In 15,000 BP, Niger-Congo speakers may have migrated from the Sahelian region of West Africa, along the Senegal River, and introduced haplogroup L2a1 into North Africa, resulting in modern Mauritanian peoples and Berbers of Tunisia inheriting it.

Between 12,000 BP and 8000 BP, West African hunter-gatherers then likely migrated from coastal West Africa, toward the north of West Africa as far as Mali, Burkina Faso, and Mauritania, as evidenced by their microlithic industries (e.g., quartz, sandstone). Amid the early period of the Holocene, West African hunter-gatherers may have had Sahelian stone industries, from Senegal to Niger, which, while it may have derived from a distinct Sub-Saharan African stone tradition, may have derived from the Shum Laka stone tradition of Cameroon.

Niger-Congo migration may have been from Kordofan, Sudan into West Africa or West Africa into Kordofan. Possibly from Kordofan, Niger-Congo speakers (e.g., Mande), accompanied by undomesticated helmeted guineafowls, may have traversed into West Africa, domesticated the helmeted guineafowls by 3000 BCE, and via the Bantu expansion, traversed into other parts of Sub-Saharan Africa (e.g., Central Africa, East Africa, Southern Africa).

According to Steverding (2020), Near the African Great Lakes, schistosomes (e.g., S. mansoni, S. haematobium) underwent evolution. Subsequently, there was an expansion alongside the Nile River. From Egypt, the presence of schistosomes expanded into Western Africa and then subsequently to Central and Southern Africa. Whether this was specifically due to the migration of Yoruba people, into Western Africa as well as the migratory Bantu-speaking peoples, into the rest of Sub-Saharan Africa (e.g., Southern Africa, Central Africa) is uncertain.

In the 10th millennium BCE, Niger-Congo speakers developed pyrotechnology and employed subsistence strategy at Ounjougou, Mali. Prior to 9400 BCE, Niger-Congo speakers independently created and used matured ceramic technology (e.g., pottery, pots) to contain and cook grains (e.g., Digitaria exilis, pearl millet); ethnographically and historically, West African women have been the creators of pottery in most West African ceramic traditions and their production of ceramics is closely associated with creativity and fertility. Amid the tenth millennium BCE, microlith-using West Africans migrated into and dwelt in Ounjougou alongside earlier residing West Africans in Ounjougou. Among two existing cultural areas, earlier residing West Africans in Ounjougou were of a cultural area encompassing the Sahara region (e.g., Tenere, Niger/Chad; Air, Niger; Acacus, Libya/Algeria; Tagalagal, Niger; Temet, Niger) of Africa and microlith-using West Africans were of a cultural area encompassing the forest region of West Africa.

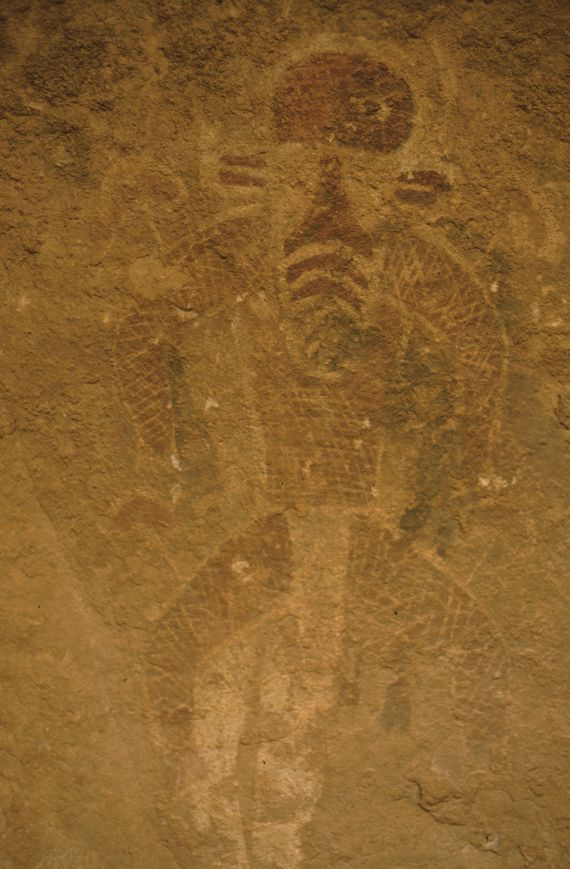
Round Head figure wearing a Barbary sheep-styled mask

Following the Ogolian period, between the late 10th millennium BCE and the early 9th millennium BCE, the creators of the Ounjougou pottery – the earliest pottery in Africa – migrated, along with their pottery, from Ounjougou, Mali into the Central Sahara. The emergence and expansion of ceramics in the Sahara may be linked with the origin of both the Round Head and Kel Essuf rock art, which occupy rockshelters in the same regions (e.g., Djado, Acacus, Tadrart) as well as have a common resemblance (e.g., traits, shapes). Whether or not Ounjougou ceramic culture spread as far as Bir Kiseiba, Egypt, which had pottery that resembled Ounjougou pottery, had implements used for grinding like at Ounjougou, and was followed by subsequent ceramic cultures (e.g., Wadi el Akhdar, Sarurab, Nabta Playa), remains to be determined. Between 8200 BCE and 6400 BCE, Central Saharan hunter-gatherers of Libya (e.g., Takarkori, Uan Afuda) gathered a diverse selection of flora (e.g., aquatic plants from lakes, grasses from savanna grasslands) and utilized ceramic pots to process and cook the flora. By 10,000 BP, the primary region of residence for Niger-Congo speakers, who wielded bows and arrows, may have been the southern region of the Central Sahara. Amid an early period of the Holocene, semi-settled Epipaleolithic and Mesolithic hunters, who created a refined material culture (e.g., stone tools, decorated pottery) as early as 10,000 BP, also created the engraved Kel Essuf and painted Round Head rock art styles located in the region (e.g., some in the Acacus, some in the Tadrart, some in the Jebel Uweinat) of Libya, in the region (e.g., some in the Tadrart, most abundant in Tassili n'Ajjer) of Algeria, in the region (e.g., Djado) of Nigeria, and the region (e.g., Djado) of Niger. Amid the early Sahara, Round Head rock artists, who had a sophisticated culture and engaged in the activity of hunting and gathering, also developed pottery, utilized vegetation, and managed animals. The cultural importance of shepherded Barbary sheep (Ammotragus lervia) is shown via their presence in Round Head rock art throughout the Central Sahara (e.g., Libyan region of Tadrart Acacus, Algerian region of Tassili n'Ajjer). Barbary sheep were corralled in stone enclosures near Uan Afuda cave. From up to 9500 BP, this continued until the beginning of the Pastoral Neolithic in the Sahara. Between 7500 BCE and 3500 BCE, amid the Green Sahara, undomesticated central Saharan flora were farmed, stored, and cooked, and domesticated animals (e.g., Barbary sheep) were milked and managed, by hunter-gatherers near the Takarkori rockshelter, which is representative of the broader Sahara; this continued until the beginning of the Pastoral Neolithic in the Sahara.

Between 11,000 BP and 10,000 BP, the population ancestral to Yoruba people and Esan people grew in population size.

As early as 11,000 years ago, Sub-Saharan West Africans, bearing macrohaplogroup L (e.g., L1b1a11, L1b1a6a, L1b1a8, L1b1a9a1, L2a1k, L3d1b1a), may have migrated through North Africa and into Europe, mostly into southern Europe (e.g., Iberia).

In West Africa, the Holocene Wet Phase ushered in expanding rainforest and wooded savannah from Senegal to Cameroon. Between 9000 BCE and 5000 BCE, Niger-Congo speakers independently developed agriculture (e.g., Yams/Dioscorea). Oil palm and raffia palm were domesticated as early as 9000 BCE. Two seed plants, black-eyed peas and voandzeia (African groundnuts) were domesticated, followed by okra and kola nuts. Prior to 5000 BCE, their agricultural practices were spread throughout the woodland savanna, and afterward, were introduced southward into the West African forest. Since most of the plants grew in the forest, the Niger-Congo speakers invented polished stone axes for clearing forest.

=== 10,000 BP – 7500 BP (8000 BCE – 5500 BCE) ===
During the Green Sahara, at Gobero, there were two groups: the Kiffians and the Tenerians. Between 10,000 BP and 8000 BP, the Kiffians hunted (e.g., harpoons) undomesticated animals, constructed stylized (e.g., zig zags, wavy lines) pottery, and fished (e.g., fish hooks). Between 7000 BP and 4500 BP, the Tenerians hunted, fished, herded cattle, and constructed pointillistic-designed ceramics.

In the steppes and savannah of the Sahara and Sahel, the Nilo-Saharan speakers started to collect and domesticate wild millet and sorghum between 8000 BCE and 6000 BCE. Later, gourds, watermelons, castor beans, and cotton were also collected and domesticated. The people started capturing wild cattle and holding them in circular thorn hedges, resulting in domestication.

Amid the early Holocene Wet Phase, Asselar man may have occupied Asselar, in the Saharan region of northern Mali, near what was likely a lake, between 9500 BP and 7000 BP.

During the early period of the Holocene, in 9000 BP, Khoisan-related peoples admixed with the ancestors of the Igbo people, possibly in the western Sahara.

By 8000 BP, canoes (e.g., Dufuna canoe) were being utilized in West Africa. While some Niger-Congo speakers may have utilized bows and arrows to hunt, other Niger-Congo speakers (e.g., Atlantic, Bak, Kru, Kwa, Ịjọ), who diverged from the hunters, may have utilized canoes to search for resources in and along the river systems, toward the seacoast, of West Africa. In Western Africa, there may have been independent invention of bows and arrows.

== Pastoral Neolithic ==
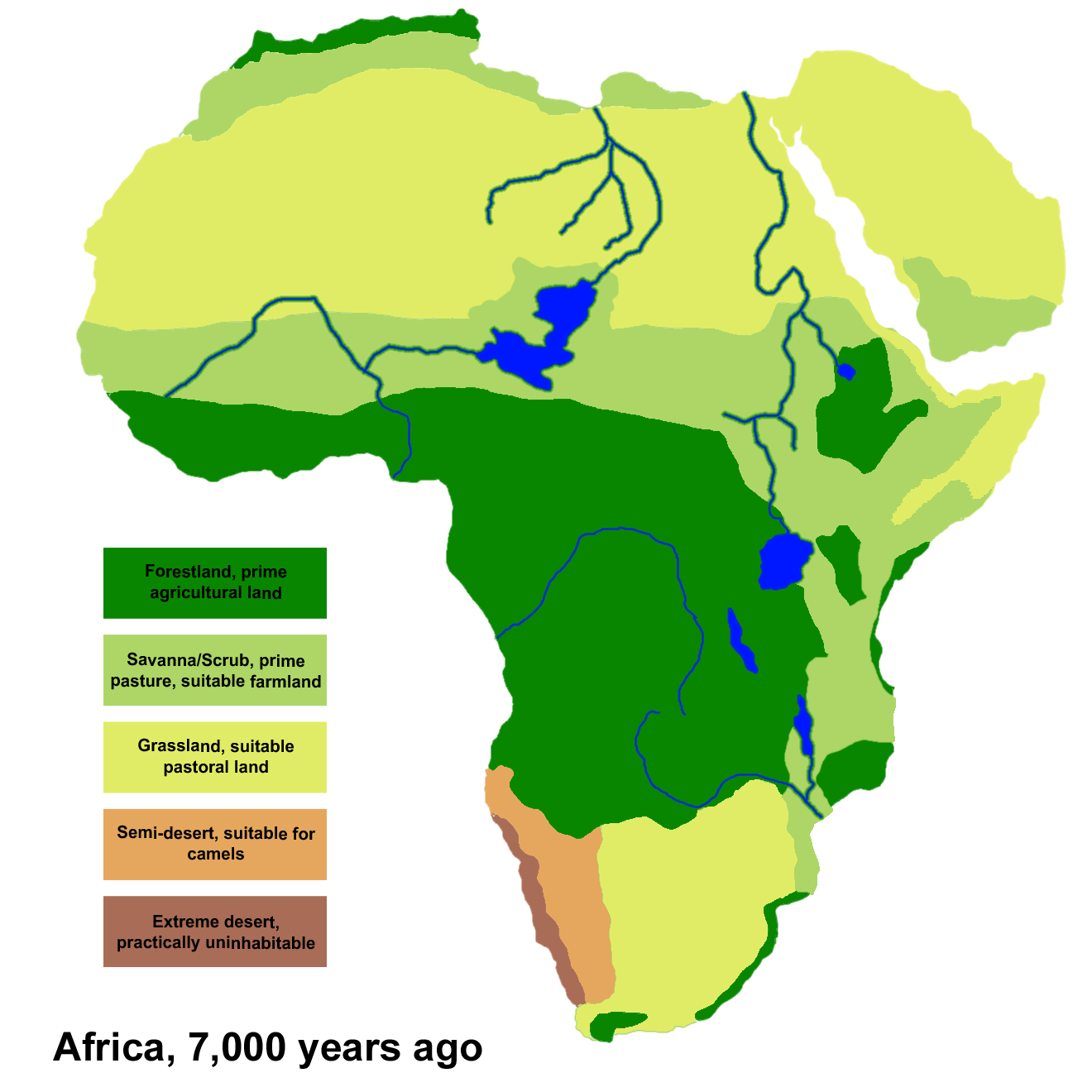
Africa in 5000 BCE

=== 7500 BP – 6500 BP (5500 BCE – 4500 BCE) ===
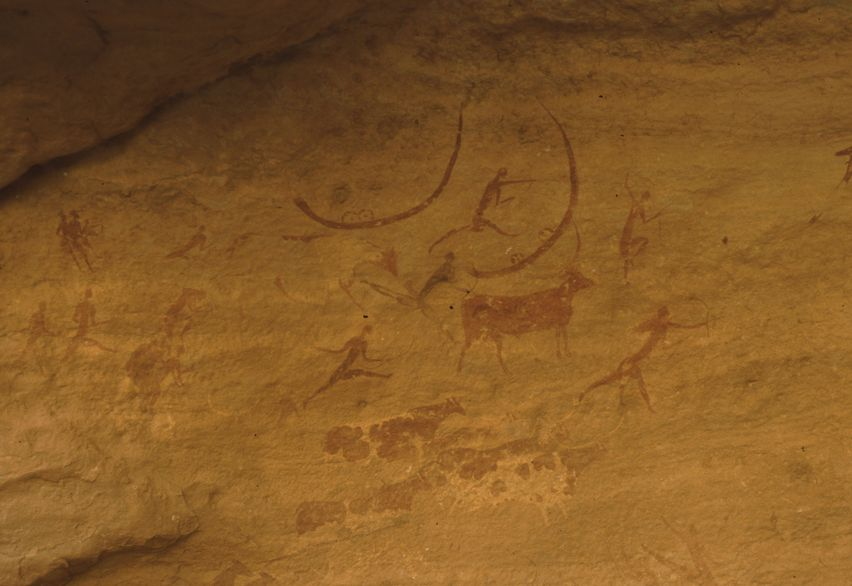
Warrior/Shepherd figures and animals of the Pastoral period

As cattle pastoralism (also known as the African cattle complex) had endured in the Sahara since 7500 BP, amid the Pastoral period, Central Saharan hunters and herders may have lived together in a common area for a long period of time. The Round Head painting tradition was brought to its formal conclusion as the Green Sahara underwent desertification. Desertification may have resulted in migrations from the Central Saharan region, where the Round Head paintings are located, toward Lake Chad, the Niger Delta, and the Nile Valley. While some migrated south of the Sahara, other Central Saharan hunter-gatherers may have taken on the custom of pastoralism (e.g., herding domesticated cattle and goats). Meanwhile, as late as 2500 BP in the Central Sahara, some of the creators of the Round Head rock art may have continued to persist as hunters.

With the exception of the guineafowl and very recent experiments with the domestication of local wild species, none of the domestic animals kept in west Africa are indigenous to the region. The first pastoral populations in Africa came from Northeast Africa and gradually migrated Southwest into Sub-Saharan West Africa during the onset of the mid to late Holocene dry phase.

Amid the Green Sahara, the mutation for sickle cell originated in the Sahara or in the northwest forest region of western Central Africa (e.g., Cameroon) by at least 7,300 years ago, though possibly as early as 22,000 years ago. The ancestral sickle cell haplotype to modern haplotypes (e.g., Cameroon/Central African Republic and Benin/Senegal haplotypes) may have first arose in the ancestors of modern West Africans, bearing haplogroups E1b1a1-L485 and E1b1a1-U175 or their ancestral haplogroup E1b1a1-M4732. West Africans (e.g., Yoruba and Esan of Nigeria), bearing the Benin sickle cell haplotype, may have migrated through the northeastern region of Africa into the western region of Arabia. West Africans (e.g., Mende of Sierra Leone), bearing the Senegal sickle cell haplotype, may have migrated into Mauritania (77% modern rate of occurrence) and Senegal (100%); they may also have migrated across the Sahara, into North Africa, and from North Africa, into Southern Europe, Turkey, and a region near northern Iraq and southern Turkey. Some may have migrated and introduced the Senegal and Benin sickle cell haplotypes into Basra, Iraq, where both occur equally. West Africans, bearing the Benin sickle cell haplotype, may have migrated into the northern region of Iraq (69.5%), Jordan (80%), Lebanon (73%), Oman (52.1%), and Egypt (80.8%).

According to Roger Blench, paleobotanical analysis reveals evidence of an early material culture connection between ancient Egypt and Sub-Saharan Africa. The direction of transmission of these crops were from Sub-Saharan West Africa into ancient Egypt. Some of the plants that were analyzed were citrullus lanatus, or egusi melon/watermelon, found in the tomb of King Tutankhamun, cajanus cajan, or pigeon pea, found in a 12th Dynasty tomb at Thebes, vigna unguiculata, or cowpea, found in ancient Egypt during the 5th Dynasty, and ricinus communis, or castor bean, found in Pre-Dynastic contexts.

Approximated to the Neolithic, there were "Negroid" skeletal remains found in West Africa. At El Guettara, Mali, there were two individuals found. At Karkarichinkat South, Mali, a skull was found. At Ibalaghen, Mali, there was a cranium found, which has been specifically dated between 7000 BP and 4000 BP. At Tin Lalou, Mali, there was a cranium and mandible found, which have been specifically dated between 7000 BP and 4000 BP. At Tamaya Mellet, Niger, there were 12 individuals found, which have been specifically dated between 7000 BP and 4000 BP.

Though possibly developed as early as 5000 BCE, Nsibidi may have developed in 2000 BCE, as evidenced by depictions of the West African script on Ikom monoliths at Ikom, in Nigeria.

Preceded by assumed earlier sites in the Eastern Sahara, tumuli with megalithic monuments developed as early as 4700 BCE in the Saharan region of Niger. These megalithic monuments in the Saharan region of Niger and the Eastern Sahara may have served as antecedents for the mastabas and pyramids of ancient Egypt. During Predynastic Egypt, tumuli were present at various locations (e.g., Naqada, Helwan). The prehistoric tradition of monarchic tumuli-building is shared by both the West African Sahel and the Middle Nile regions. Ancient Egyptian pyramids of the early dynastic period and Meroitic Kush pyramids are recognized by Faraji (2022) as part of and derived from an earlier architectural "Sudanic-Sahelian" tradition of monarchic tumuli, which are characterized as "earthen pyramids" or "proto-pyramids." Faraji (2022) characterized Nobadia as the "last pharaonic culture of the Nile Valley" and described mound tumuli as being "the first architectural symbol of the sovereign's return and reunification with the primordial mound upon his death." Faraji (2022) indicates that there may have been a cultural expectation of "postmortem resurrection" associated with tumuli in the funerary traditions of the West African Sahel (e.g., northern Ghana, northern Nigeria, Mali) and Nile Valley (e.g., Ballana, Qustul, Kerma, Kush). Based on artifacts found in the tumuli from West Africa and Nubia, there may have been "a highly developed corporate ritual in which the family members of the deceased brought various items as offerings and tribute to the ancestors" buried in the tumuli and the tumuli may have "served as immense shrines of spiritual power for the populace to ritualize and remember their connection to the ancestral lineage as consecrated in the royal tomb."

In his analysis of West African cultures, Christopher Ehret found numerous examples of a Sudanic sacral kingship that originated in the Middle Nile. It is likely that it spread to the Niger Bend in West Africa from Nilo-Saharan languages speakers, who arrived there as early as the 6th millennium BCE. Some of these civilizations and cultures defined by Sudanic sacral kingship were Wadai, located east of the Lake Tchad, Kwarafara which dominated the Benue River from the 13th to 18th century CE, the 14th century CE Nri civilization, northeast of Igala in Nigeria, the medieval Songhay empire, built from Gao, the Hausa city-states, and the Soninké founders of the Wagadou empire.

According to Michael Rowlands, there are basic commonalities between the function of Pharaohs and the Mfon of the Bamiléké people in the possession of negative and highly dangerous powers that could be put to 'good use' in maintaining order. Both the pharaoh and Bamileke chief authorize executions while mediating between principles of violence and legitimacy. The focus is very distinctively on the king's body as autochthonous container and a conduit for the dispersal of substances. Rowlands posits that the ancient Egyptians and Sub-Saharan populations such as the Bamiléké share a proto cosmogony derived from the same ancient African ancestors. For Rowlands, the role of embodiment and containment of life giving/destructive forces has a certain relevance for understanding the distinctive features of contemporary African politics in the process of sparking an African renaissance to construct a new African history, identity and culture and to reassert the notion of Africanness.

Between the 8th millennia BCE and the 4th millennia BCE, riverine farmers and savanna herders traversed the interconnected region of the Middle Nile Valley. In the Saharan-Sahelian and Middle Nile Valley regions, dotted wavy line and wavy line pottery, which was produced between the 8th millennia BCE and the 4th millennia BCE (late Neolithic and early Bronze Age), preceded the emergence of monarchic tumuli; the spread of the pottery spanned from the savanna region to the eastern Saharan region, and from Mauritania to the Red Sea, which supports the conclusions of trade between the regions and their interconnectedness. Wavy-line pottery developed six ceramic subvariants and dotted wavy-line pottery developed three ceramic subvariants; the locations for the earliest development of both 8th millennium BCE potteries were at Sagai and Sarurab in Sudan. Wavy-line pottery spread throughout multiple locations (e.g., mostly in Central Nile; some in Hoggar Mountains, southern Algeria, Delibo Cave, Chad, Jebel Eghei, Chad, Tibesti, Chad, and Adrar Madet, Niger) in Africa. Dotted wavy-line pottery spread throughout multiple locations (e.g., Ennedi Plateau, Niger Plateau, and Wadi Howar of Saharan-Sahelian region, interconnecting the regions of the Middle Nile River, Lake Chad, and Benue-Niger River) in Africa as well. Both potteries also spread along a north-to-west regional axis (e.g., Wadi Howar, Ennedi Plateau, Chad, Jebel Uweinat, Gilf Kebir, Egypt) near the Saharan regions of Sudan and Egypt. The tumuli from the kingdom of Kerma serve as a regional intermediary between the regions of the Nile River and the Niger River.

The "Classical Sudanese" monarchic tumuli-building tradition, which lasted in Sudan (e.g., Kerma, Makuria, Meroe, Napata, Nobadia) until the early period of the 6th century CE as well as in West Africa and Central Africa until the 14th century CE, notably preceded the spread of Islam into the West African and Sahelian regions of Africa. According to al-Bakrī, "the construction of tumuli and the accompanying rituals was a religious endeavor that emanated from the other elements" that he described, such as "sorcerers, sacred groves, idols, offerings to the dead, and the "tombs of their kings."" Faraji (2022) indicated that the early dynastic period of ancient Egypt, Kerma of Kush, and the Nobadian culture of Ballana were similar to al-Bakrī's descriptions of the Mande tumuli practices of ancient Ghana. A characteristic of divine kingship sometimes includes monarchic funerary practices (e.g., Ancient Egyptian funerary practices). In the lake region of Niger, two human burial sites included funerary rooms with graves that contain various bones (e.g., human, animal) and items (e.g., beads, ornaments, weapons). In the Inland Niger Delta, 11th century CE and 15th century CE tumuli at El Oualedji and Koï Gourrey contained various bones (e.g., human, horse), human items (e.g., beads, bracelets, rings), and animal items (e.g., bells, harnesses, plaques). Cultural similarities were also found with a Malinke king of Gambia, who along with his senior queen, human subjects within his kingdom, and his weapons, were buried in his home under a large mound the size of the house, as described by V. Fernandes. Levtzion also acknowledged the cultural similarities between the monarchic tumuli-building traditions and practices (e.g., monumental Senegambian megaliths) of West Africa, such as Senegambia, Inland Niger Delta, and Mali, and the Nile Valley; these monarchic tumuli-building practices span the Sudanian savanna as manifestations of a trans-Sahelian common culture and heritage. From the 5th millennium BCE to the 14th century CE, earthen and stone tumuli were developed between Senegambia and Chad. Among 10,000 burial mounds in Senegambia, 3,000 megalithic burial mounds in Senegambia were constructed between 200 BCE and 100 CE, and 7,000 earthen burial mounds in Senegal were constructed in the 2nd millennium CE. Between 1st century CE and 15th century CE, megalithic monuments without tumuli were constructed. Megalithic and earthen Senegambian tumuli, which may have been constructed by the Wolof people (Serer people) or Sosse people (Mande peoples). Sudanese tumuli (e.g., Kerma, C-Group), which date to the mid-3rd millennium BCE, share cultural similarities with Senegambian tumuli. Between the 6th century CE and 14th century CE, stone tumuli circles, which at a single site usually encircle a burial site of half-meter that is covered by a burial mound, were constructed in Komaland; the precursors for this 3rd millennium BCE tumuli style of Komaland, Ghana and Senegambia are regarded by Faraji (2022) to be Kerma Kush and the A-Group culture of ancient Nubia. While the stele-circled burial mounds of C-Group culture of Nubia are regarded as precursors for the megalithic burial mounds of Senegambia, Kerma tumuli are regarded as precursors for the stone tumuli circles of Komaland. Based on a founding narrative of the Hausa people, Faraji (2022) concludes the possibility of the "pre-Islamic rulers of Hausaland" being a "dynasty of female monarchs reminiscent of the kandake of Meroitic Kush." The tumuli of Durbi Takusheyi, which have been dated between the 13th century CE and the 16th century CE, may have connection to tumuli from Ballana and Makuria. Tumuli have also been found at Kissi, in Burkina Faso, and at Daima, in Nigeria.

=== 6500 BP – 5500 BP (4500 BCE – 3500 BCE) ===
By 6300 BP, pottery began to appear in Konduga. Occurring in the era of Mega Lake Chad, the pottery was designed in the custom of Saharan ceramics.

By at least the 4th millennium BCE, as indicated via the painted rock art of Tassili n'Ajjer, Proto-Fulani culture may have been present in the area of Tassili n'Ajjer. The Agades cross, a fertility amulet worn by Fulani women, may be associated with the hexagon-shaped carnelian piece of jewelry depicted in the rock art at Tin Felki. At Tin Tazarift, the depiction of a finger may allude to the hand of the mythic figure, Kikala, the first Fulani pastoralist. At Uan Derbuaen rockshelter of eastern Tassili, composition six may depict a white ox, under the spell of serpent-related animals, crossing through a U-shaped gate of vegetation, toward a powerful benevolent figure, in order to undo the spell on the ox. Composition six has been interpreted as portraying the Lotori ceremonial rite of Sub-Saharan West African Fulani herders. The annual Lotori ceremonial rite, held by Fulani herders, occurs at a selected location and period of time, and commemorates the ox and its origination in a source of water. The Lotori ceremonial rite promotes good health (e.g., prevent epizooties, prevent illness, prevent sterility) and reproductive success of cattle by having the cattle cross through a gate of vegetation, and thus, the continuity of the pastoral wealth of the nomadic pastoralist Fulani. The interpretation of composition six as portraying the Lotori ceremonial rite, along with other forms of evidence, have been used to support the conclusion that modern Sub-Saharan West African Fulani herders are descended from peoples of the Sahara.

Following the northward expansion from coastal West Africa refugia, West African hunter-gatherers arrived and began dwelling at the Korounkorokale rockshelter, in Pays Mande, Mali, where they engaged in hunting and fishing. By 4000 BCE, red ocher, used to paint pottery, jewelry, or pictographs, was developed by West African hunter-gatherers, which may have developed as a result of interaction with populations from lake areas to the northeast. With the increased use of grinded stones, and thus, cultural development of utilizing vegetation for food, this resulted in a decreased use of stone projectiles, and thus, decreased hunting cultural practices. By 700 CE, along with Niani having been established, Korounkorokale was embedded within the Kingdom of Kangaba. West African hunter-gatherers and their ancient cultural traditions may have persisted shortly thereafter, as West African hunter-gatherers became fully acculturated, and Malinke metallurgy and pottery traditions became predominant.

As a result of aridification of the Green Sahara, West Africans may have adapted by domesticating animals (e.g., Helmeted guineafowl) and plants (e.g., Pearl millet, African rice, Yams). West Africa may have been a major regional cradle in Africa for the domestication of crops and animals. Between 5889 BP and 3685 BP, West Africans domesticated pearl millet. Between 5500 BP and 1300 BP, West Africans domesticated the Helmeted guineafowl. Between 3200 BP and 2000 BP, West Africans domesticated African rice.

During the Holocene, the Green Sahara underwent the process of becoming a desert and became the Sahara; this occurrence may have contributed to the start of domesticating field crops. Akin to the Fertile Crescent of the Near East, the Niger River region of West Africa served as a cradle for field crop domestication and agriculture in Africa. Yams, rice, sorghum, pearl millet, and cowpea are field crops that originate in Africa. Domesticating of yams (e.g., D. praehensilis) likely began in the basin of the Niger River between eastern Ghana and western Nigeria (e.g., northern Benin). Domesticating of rice (e.g., Oryza glaberrima) likely began in the Inner Niger Delta region of Mali. Domesticating of pearl millet (e.g., Cenchrus americanus) likely began in the region of northern Mali and Mauritania. Domesticating of cowpeas likely began in the region of northern Ghana.

Before 5500 BP, Kordofanian pastoralists may have travelled to West Africa and West African hunters may have travelled to the Nuba Hills using the Yellow Nile River (Wadi Howar).

=== 5500 BP – 4500 BP (3500 BCE – 2500 BCE) ===
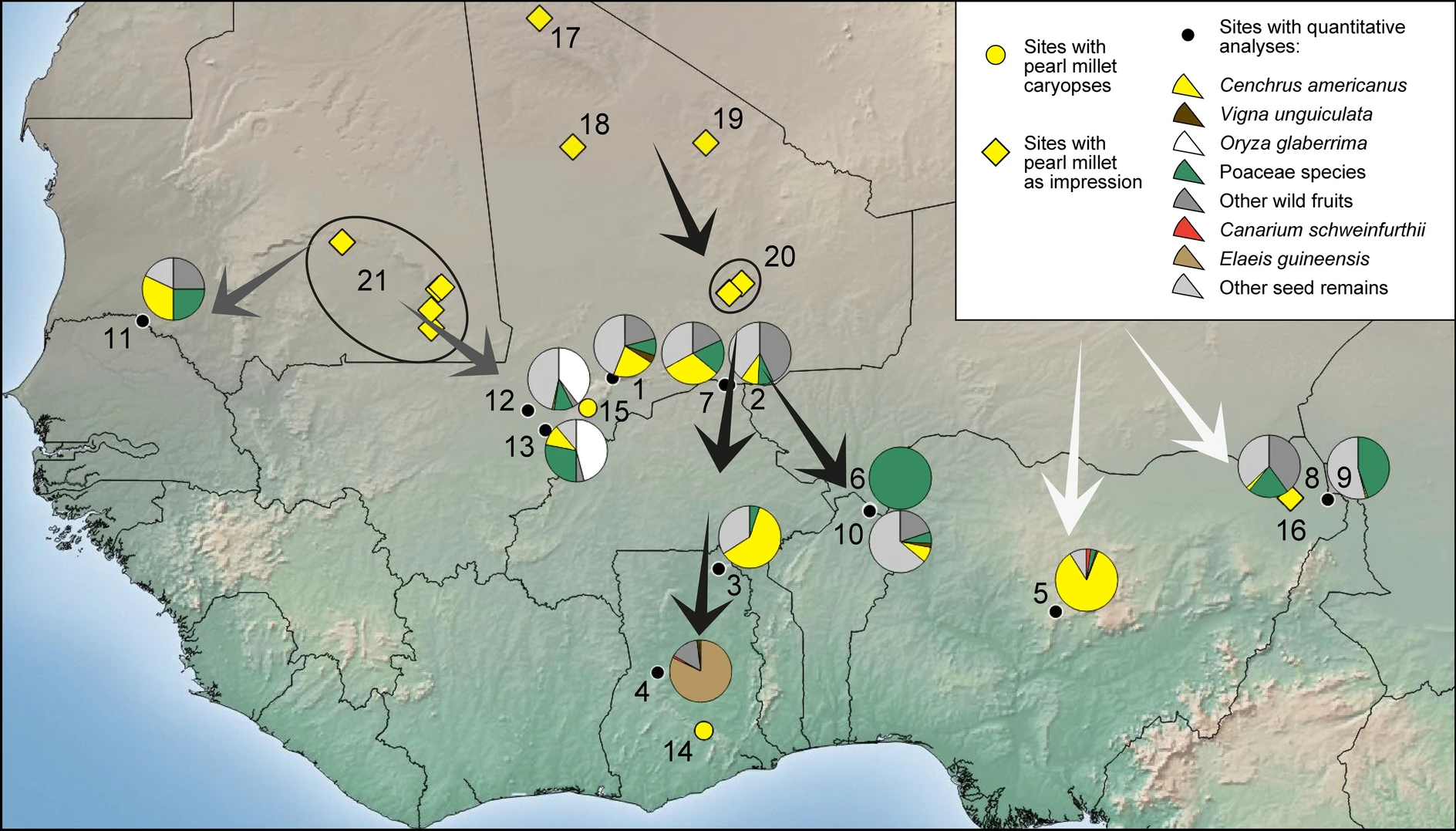
West African sites with archaeobotanical remains from third to first millennium BC. The arrows indicate pearl millet diffusion into sub-Saharan West Africa.

Herders from the Central Sahara migrated southward toward areas more fit for pastoralism, as the Green Sahara became increasingly dry after 3500 BCE. Seasonal waterways were the likely migratory route taken, by hunter-gatherers and cattle herders, to the Niger River and Chad Basin. Dwelling in the Sahelian region began to occur as long inhabited settlement and funerary sites of the northern region of Niger stopped being used. Migration of Central Saharan peoples into the Sahelian region of Sub-Saharan Africa is verified via Saharan influenced pottery that appear in the Sahelian region. Herders from the Sahara expanded, along with their cord-wrapped, roulette-detailed ceramic culture and the agricultural practice of pearl millet, throughout West Africa. Saharan roulette-detailed ceramics may be associated with herding cultures from southern Algeria or pre-herding cultures from Niger. After the first half of the 3rd millennium BCE, domesticated pearl millet emerged for the first time near the Saharan and Sahelian regional boundary, thereafter, it expanded into the Sahelian and West Sudanian savanna regional boundary of Sub-Saharan Africa. In adaptation to desertification, Saharan herders developed agriculture as an additional subsistence strategy. As an adaptation to the desertification of the Sahara amid the Green Sahara period, Saharan herders may have begun increasingly utilizing undomesticated flora near seasonally developed and local water sources (e.g., streams, ponds), and thus, contributed to the increased utilization and agricultural spread of pearl millet. After 2500 BCE, desertification of the Green Sahara may have resulted in Saharan herders traversing further south in West Africa. In 2000 BCE, amid the Later Stone Age, "Thiaroye Woman", also known as the "Venus of Thiaroye," may have been the earliest statuette created in Sub-Saharan West Africa; it may have particularly been a fertility statuette, created in the region of Senegambia; the Thiaroye figure, which was found among quartz, flint, and ceramic fragments and atop a tumulus, may be associated with the emergence of complexly organized pastoral societies in West Africa between 4000 BCE and 1000 BCE. Amid the 2nd millennium BCE, agriculture, likely along with cord-wrapped, roulette-detailed ceramics, spread throughout the Sahelian and West Sudanian savanna regions of West Africa. Cultural experience with the desertification of the Green Sahara may have contributed to adept adjustment to the drying of the Sahelian and West Sudanian savanna regions of Sub-Saharan Africa by agropastoralists. Agropastoralists, as early agriculturalists, who likely originated in the Central Sahara, began to migrate southward into these regions around 2200 BCE. Agropastoralists traversed through Tilemsi Valley and Ounjougou. Additional adaptations to desertification of the southern Sahara may have been the development of transhumance, which was engaged in seasonally among some agricultural herders, and the increased development of cord-wrapped roulette-detailed ceramics in Sub-Saharan Africa, which likely was first developed in the early period of the Holocene in the Central Sahara. While also hunting and gathering, agropastoralists engaged in agriculture on a seasonal basis. Earlier subsistence strategies involved a combined approach (e.g., agriculture, pastoralism, hunting, foraging). Later, migratory herding, which is solely reliant on pastoralism, developed, and divergence between modern migratory herders and settled agriculturalists occurred. After 1400 BCE and before 800 BCE the spread of agriculture may have been altered, and greening of the western Sahel occurred amid the 2nd millennium BCE. Spread of domesticated pearl millet may reached Lake Chad, via eastern spread from the Niger River or an alternative avenue from the Central Sahara. Increased dryness began to recur after 800 BCE in West Africa and Central Africa. Amid the 1st millennium BCE, agriculture spread, not only near Lake Chad, but near the Niger Delta, Senegal Valley, Jos Plateau, and the southern region of Cameroon.

Due to the complexity of pottery patterns and vastness of the area, where interactions between peoples occurred during the mid-Holocene, specifying which linguistic group (e.g., Niger-Congo, Nilo-Saharan, Afroasiatic) is the first settling population is challenging. In any case, pottery in Gajiganna shares cultural similarity, across nearby areas of the southern Sahara, most of all, with northwestern Niger and northwestern Sudan. Pottery from sites, dated to the second millennium BCE, close to the Mandara Mountains in Cameroon and Nigeria, also share affinity with the ceramics in Gajiganna.

Amid the middle of the Holocene, West African hunter-gatherers continued to dwell along the rivers and within the forests of coastal West Africa. West African hunter-gatherer stone industries had little presence to the north of the West Sudanian savanna and Sahel boundary, which may indicate that it served as a type of natural environmental barricade to their greatly mobile hunter-gatherer lifestyle. Increased use of ceramics among West African hunter-gatherers also occurred, as evidenced by ceramics dated to 5370 ± 100 BP in Bosumpra Cave, Ghana and ceramics dated to 4180 ± 160 BP in Mbi Crater, Cameroon. While likely still maintaining their hunter-gatherer culture, West African hunter-gatherers may have increasingly utilized local flora (e.g., palm oil, tubers).

At Khant, where people may have started dwelling in 5000 BP, the Neolithic human skeletal remnants of a tall, middle-aged man was found; the remnants possessed traits closer to other Sudanese of the Neolithic era than modern Senegambians.

Watermelons, which may originate in West Africa, may have spread into North Africa (e.g., seeds dated to 5000 BP at Uan Muhuggiag in southwestern Libya, Tutankhamun burial tomb in ancient Egypt) via trade between West Africans and North Africans or may have spread into North Africa naturally amid the Green Sahara (e.g., Pleistocene, Holocene).

West African ancestors may have diverged into distinct ancestral groups of modern West Africans and Bantu-speaking peoples in Cameroon, and, subsequently, around 5000 BP, the Bantu-speaking peoples migrated into other parts of Sub-Saharan Africa (e.g., Central African Republic, African Great Lakes, South Africa).

From Western Africa, the Bantu-speaking peoples, along with their ceramics, expanded into the rest of Sub-Saharan Africa. The Kalundu ceramic type may have expanded into Southeastern Africa. Additionally, the Eastern African Urewe ceramic type of Lake Victoria may have expanded, via African shores near the Indian Ocean, as the Kwale ceramic type, and expanded, via Zimbabwe, Zambia, and Malawi, as the Nkope ceramic type.

As a result of the migrations of Niger-Congo speakers (e.g., Bantu expansion), polyrhythmic culture (e.g., dance, music), which is generally associated with being a common trait among modern cultures of Africa, spread throughout Africa. Due to the Trans-Atlantic slave trade, music of the African diaspora, many of whom descend from Niger-Congo speakers, has had considerable influence upon modern Western forms of popular culture (e.g., dance, music).

In the Aïr Mountains region of Niger, copper was independently smelted between 3000 BCE and 2500 BCE. The quality of the smelting process being used was not well developed, thereby, indicating that it was not introduced into the Aïr Mountains from an external region, such as the Nile Valley. By 1500 BCE, the quality of the smelting process became more developed.

=== 4500 BP – 3500 BP (2500 BCE – 1500 BCE) ===
The savanna and forest of West Africa and savanna and forest of Central Africa are the areas that chimpanzees originate and dwell. As such, though rather speculative, by the 2nd millennium BCE, chimpanzees and/or their artistic depictions (e.g., "seated" and "crouched" chimpanzee statuettes developed between 2300 BCE and 1500 BCE) may have been exchanged in a long-distance trade network from West Africa or Central Africa, through East Africa (e.g., Elmenteitan) and Arabia, into the Near East (e.g., Elam). Another possibility (as via report of Hanno the Navigator) is that, via maritime trade from the Gulf of Guinea, to the eastern region of the Mediterranean, along the Incense Route, into the Near East. Additionally, it may have been traded from West Africa, via pathways through North Africa and Rome in the 2nd century CE, into the Near East.

From 4500 BP, Niger-Congo and Nilo-Saharan speakers in West Africa came into frequent contact with diverse Afroasiatic immigrants from Northeast Africa as well as speakers of a 'vanished language' to the south as aridity pressed populations into close proximity.

During the Copper Age and early Islamic era of ancient Israel, West Africans may have migrated into ancient Israel and introduced head louse from West Africa.

In 4000 BP, there may have been a population that traversed from Africa (e.g., West Africa or West-Central Africa), through the Strait of Gibraltar, into the Iberian Peninsula, where admixing between Africans and Iberians (e.g., of northern Portugal, of southern Spain) occurred.

After migrating from the Central Sahara, by 4000 BP, the Mande peoples of West Africa established their agropastoral civilization of Tichitt in the Western Sahara. The painted Pastoral rock art of Tassili n'Ajjer, Algeria and engraved Pastoral rock art of Niger bear resemblance (e.g., color markings of the cattle) with the engraved cattle portrayed in the Dhar Tichitt rock art in Akreijit. The engraved cattle pastoral rock art of Dhar Tichitt, which are displayed in enclosed areas that may have been used to pen cattle, is supportive evidence for cattle bearing ritualistic significance for the peoples of Dhar Tichitt. The considerable commonalities, absent in modern North African cultures, are present and able to be found between Round Head paintings and modern Sub-Saharan African cultures. Saharan ceramics are viewed as having clear likeness with the oldest ceramics found in Djenne-Djenno, which have been dated to 250 BCE. The egalitarian civilization of Djenne-Djenno was likely established by the Mande progenitors of the Bozo people, which spanned from the 3rd century BCE to the 13th century CE.

By 4000 BP, interaction between Saharan occupants and Sub-Saharan West African hunter-gatherers increased as Saharan occupants increasingly migrated southward into Sub-Saharan West Africa. As desertification was underway, West African hunter-gatherers of the Middle Niger were likely the first to encounter southward migrating Saharan occupants. Increased interaction may have resulted in the adoption of pottery and production of polished stone production, which, subsequently, may have led to these cultural practices being further diffused unto other West African hunter-gatherers. Additionally, pastoralism may have been adopted by some West African hunter-gatherers. As West African hunter-gatherers of the Middle Niger became increasingly acculturated and eventually admixed into more numerous, surrounding southward migrating Saharan occupants, some West African hunter-gatherers, further south, may have continued their hunting-gathering and/or basic vegetable cultivation cultures. Eventually, even these socially organized West African hunter-gatherers, were likely acculturated and admixed into the more numerous, surrounding West Africans from the Sahara.

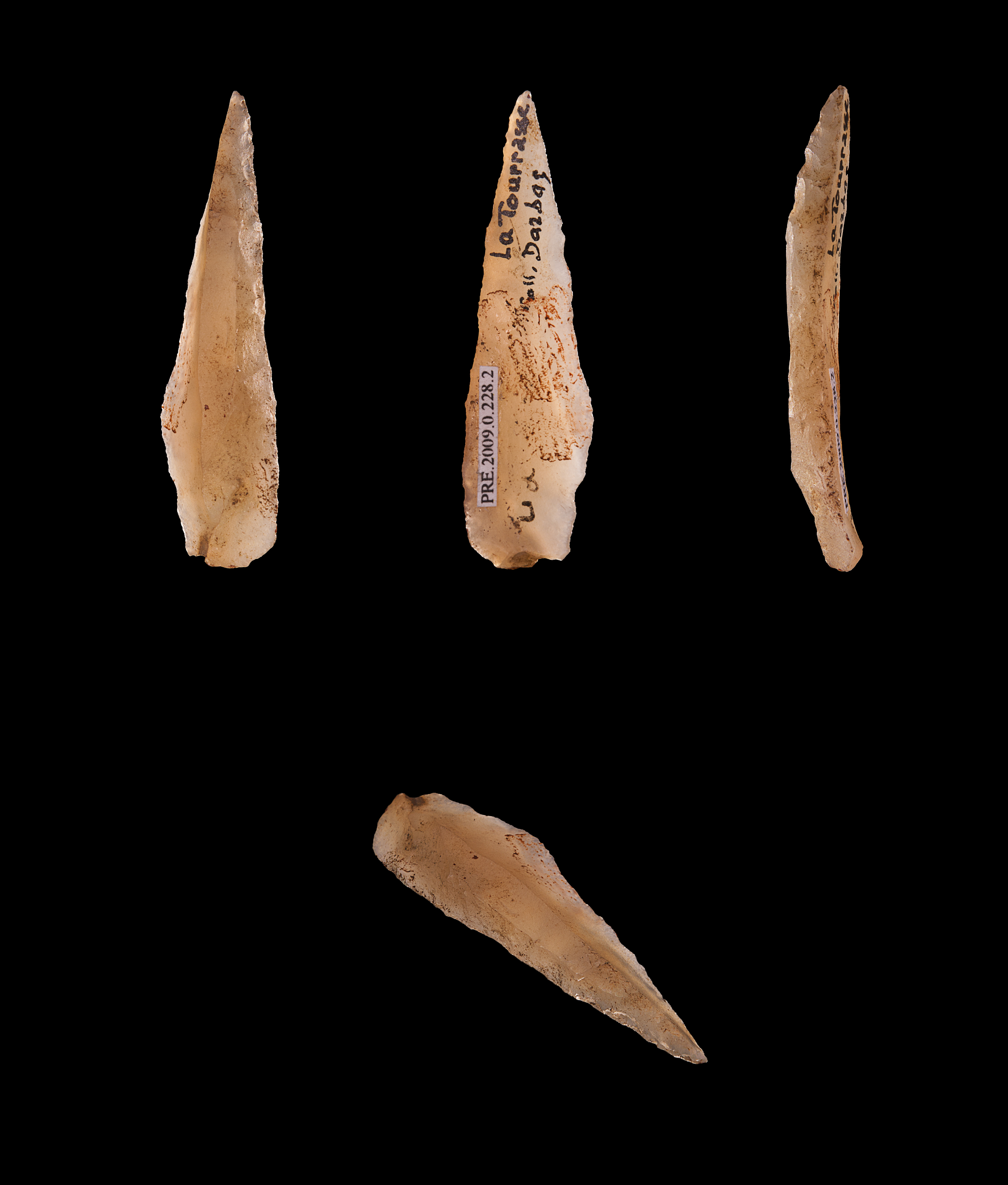
An example of a microlith projectile point, a very small stone tool. The shape of this one is similar to the ones that have been discovered at Kintampo sites.

Desertification of the Green Sahara resulted in the migration of Saharan pastoralists and agropastoralists south of the Sahelian region. Consequently, seasonal interaction likely occurred between Saharan pastoralists and agropastoralists and West African hunter-gatherers, who also practiced basic agriculture via vegetable cultivation. Sites in Ghana (e.g., Ntereso, Kintampo, Daboya) provide an example of group contact in 3500 BP, as evidenced by Punpun microlithic industries that appear in close proximity to Saharan projectile points, beads, stone innovations (e.g., stone arm rings, small stone axes), and livestock. Rather than Saharan pastoralists and agropastoralists replacing West African hunter-gatherers, there apparently was a merger of groups, as at Kintampo, there was evidence of adaptation to the subsistence conditions of the forest-savanna region of West Africa.

Domesticated crops (e.g., pearl millet, cowpea, large amounts of oil palm) and undomesticated flora were availed in rockshelters (e.g., B-sites, K6), near the Guinean forest-savanna mosaic, in the southern region of central Ghana. West African agriculturalists of Kintampo and West African hunter-gatherers of Punpun were migratory peoples, who settled at the sites seasonally for various reasons (e.g., oil palm production); this is evidenced by the varied way in which flora are situated at the rockshelters. West African hunter-gatherers may have migrated southward near the forest region or scattered into smaller groups amid arid seasons. Various activities (e.g., production of local resources) occurred in partially settled areas of the savanna and forest regions. After 4500 BP, desertification may have resulted in Saharan peoples migrating toward the south. The southern parts of the forest region, near Kintampo, may have been unfit for the subsistence techniques of farming domesticated crops (e.g., pearl millet) from the region of North Africa. As a result, subsistence techniques were adapted to the natural environment of the forest region, and local crops (e.g., oil palm, yams), may have been introduced into what was usually farmed. Successful adaptation to the local ecology seems to have occurred, from the southern part of the forest region to the coastal region of West Africa. West African agriculturalists likely formed mutual relations with the West African hunter-gatherers. As a result of these relations, West African hunter-gatherers, who also practiced basic agriculture via vegetable cultivation, likely provided West African agriculturalists with oil-rich and Vitamin A-rich nuts as part of their local food source. Additionally, West African agriculturalists may have acquired forest subsistence knowledge and strategies from West African hunter-gatherers.

As early as 4000 BP, the engraved petroglyphs of Burkina Faso began to be created. Rockshelters and barns were utilized by the creators of the engraved petroglyphs. The engraved rock art was composed of floral radiant circles, anthropomorphs, lizards and herbivores, and streaks/striations and a single spiral-headed cat. Anthropomorphs may have been the engraved image of a face composed plant and tree leaves as well as another possible engraved image of a face; one figure may have a hat and ten figures may have been wielding spears, and there may have been a few butterflies. Floral radiant circles (cupules within circles). At Dokiti, there are hundreds of radiant circles as well as images of what may be woodworms in wood and spindly monkeys. Mortars and grindstones as well as a linear arranged set of cupules within a cave with a rock in the center, which could have served as a ceremonial altar, were also found at an archaeological site. From a nearby village, potsherds and more fifty stone circles were created and utilized by Neolithic Africans, who were also likely the creators of the engraved rock art.

From 1700 BCE to 500 BCE, Terracotta net weights were used at Kolima South, Méma, Mali.

In the mid-4th millennium BP, four "Negroid" individuals occupied Kintampo, in Ghana.

Iron metallurgy may have been developed independently in West Africa. Archaeological sites containing iron smelting furnaces and slag have been excavated at sites in the Nsukka region of southeast Nigeria in what is now Igboland: dating to 2000 BC at the site of Lejja (Eze-Uzomaka 2009) and to 750 BC and at the site of Opi (Holl 2009). Iron metallurgy sites are known in the Nok culture from between the 9th century BCE and 550 BCE. More recently, Bandama and Babalola (2023) have indicated that iron metallurgical development occurred 2631 BCE – 2458 BCE at Lejja, in Nigeria, 2136 BCE – 1921 BCE at Oboui, in Central Africa Republic, 1895 BCE – 1370 BCE at Tchire Ouma 147, in Niger, and 1297 BCE – 1051 BCE at Dekpassanware, in Togo.

=== 3500 BP – 2500 BP (1500 BCE – 500 BCE) ===
In 1500 BCE, Mande speakers may have first domesticated African rice (Oryza glaberrima) and established the cultivation systems in the mid-region of the Niger River. Subsequently, West Atlantic speakers may have domesticated rice, utilizing irrigation systems with mangroves, near the Casamance and Sine-Saloum rivers.

In Sub-Saharan West Africa, there is rock art. At Igbara Oke, in proximity to Akure, Nigeria, there are engraved geometric (e.g., triangle) and fish rock art. In Bauchi State, Nigeria, there is rock art at the Shira and Geji sites; two rock art traditions at Shira are dark reddish monochrome-colored anthropomorphous and realistic (e.g., lactating cattle and their calves, humans) depictions and Geji has a painted depiction of a horse, which may show that Geji rock art does not date earlier than the 15th century BCE. Other rock art in the northern region of Nigeria includes sites in several villages of Marghi, in Borno State and Birnin Kudu, in Jigawa State. The anthropomorphous depictions (e.g., a red-, black-, and white-colored cow; short-horned and long-horned humpless cattle, which may predate the presence of humped cattle in the northern region of Nigeria and may be at least a thousand years old) at Birnin Kudu are distinct from the reddish colored depictions (e.g., 1 antelope and 2 humpless long-horned cows of outlined and striped rock art design; 1 horse, 1 unidentified portrayal, and 8 humpless long-horned cows of outlined rock art design; 2 men, 2 monkeys, 5 humpless long-horned cows, and 6 unidentified portrayals, and 11 antelopes of solid-colored painted rock art design) at Geji, and the depictions (e.g., humans, animals) at Marghi are associated with initiation and marital rites.

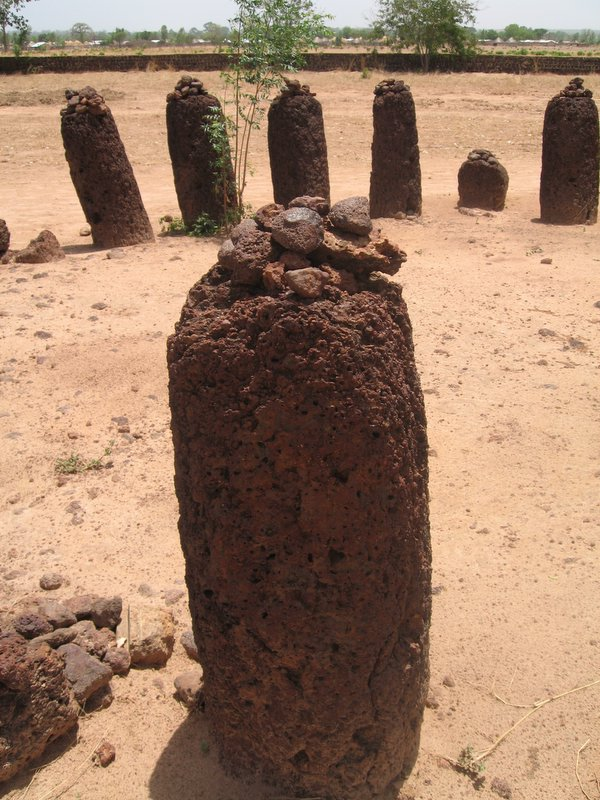
Senegambian megaliths

Between 1350 BCE and 1500/1600 CE, Senegambian megaliths (e.g., tumuli) were constructed for the purpose of ancestral reverence.

With exception to some parts of West Africa (e.g., Ntereso, Kintampo), prior to the late first millennium BCE, West African hunter-gatherers, who were the most widely spread cultural group of socially organized populations, were likely the only group to populate the forest and savanna regions of West Africa. The expansion of West African hunter-gatherers north, toward the Sahelian region of the Middle Niger, led to interaction with populations from further north. Prior to initial encounter with migrating populations from further north, West African hunter-gatherers may have already engaged in basic agricultural production of tubers as well as utilizing Elaeis guineensis and Canarium schweinfurthii. After interaction began, some West African hunter-gatherers may have acquired knowledge of pottery and polished stone production, which then spread further southward onto other West African hunter-gatherers, while others may have acquired knowledge of pastoralism. Continued interaction may have resulted in further acculturation (e.g., loss of West African hunter-gatherer languages). Isolated groups of West African hunter-gatherers may have continually dwelled throughout the region of the Pays Mande mountains after the development of metallurgy. West African hunter-gatherers may have even adopted, culturally adapted metallurgical practices, while still maintaining their ancient stone industrial traditions. Cultural continuity, via stone industries of isolated West African hunter-gatherers from the forest-savanna region, has been found throughout West Africa as late as the end of first millennium CE. In Sopie FkBvl, Liberia, quartz microliths have been dated to 2360 ± 125 BP. Kamabai Shelter, in Sierra Leone, had quartz microliths dated to 1190 ± 95 BP. In Mali, quartz microliths were dated to 1430 ± 80 BP in Nyamanko and dated to 1020 ± 105 BP in Korounkorokale. Kariya Wuro, in Nigeria, had quartz microliths dated to 950 ± 30 BP. After having persisted as late as the end of first millennium CE, or 1000 BP, many of the remaining West African hunter-gatherers were likely ultimately acculturated and admixed into the larger groups of West African agriculturalists, akin to the migratory Bantu-speaking agriculturalists and their encounters with Central African hunter-gatherers.

According to Anne Mayor, migrations occurred from the Sahel and Sahara into the West African Savanna, from the first millennium BCE to the first millennium CE, likely due to aridification, resulting in significant contributions being made to the overall protohistoric peopling of the Niger Bend. One migration originated from the northwest with the complex societies (e.g., Dhar Tichitt) of Mauritania and is associated with corded roulette ceramics. The other migration from the northeast consisted of iron metallurgists from Niger who spread concave matting techniques for ceramics into West Africa that originated along the Sudano-Tchadian border. Peoples of the Niger Bend practiced "fishing, hunting, herding, agriculture, iron metallurgy, interregional (or even long-distance) commerce, and sometimes – hierarchical social organization."

A comparative archeological analysis of artifacts at the Cairo Museum and the Theodore Monod Museum of African art in Dakar, Senegal reveals a deep material culture kinship between contemporary West Africans and the Pharaonic civilization that has traversed space and time.

Contrary to the popular academic myth of North Africans (e.g., Garamantes) engaging in the chariot-driven capture, enslavement, and trade of Sub-Saharan West Africans during classical antiquity, there were equitable transactions of materials (e.g., gold) made between Sub-Saharan West Africans and North Africans (e.g., Carthaginians).

=== 2500 BP – 1500 BP (500 BCE – 500 CE) ===
In 400 BCE or 300 BCE, as the Green Sahara underwent desertification, agropastoralists migrated in different directions from the eastern region of Mauritania. Some may have migrated southward and became the agropastoral Bafour peoples, and some may have migrated northward and became the agricultural Haratine peoples.

In Itaakpa rock shelter, Nigeria, human remains (e.g., mandible, maxilla), which are similar to human remains from Shum Laka, Cameroon, and, along with ceramics and African oil palm (Elaeis guineensis), are dated to 2210 ± 80 BP.

Between 2000 BP and 1500 BP, Nilo-Saharan speakers may have migrated across the Sahel, from East Africa into West Africa, and admixed with Niger-Congo-speaking Berom people. In 710 CE, West African-related populations (e.g., Niger-Congo-speaking Berom people, Bantu-speakers) and East African-related populations (Nilo-Saharan-speaking Ethiopians, Nilo-Saharan-speaking Chadians) admixed with one another in northern Nigeria and northern Cameroon.

In 1990 BP, a "Negroid" agriculturalist (indicated via dental evidence from the skeletal remains) occupied Rop rock shelter, in the northern region of Nigeria.

At the Akumbu mound complex, in Mema, Mali, its findings date between 400 CE and 1400 CE; at the cultural deposit of AK3, which contained three human remains, the dates range between 400 CE and 600 CE. While two out of three human remains were in a fully decomposed state, one of the human remains were able to be determined to be a young adult (17-25 years old) female, who was buried with two copper bracelets – one on each wrist, 13 cowrie shells, 11 stone beads, and a fully intact pot.
