= Kirikongo =

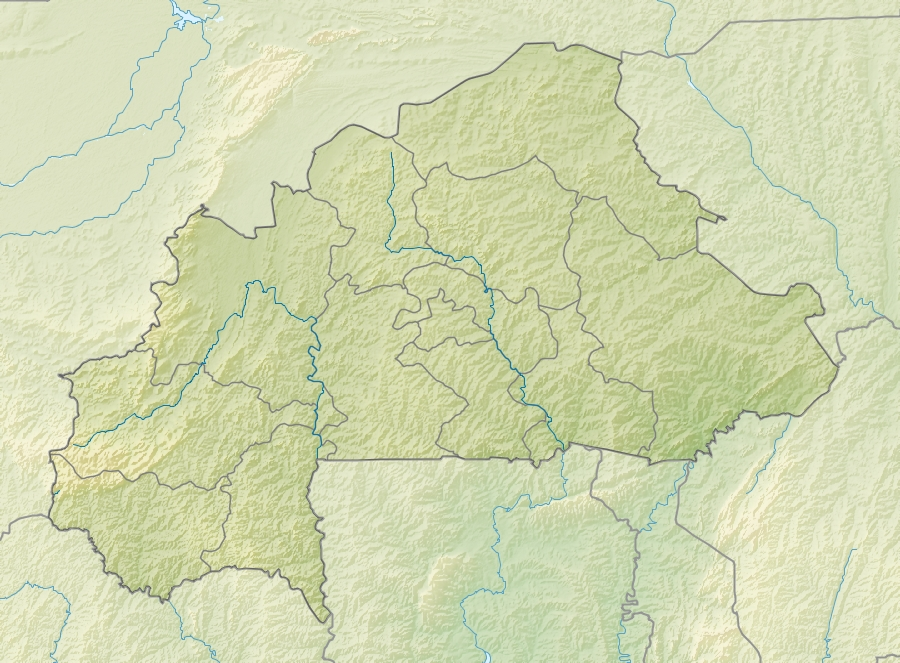
- Kirikongo Archaeological Site
- 12°33′14″N 3°21′47″W
- Location: Burkina Faso

Kirikongo is an archaeological site located in the Mouhoun Bend region of Burkina Faso. The importance of Kirikongo and investigations of other sites in the Mouhoun River drainage system is that the system remains relatively unexplored and was inhabited by the ancestors of the Bwa. Additionally, the area represents a zone of punctuated assimilation and adoption of animal husbandry and agriculture during the occupations at Kirikongo. The site consists of several mounds that each represented a household.

== Archaeology of the Mouhoun Bend ==
The Mouhoun Bend is important archaeologically for its presence along the transition between Holocene forest and the margins of the savanna throughout time. From an agricultural perspective, this region is located along an area with intensive use of tubers in the forests to the south and west and cereals in the savanna margins to the north and east. Major occupations in the Mouhoun Bend range from 700 BC to AD 1600. From a cultural perspective, Later Stone Age and Early Iron Age occupations in the Mouhoun Bend are associated with the Kintampo Complex to the south As a product of historical seclusion from state-level societies that developed in western Africa during the Late Iron Age and a lack of contemporary interest by archaeologists, archaeological sites in the Mouhoun Bend have remained greatly underinvestigated. Archaeological investigations that have taken place, though, have focused almost entirely on creating chronological timelines and basic economic transitions.

== Archaeological deposits at Kirikongo and interpretations ==
The village site of Kirikongo was occupied during the Iron Age, from around AD 100 to 1700. The site consists of thirteen mounds interspersed over a thirty-seven hectare area. The majority of the mounds are centered in a village center, with the remainder clustered in a greater spread. Characteristic of other Iron Age sites, archaeological deposits at Kirikongo are indicative of iron smelting and production of ground stone for agricultural processing.

Kirikongo may represent one of many dispersed household clusters throughout the Upper Volta river system. The earliest occupations at Kirikongo have been dated to around AD 100 and consist of a single household. By AD 500, there were several households present at the site—indicative of population increase and cultural continuity. These households were constructed out of earthen materials with clay floors. The households were generally equal in status in AD 500, but over the years, the society stratified based on family lineage demonstrated by differences in settlement organization. During this period, housing structures changed from a construction from earthen materials to the use of brick architecture. Around AD 1100 a more complex structure, with status based on a mix of lineage, heads of households, and skilled professionals emerged. The presence of cattle at Kirikongo provides data that supports cultural developments at Jenne-Jeno as part of a migration of ancestral Bwa peoples.

Architectural features of note at Kirikongo include ritualized architecture indicative of an ancestor house where goods were collected and stored, and ritual animal sacrifice occurred—evidenced by faunal remains. Another unique aspect of Kirikongo is evidence for a shift in the production of ceramics. Around AD 1100, ceramic production seems to have shifted from an unspecialized to a specialized sequence based on a loss of high localized variability. In addition to ceramic and architectural data, bioarchaeological analysis has provided strong indications in transitions towards social inequality by AD 1100. The most significant evidence is the presence of a system of restricted access and practice of burial actions. Subsistence remains demonstrate an economy that emphasized localized opportunistic hunting, presence of certain domesticates, and cultivation of plants.

The population of Kirikongo dropped precipitously in the 14th century, likely due to the spread of the Bubonic plague.

== Significance of Kirikongo ==
In comparison to other archaeologically known settlements in western Africa, Kirikongo has scant evidence for long-distance trade. This evidence contrasts with that from northern Burkina Faso and the known trade interactions with Saharan and coastal populations. Cattle adoption at Kirikongo is argued to have occurred relatively early and perhaps demonstrates a trend of adoption across sub-Saharan western Africa around the same time. Additionally, ceramic assemblages at Kirikongo are indicative of the potential for regional interaction with the Kintampo Complex and cultural development out of pre-existing populations. In fact, Kirikongo may represent merely one of many homestead farming settlements located throughout the Mouhoun Bend and surrounding region during the late Iron Age. Changes in homestead structure from reciprocal to group formalized in intergroup dynamics characterize the region's occupations post-AD 500.

== See also ==
- Iron Age
- History of Burkina Faso
- Bura culture
