= Birimi =

Archaeological site in Ghana

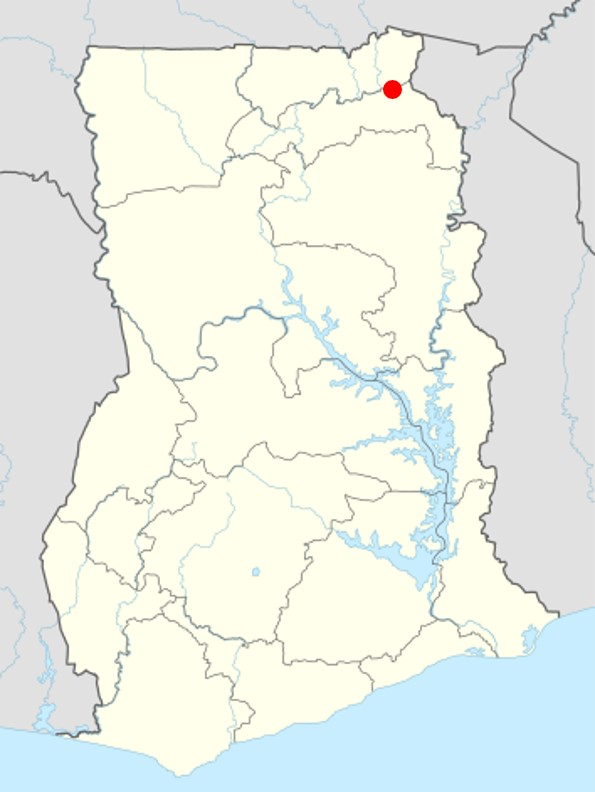
- Location of Birimi

- Location within Ghana
- 8.60°N 1.11°W
- Location: Gambaga and Nalerigu

Birimi is an archaeological site associated with the Kintampo Complex, located in northern Ghana between the towns of Gambaga and Nalerigu, which was occupied during the Middle Stone Age, Later Stone Age, and Iron Age.

== Site ==
Birimi is an archaeological site that was discovered in the northern regions of Ghana. The site lies on the Gambaga escarpment, about 3.5 kilometers to the northwest of the town of Nalerigu. Excavations of the site begun in the year 1987, led by Francois Kense. These were also the first excavations in the wider area around this site. The Birimi site is situated primarily within a system of seasonal stream channels, which are covered with lithic artifacts and show signs of extractive activities. During research and excavation campaigns at Birimi, samples were taken to learn about the site and its broader region; these samples included pottery, burned daub, sediment, charcoal and palaeobotanical remains for stylistic, archaeometry and/or dating purposes.

== Middle Stone Age ==
The earliest occupation phase of Birimi has been dated to the Middle Stone Age. The material finds consist of a variety of different stone artifact forms including Levallois flakes and cores, disk cores, blades, bifaces, notches, denticulates and retouched flakes and blades. In situ, artifacts can be found 1 meter below the surface level of the ground. However, these are not easily linked to other contemporaneous cultures of the Middle Stone Age due to Middle Stone Age sites of West Africa not being well understood.

== Later Stone Age ==
The Later Stone Age occupation phase of Birimi, which is associated with the Kintampo Complex and the origin of agriculture in sub-Saharan West Africa, has been dated between 3500 and 3000 BP. This former habitation makes for a very ceramic-rich layer on the site. This is the occupation layer of the site that has been investigated the most based on the clear presence of the Kintampo complex. Charred plant remains from Birimi show evidence of the cultivation of pearl millet, which may have allowed the Kintampo people to be sedentary and establish a village; there are indications for wattle and daub structures, as well as evidence of multiple building techniques present, resulting in multiple structures of varying sizes, which has been found at other Kintampo sites.

== Iron Age ==
The Iron Age occupation phase roughly (600 to 200's BCE) of Birimi occurred in its western region. Kintampo settlement sites are often found near Iron Age sites. However, no Iron Age habitations have been found near the smelters. The ironworking activities can be found in the forms of multiple slag mounds and furnaces throughout the western region of Birimi.
