= Kintampo Complex =

Early West African complex

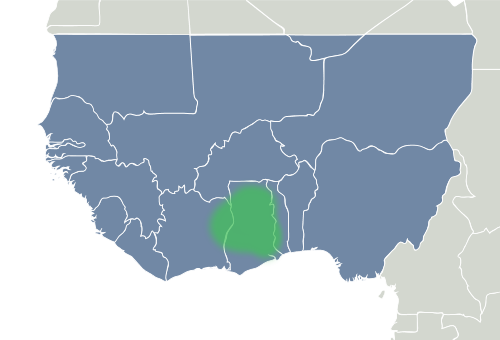
- Kintampo sites within West Africa

- Location within Ghana
- 8.30°N 1.431°W
- Type: Urban settlement
- Location: Bono East region of Ghana, eastern Ivory Coast, and Togo

The Kintampo complex, also known as the Kintampo culture, Kintampo Neolithic, and Kintampo Tradition, was established by Saharan agropastoralists, who may have been Niger-Congo or Nilo-Saharan speakers and were distinct from the earlier residing Punpun foragers, between 2500 BCE and 1400 BCE. The Kintampo complex was a part of a transitory period in the prehistory of West Africa, from pastoralism to sedentism in West Africa, specifically in the Bono East region of Ghana, eastern Ivory Coast, and Togo. The Kintampo complex also featured art, personal adornment items, polished stone beads, bracelets, and figurines; additionally, stone tools (e.g., hand axes) and structures (e.g., building foundations) were found, which suggests that the Kintampo people had both a complex society and were skilled with Later Stone Age technologies.

== Origin ==
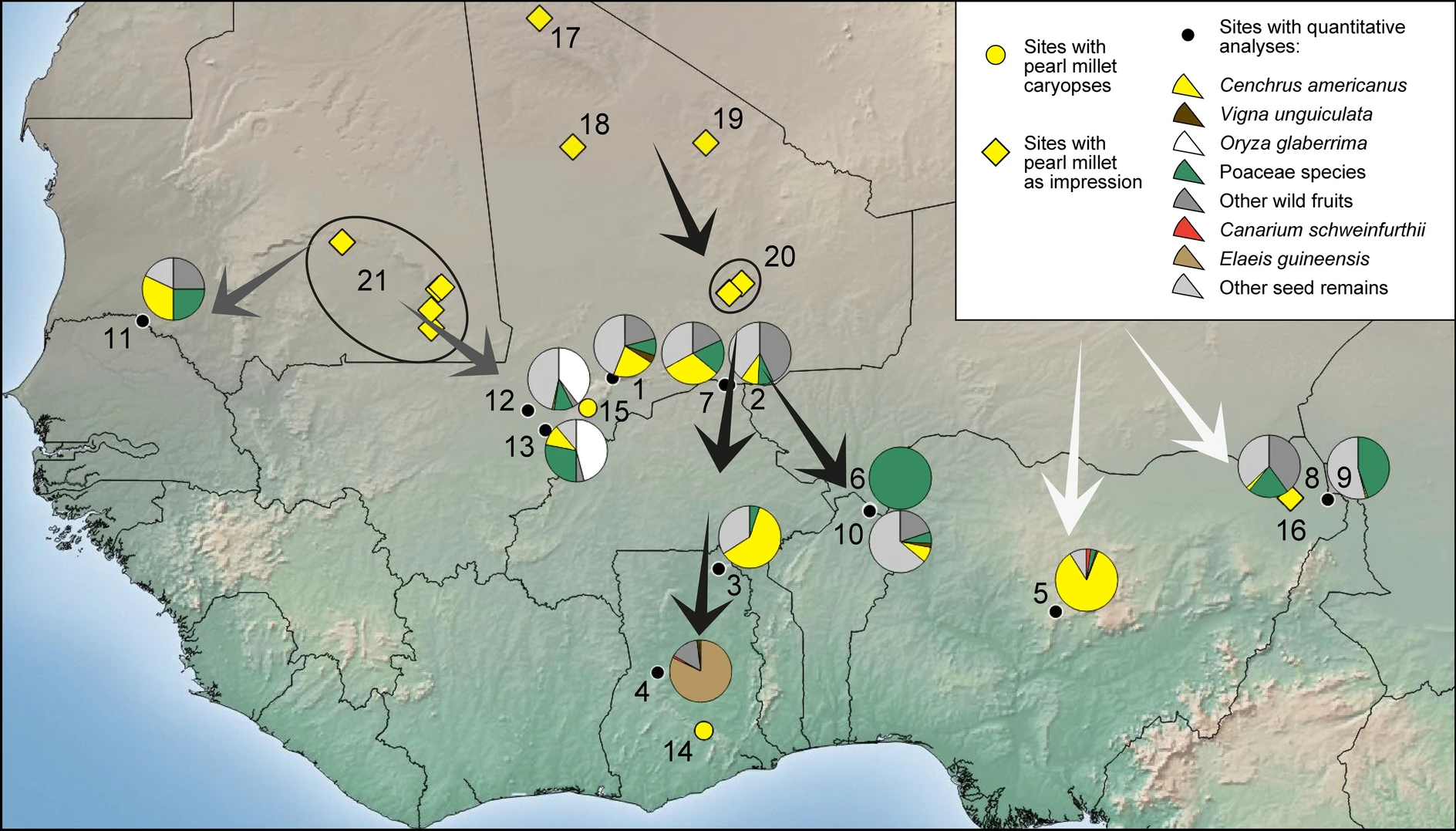
West African sites with archaeobotanical remains from third to first millennium cal bc. The arrows indicate directions of pearl millet diffusion into sub-Saharan West Africa, including 4. Kintampo B-Sites and 14. Bosumpra Cave.

Watson (2005) states:

Based on excavation and archaeological data from the Sahara, Sahel, and southern West Africa, this article proposes a migration model as explanation for the distinctive discontinuity signalled by the appearance of the Kintampo Tradition between 3,600 bp-3,200 bp and the origin of food production in the forest/forested zone, similar to the event envisaged by DAVIES (1966, 1980). Distinctions between the pottery of the Kintampo and indigenous Punpun foragers are a critical element of this argument, as fundamental stylistic and, especially, technological differences observed correspond to social and/or ethnic boundaries documented in ethnoarchaeological studies. Combined with evident similarities in Kintampo material culture and economy with contemporaneous groups in the Sahel, and the lack of any convincing evidence for an indigenous syncretic development within the savanna-forest/forest zone, this strongly suggests that the Kintampo was an intrusive population. The Punpun and Kintampo Traditions were two distinct socio-economic groups whose co-occupation of central Ghana signals the meeting of two different' worlds', represented by the 'Saharan derived' agro-pastoralists from the Sahel, who brought with them the values/technologies associated with food production (e.g. social differentiation), which eventually dominated a landscape that had been previously occupied solely by 'southern' hunter-gatherers.

Champion et al. (2022) state:

The cultivation of pearl millet diffused from the desiccating West and Central Sahara into the West African savanna zone after 2500 cal bc, in the context of southwards population movements (Ozainne et al. 2014; Neumann 2018; Fuller et al. 2021). Previously published evidence proposed three main branches of pearl millet diffusion, based on archaeobotanical data (Neumann 2018; Champion 2020; Fuller et al. 2021), but also on recent genetic studies (Oumar et al. 2008; Burgarella et al. 2018) and archaeological data (Ozainne et al. 2009, 2014). The two best documented are a western branch from Tichitt/Mauritania, after 2000 cal bc (Fuller et al. 2007; MacDonald et al. 2009), and a central branch from Tilemsi/Mali, after 2500 cal bc (Manning et al. 2011). Pearl millet cultivation spread quickly throughout the Niger River Basin, from the Tilemsi Valley in Mali to northern Burkina Faso (Tin-Akof, Oursi West) and to the rainforest of Ghana [4. Kintampo B-Sites and 14. Bosumpra Cave] between 2500 and 1000 cal bc (Fig. 8).

== Language ==
Proto-Kintampo Saharan agropastoralists, who were distinct from Punpun foragers, may have been Niger-Congo or Nilo-Saharan speakers.

== Archaeology ==
=== Settlements ===
The people of Kintampo lived in open-air villages composed of rectangular structures made from wattle and daub construction techniques. Some houses used mud and clay, and many were found to have been supported by wooden poles, and some had stone foundations made of granite and laterite. Rock shelters were also used as dwellings, especially to the south, near the Atlantic coast. Many settlements were situated along the White Volta River, which flowed north-to-south through Ghana and into the Atlantic Ocean. Other settlements, such as the rock shelters of southwestern Ghana and southeastern Ivory Coast, were also found near the Atlantic coast. They also kept domesticated dogs, goats and cattle.

=== Artifacts ===
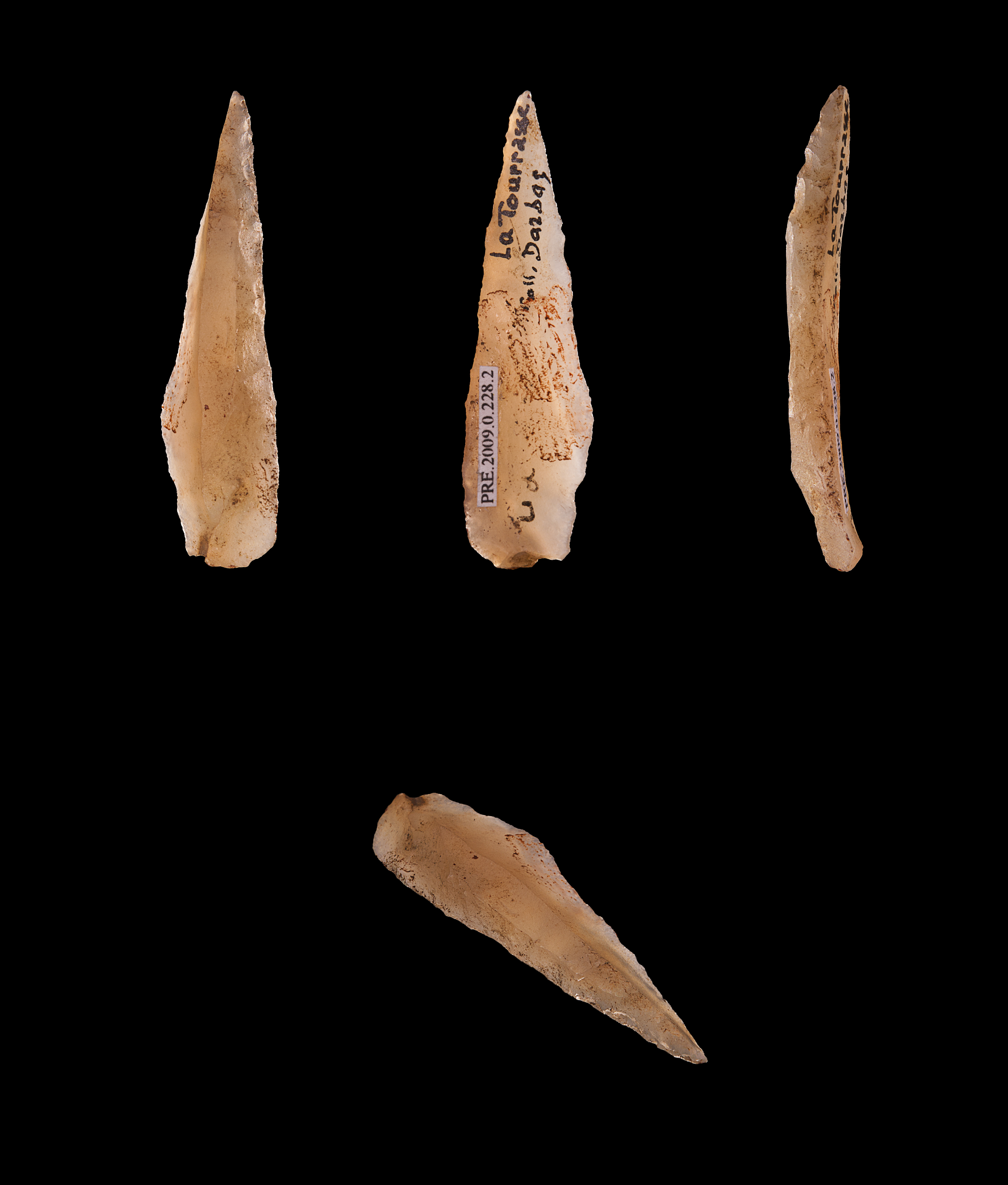
An example of a microlith projectile point, a very small stone tool. The shape of this one is similar to the ones that have been discovered at Kintampo sites.

Numerous types of tools have been excavated at Kintampo, including polished axes crafted from calc-chlorite schist, many types and sizes of grinding stones, small quartz microlith projectile points of various shapes and styles, and stone celts. A few harpoons have been found, but these are rare.

The knapping technique they used is well understood by lithics experts. The stone core was placed on a hard level surface such as a large rock, log, or trunk, then struck from above, forcing flakes to separate from the material from underneath. This use of a makeshift anvil is typical of bipolar percussion.

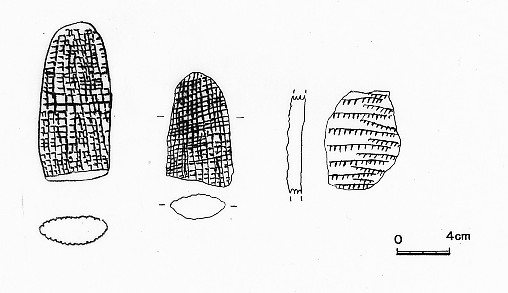
"Stone rasp" and pottery fragments of the Kintampo culture

There is some confusion about the purpose of a number of small stone and ceramic objects that are cigar-shaped and rasp-like. They are thought to be tools for creating pottery, of which bowls and jars seem to be the most common. The jars ranged from 12 to 44 cm in diameter. The bowls were slightly smaller on average, ranging from 10 to 30 cm. Many times these pots were decorated with a comb-like or rake pattern. These were likely used not only for the storage of food and water, but also for boiling and crafting sauces. The pottery appears to have been fired in a pit, typical of early ceramic practices. In fact, the pottery of Kintampo has been widely studied; in fact, it is possibly the most studied later Stone Age ceramics in West Africa. Pieces of a substance known as daga have been found along with the stone artifacts. Daga is chunks of ceramics that have been visibly marked by sticks or other pole-like implements. Somewhat common at Kintampo sites, these are understood to represent occupation in dwellings.

The Kintampo culture is known for possibly the first occurrences of figurative art and objects of personal decoration in West Africa. Stone arm bands that would have been worn as decoration have been found at several Kintampo sites. At the sites of Boyase hill and Ntersero, clay figurines of animals like dogs, lizards and cows were found, though it is not well understood what their meaning might be. This is all very important to those who study the humanities, as the emergence of art and the depiction of life through art is of great interest to both art historians and archaeologists alike.

=== Food ===
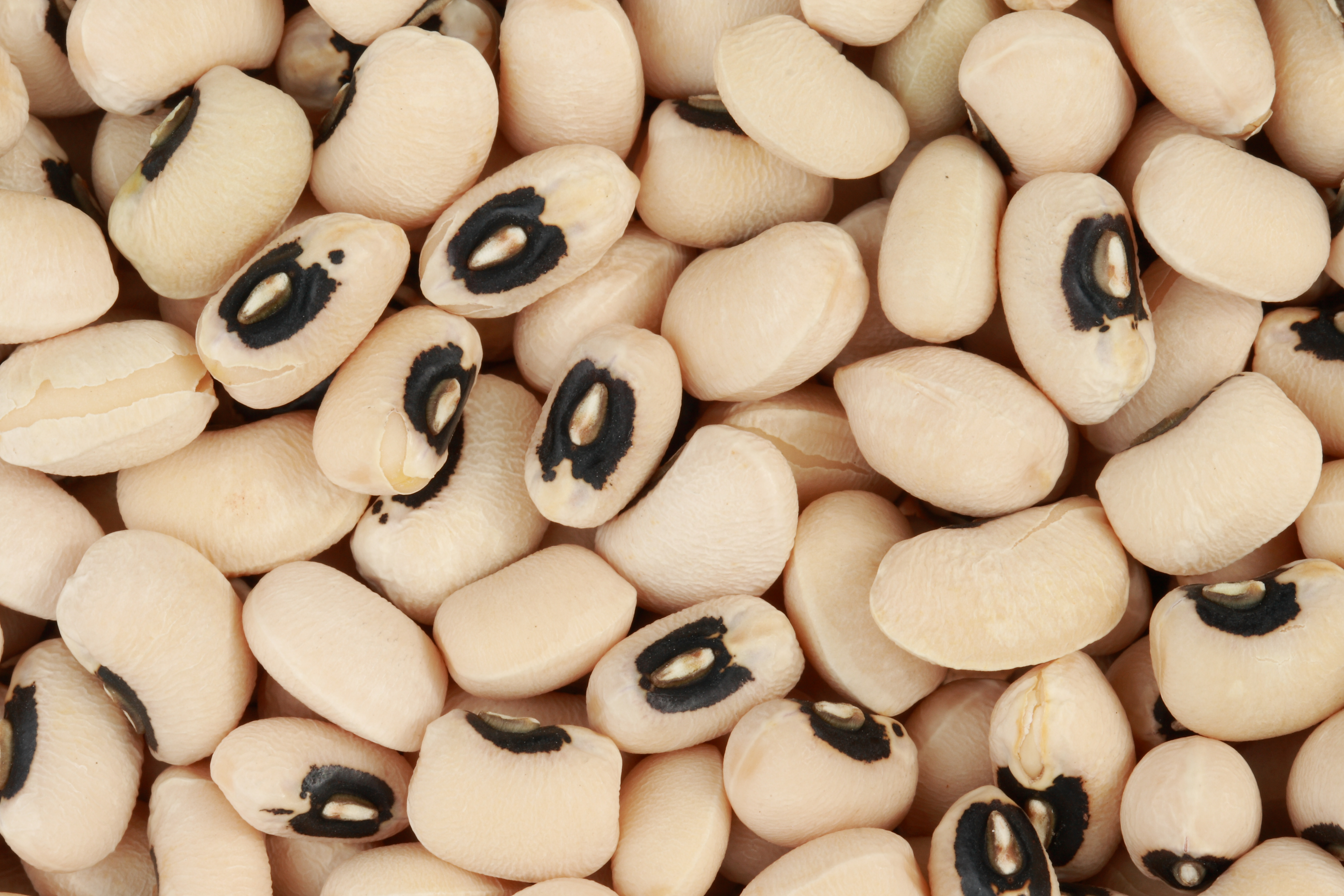
The cowpea, also known as the black-eyed pea.

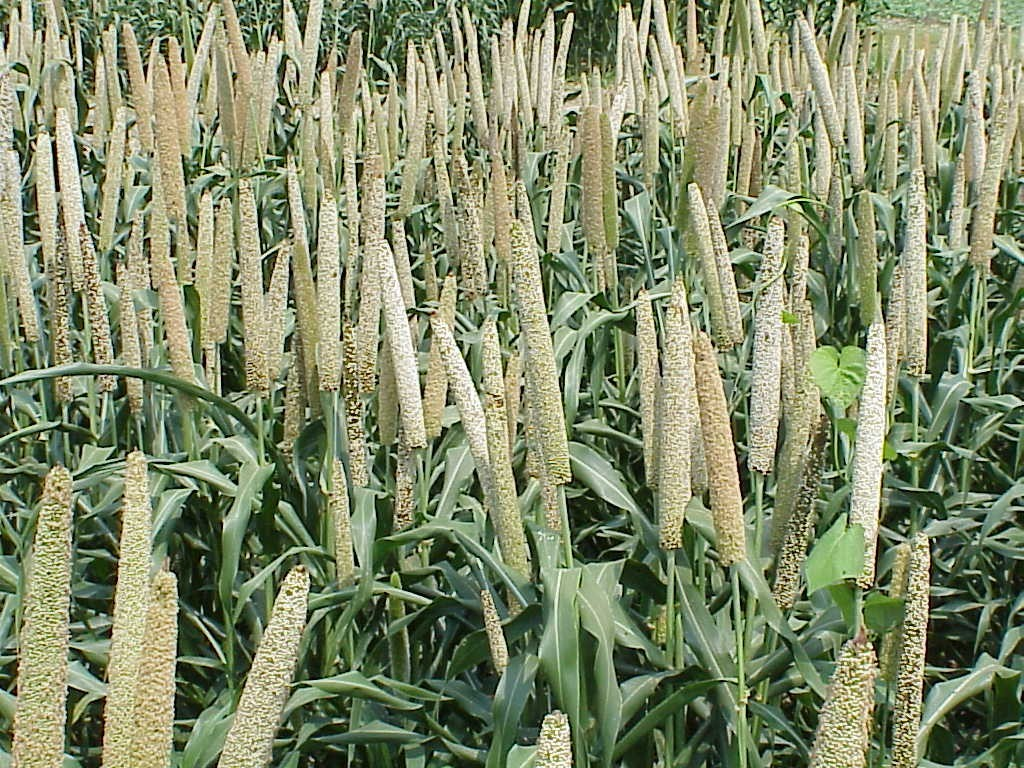
Pearl millet, the most common variety of millet.

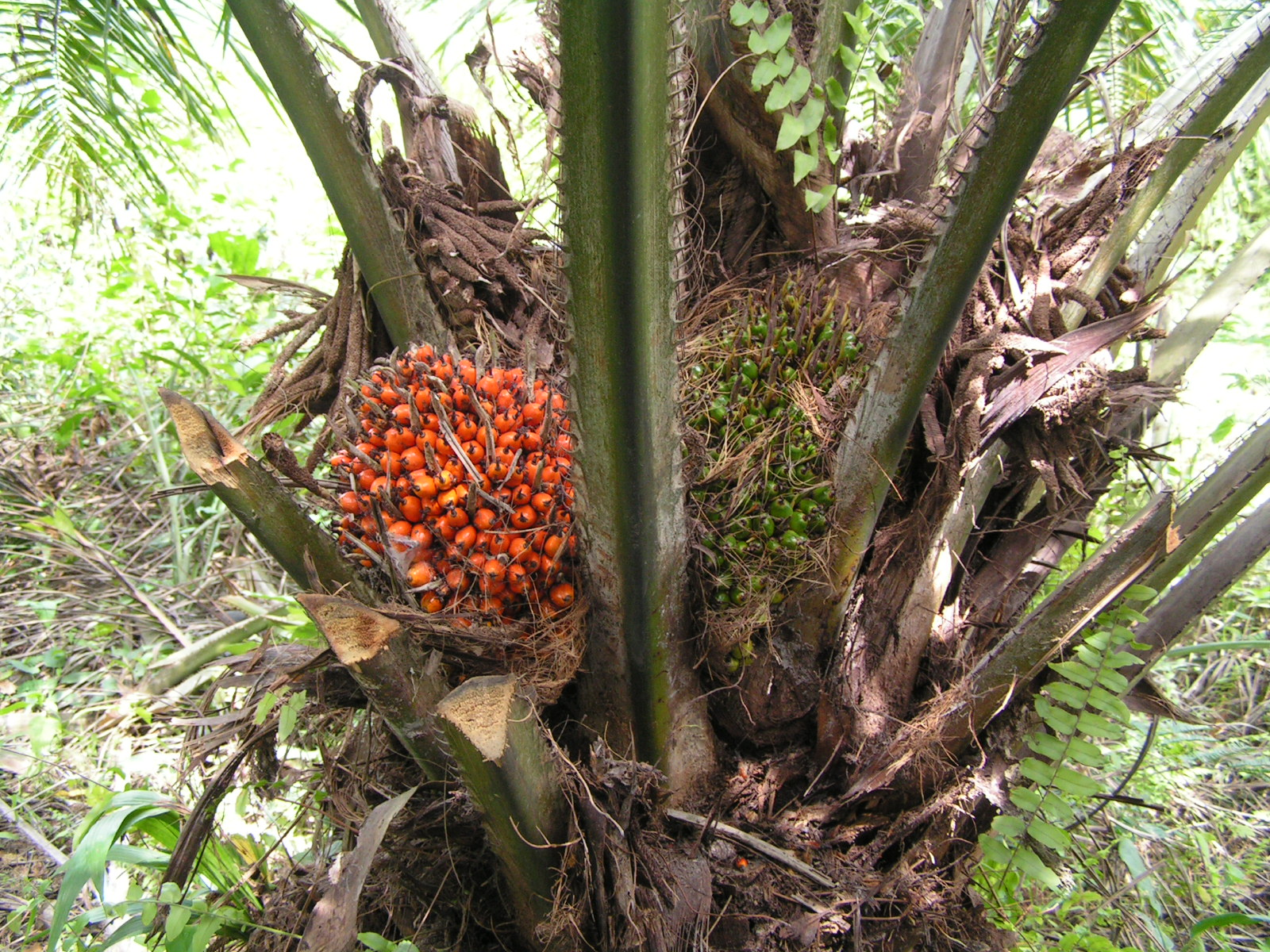
The fruit of the African oil palm

The Kintampo site is most often studied by archaeologists who are interested in seeing how people made the change between foraging and horticulture and agriculture as a way of producing food. Kintampo is seen as an example of neither foraging nor farming, but somewhere in between. As practitioners of sedentism, derived from the word sedentary, the people of Kintampo spent more time in their villages and less time wandering around, hunting, and gathering food. They took advantage of plants that were native to the area, and although technically they were not farming, they did influence the evolution of plants, effectively being some of the first to domesticate plants in Africa.

Pearl millet is a crop that is well-suited to hot climates, and is thought to have been first domesticated in the area. It is speculated that the people of Kintampo may have deliberately adapted it to mature faster, to allow for quicker harvest. Its charred remains have been excavated at Kintampo and were valuable to people living in West Africa because they could be stored after harvest to be used at a later date. There is evidence of trade of foods with other people throughout the region; one item of evidence is that the millet has been found with shell beads that would have been imported from the ocean.

Another important staple to the people who settled at Kintampo was the oil palm. The oil palm was used at Kintampo starting at least 4000 years ago. A very useful plant in many ways, it serves as a source of drink, food, and construction material. It was allowed to flourish in the region due to its preference for a constant warm climate and high rainfall. As a food, the oil can be extracted from the mesocarp, which covers the plant, and the kernel which is also edible by itself. It is an excellent source of vitamin A, which would have helped to support a growing population. It is speculated that ceramic techniques were improved so that the nut of the oil palm could be further cooked.

The cowpea, incense tree, hackberry, yams, and sorghum are also known to have been grown. Grasses were most likely not harvested as often, as the climate makes it difficult for grasses to grow. Kintampo people also kept livestock; goat, sheep, and cattle remains have been found. Other wild animals such as monitor lizards, snails, guineafowl, vervet monkey, baboon, turtles and tortoises royal and duiker antelopes, giant pouched and cane rats were hunted as game.

=== Sites ===
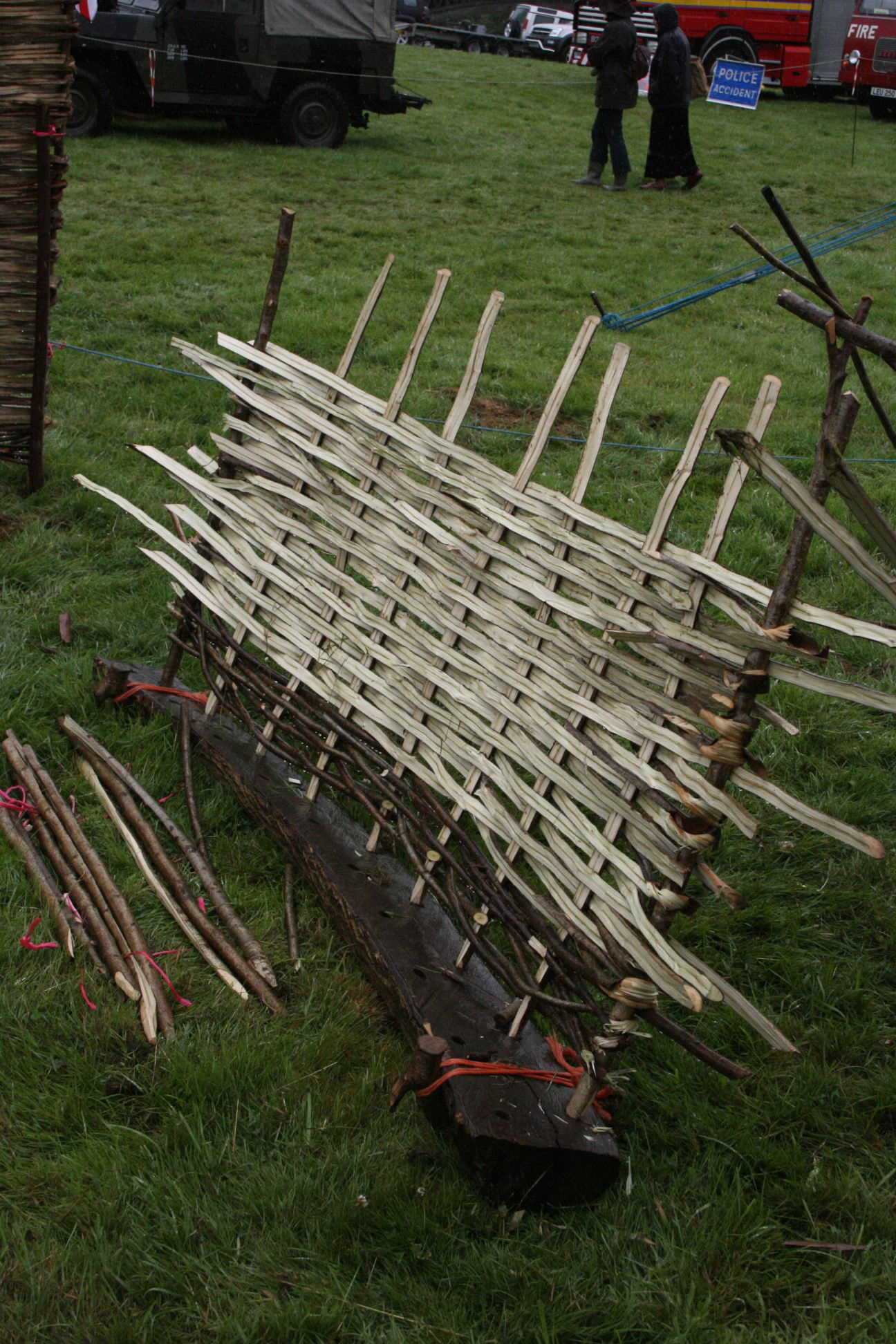
A panel of wattle being created. This ancient construction material is made by weaving straw or reeds into a rigid sheet( the wattle). The next step is to cover the sheet in daub, a compound that was typically made from clays and animal dung to fortify the wattle. The result is a sturdy structure that very much resembles a wall. The peoples of Kintampo used this as their primary construction technique.

Archaeologists have studied at least three dozen sites relating to the Kintampo complex in three different types of environments within and near Ghana.

==== Northern savanna ====
- Birimi: This site was founded in 1987 by Francois Kense. There is evidence of pearl millet having been cultivated.
- Chukoto
- Daboya: At this site, pieces of charred pearl millet were found. Also found were structural remains from housing, burnished pottery, beads made from various materials, including quartz and shell.
- Lake Kpriri
- Mole Game Reserve
- Ntereso: Found in 1952 by Oliver Davies, outlines of dwellings have been excavated since the early 1960s, and pieces of construction material such as fired clay and wooden support poles have been found. Artifacts typical of a hunting-fishing community such as harpoons and fish hooks were discovered here. Clay figurines shaped like lizards and bovids were also discovered. There is also evidence of animal husbandry being practiced.
- Tamale: Stone rasps were found.
- Tolundipe

==== Central woodland savanna ====
Nearly all of the archaeological sites that have been detected or excavated in this region are found near the modern day city or town of Nkoranza and Techiman.

- Amuowi
- Banda
- Bonoase: Outlines of huts and stone foundations have been excavated.
- Boyase Hill: At this hill, which has a radius of approximately 250 meters, polished stone axes, stone arm rings and projectile points were found. Most curiously, a clay dog figurine was discovered.
- Fiakwase
- Kintampo: First excavated in 1966, evidence of animal husbandry is found here, as well as remnants of sheep, cattle, goats, and larger mammals such as elephants and hippopotamus.
- Jema
- Mumute: Outlines of dwellings and stone foundations have been excavated.
- Nyamogo
- Pumpuano
- Wenchi

==== Southern forest ====
- Boyasi: Outlines of dwellings and stone foundations have been excavated. Large stones of granite with major signs of wear were found at the edge of the village that were used to polish stone tools and decorations.
- Buoho
- Buruburo
- Christian Village: Located near the Atlantic coast near modern-day Accra, clay cylinders have been found at the site which are remnants of ancient dwellings.
- Mampongtin
- Nkobin
- Nkukoa Buoho: This site, located near Boyasi, seems to be a treasure trove of artifacts and features for researchers. Rasps, pottery, and stone tools were found in large numbers.
- Somanya
- Wiwi

== Legacy ==
The rockshelters of Kintampo appear to have been abandoned by the second century BCE, and then in the early first millennium CE, iron metallurgy became the dominant technology of the region.

The area was the home to the Bono people, who founded the Bono State in the 11th century. It was a large kingdom that used firearms traded to it by Europeans to effectively conquer neighboring territories. The Bono enslaved their enemies and prisoners of war from the north and to the Coast, and made a profit by selling them in the transatlantic slave trade. Merchants from Western Sudan , who were mainly into gold trading, also contributed to the growth of the Bono State.

== See also ==
- Kintampo District
- Kirikongo
- Loropéni
- Birimi
