= Iho Eleru =

Archaeological site in Nigeria

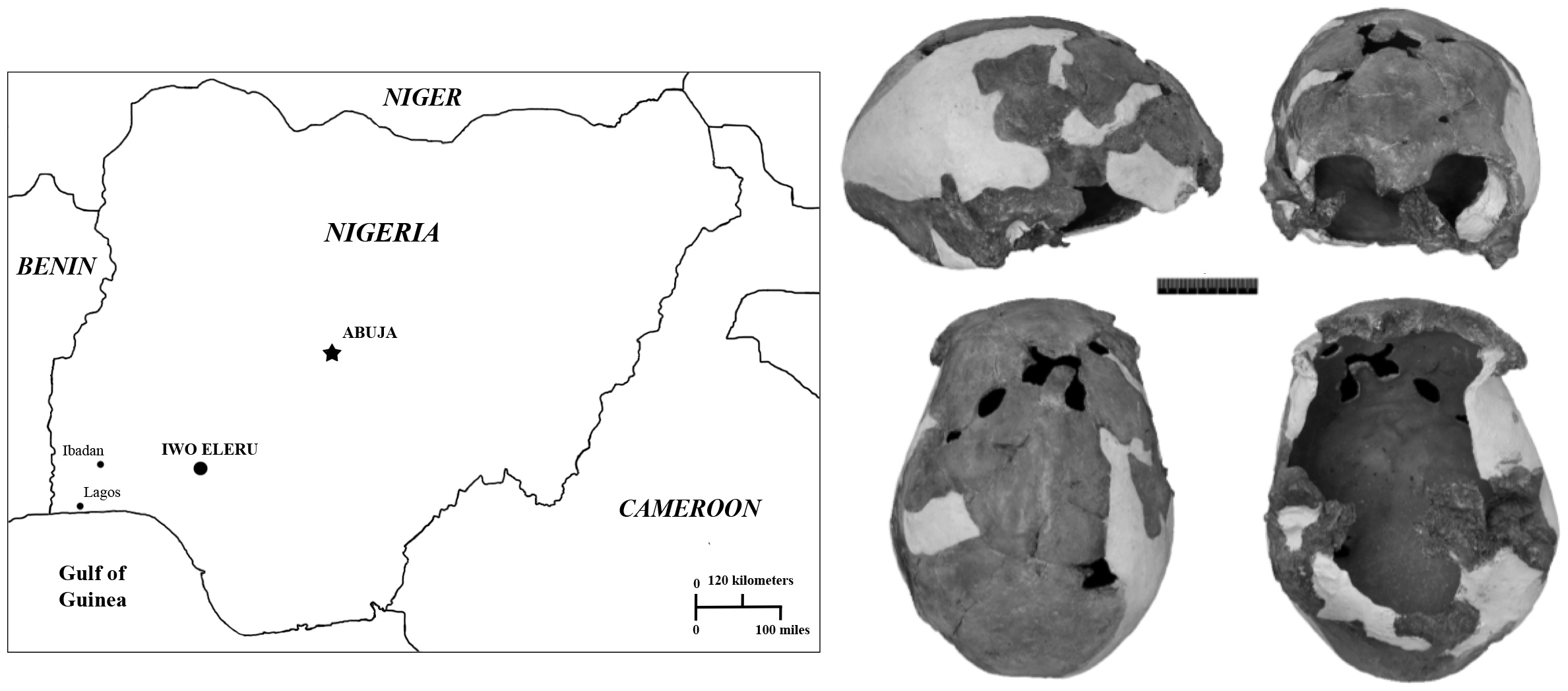
Map of Nigeria with location (left). Views of the Iho Eleru skull (right): side, front, top, bottom

Iho Eleru, formerly known as Iwo Eleeru, is an archaeological site and rock shelter that features Later Stone Age artifacts from during the Late Pleistocene-Holocene transition, which is located in the forest–savanna village of Isarun in Ondo State, Nigeria. The site was initially discovered by Chief Officer J. Akeredolu, in 1961 during a large-scale survey of hilly landscapes around the town of Akure in Ondo State, Nigeria. The name was formerly and commonly known as Iwo Eleru, but the correct name is now regarded as Ihò Eléérú, or Iho Eleru, meaning "Cave of Ashes." The Iho Eleru skull is a notable archaeological discovery from the site which dates to approximately 13,000 years old. It may be evidence of modern humans possessing possible archaic human admixture or of a late-persisting early modern human.

== Name of archaeological site ==
The correct name for the archaeological site is Ihò Eléérú, or Iho Eleru, meaning "Cave of Ashes." This name originates from its common use for fire camps which resulted in a thick ash floor covering most of its superficial surface. The site was previously known as "Iwo Eleru", first reported by Chief Officer J. Akeredolu with the Department of Antiquities in Benin, Nigeria, and published by T. Shaw and S.G.H. Daniels, most probably as an incorrect anglicized translation from its original Yoruba name.

== Archaeology ==
=== Archaeobotany ===
Remnants of endocarps have been directly dated; the results revealed that Canarium schweinfurthii was utilized in 11,300 cal BP as the earliest in the region of West Africa, and that the utilization of canarium, as well as likely oil palm, occurred prior to 10,000 BP.

=== Ceramics ===
Following the emergence of pottery traditions in the Ounjougou region of Mali around 11,900 BP and in the Bosumpra region of Ghana soon after, ceramics later arrived in the Iho Eleru region of Nigeria.

=== Fauna ===
Some fauna found at Iho Eleru includes: bushpig (Potamochoerus porcus), dwarf antelope (Neotragus batesi?), giant pouched rat (Cricetomys sp.), rock hyrax (Procavia capensis), West African black turtle (Pelusios niger), and yellow-backed duiker (Cephalophus silvicultor). Human activity, such as foraging and butchery, occurred at Iho Eleru. Animals that have been confirmed to have been consumed at the site include: African buffalo (Syncerus caffer), African savanna hare (Lepus microtis), crested porcupine (Hystrix cristata), Nile monitor (Varanus niloticus), and Ostrich (Struthio camelus).

=== Iho Eleru skull ===
==== Discovery ====
The Iho Eleru site is a large rock shelter in southwestern Nigeria. The skull was found in 1965 by Thurstan Shaw and his team among over half a million Later Stone Age artifacts at the site. It was found as part of a skeleton that was buried with a thin covering of soil. The skeleton was excavated and encased in plaster, and the skull was separated from the rest of the body.

==== Dating ====
On the basis of charcoal remains that were found surrounding the skeleton, it was initially dated 9250 BC ± 200. However, in a 2011 study conducted by Katerina Harvati, Chris Stringer and others, the dating of the remains was revised: with the help of uranium–thorium dating, a time span of 11.7–16.3 ka was suggested.

==== Description ====
The cranial vault is relatively long and low, and the frontal bone shows moderate recession. The brow ridges are moderately developed for a male and there is no pronounced nasal root. What remains of the nasal area suggest that the nasal bridge was relatively flat, and the evidence from X-rays points to little frontal sinus development.

The upper face is missing except for a small collection of fragments. Parts of the maxillary-molar region have been identified (including the infraorbital foramen) and, based on what survives, it is unlikely that the upper face was large. The mandible is well developed and has a masculine appearance, although there is no pronounced chin. Apart from two lower premolars, the teeth are not attached to the jaws and it is uncertain where the surviving teeth were originally placed. All the anterior teeth show noticeable attrition and most of the crown has been eroded by wear. Based on the evidence of tooth wear, the age of Iho Eleru fossil has been estimated as over 30 years.

What remains of the rest of the skeleton are generally crushed fragments of large bones. The shafts of the humeri appear robust and the cortical bone is moderately thick. The shafts of the radius and femur are also robust. The existing remains suggest he was of medium height and build, and was no taller than approximately 165 cm.

==== Analysis ====
Don Brothwell and Thurstan Shaw said in 1971 that the sloping frontal vault was more pronounced in Iho Eleru fossil than in both later Neolithic and recent sub-Saharan skull samples. However, they also found that the occipital structure, nasal root and the frontal bone of the skull "would qualify for identification as that of a proto-West African negro."

In 1974 Chris Stringer said that there were surprising similarities between the crania of the much older Solo Man and Omo II with that of Iho Eleru. The 2011 study found that "Iwo Eleru possesses neurocranial morphology intermediate in shape between archaic hominins (Neanderthals and Homo erectus) and modern humans." The authors of the study asserted that the dating of Iho Eleru fossil to the late Pleistocene "implies that the transition to anatomical modernity in Africa was more complicated than previously thought, with late survival of "archaic" features and possibly deep population substructure in Africa during this time."

It has been argued that the Iho Eleru fossil was an archaic hybrid or part of a relict archaic Homo population. In 2014 Christopher Stojanowski of Arizona State University summarised the three dominant explanations for Iho Eleru fossil's atypical cranial shape: the first, that Iho Eleru was a hybrid with archaic African populations; the second, that Iho Eleru fossil was a member of a relict archaic population that was replaced by more modern humans upon the onset of the Holocene era; and the third, that Iho Eleru fossil was part of a population that diverged from the rest of North Africa's populations during a time of acute aridness in the Sahara desert that made it impassable until the arrival of the African humid period.

In 2014 Peter J. Waddell of Massey University argued that Iho Eleru man descended from a lineage 200–400 kya and whose extinction may have been caused by humans. Waddell also said: "Such a long apparently distinct lineage that terminated in West Africa perhaps 12 kya, with no obvious sign of living descendants, suggests that the Iho Eleru lineage quite probably represents a distinct species of near modern human. As such, the species name Homo iwoelerueensis suggests itself." However, the University of Washington's Fred L. Bookstein cautions against naming the fossil as a new species until more confirmatory evidence is discovered.

=== Stone tools ===
Roughly half of a million stone tools have been discovered at Iho Eleru.

== See also ==
- Asselar man
