= Isarun =

Isarun usarun Ile-Owuro
- Town

yoruba transcription(s)
- Map showing isarun location in Nigeria
- Coordinates: 7°24′15″N 5°4′1″E
- Country: Nigeria
- State: Ondo State
- Local Government Area: Ifedore
- Time zone: UTC+1 (WAT)

Isarun or Isharun is a town in Ifedore, Ondo State, Nigeria. It lies 24 km of Akure the state capital. The village gained international attraction in 1922 when a hunter, Chief Obele, first discovered the Cave of Ashes (Yorùbá: Ìhò Eléérù).

== Attraction ==
In 1965 English archeologist, Thurstan Shaw and his team visited the thick forest of Isarun where they conducted an extensive research on the place, they worked rigorously and subsequently excavated bones of stone age man in a cave dated to have been around 11,200 years old, other exhumed artifacts such as pottery works dating as far back as 1000 BC, human bones and a cast of skull was said to have been deposited at the University of Ibadan museum and some were reportedly taken to London for research work.
