= Bosumpra Cave =

Archaeological site in Ghana

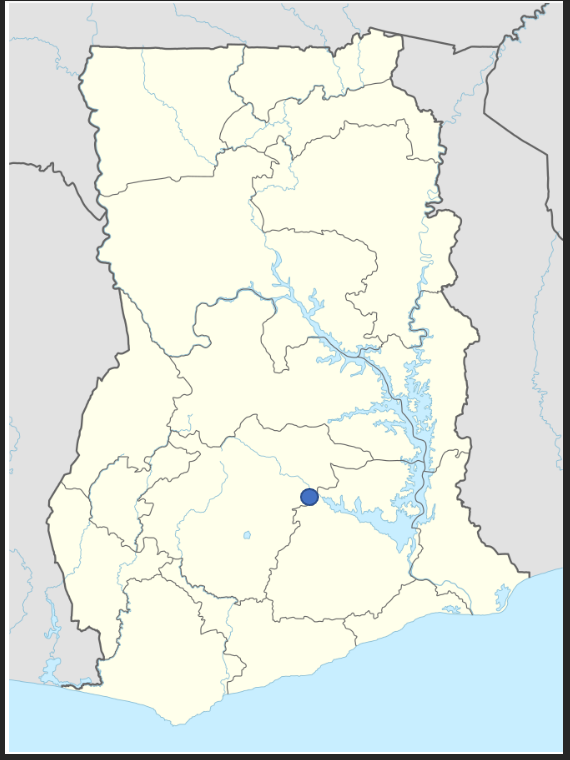
Bosumpra Cave situated on the map of Ghana

Bosumpra Cave (also spelt Bosompra Cave) is an archaeological site situated on the Kwahu plateau, which forms part of the easternmost section of the Ashanti uplands. The plateau and uplands lie just north of the Akan lowlands, and run diagonally across south-central Ghana for c. 200 km from near the western border with the Ivory Coast to the edge of the Volta basin. The site is a rock shelter, which is roughly 240 m² in extent and situated at an elevation of approximately 613 m above sea-level, northeast of the modern town of Abetifi. In the shelter itself, the floor is lowest in the center and slopes upwards towards the northern and southern edges. The rock shelter is also situated in the Bono East region of Ghana, which is archaeologically important because of the large distribution of prehistoric Kintampo-sites here.

== Excavation history ==
Thurstan Shaw directed a pioneering excavation within Bosumpra Cave in 1943. Shaw’s excavation, to a depth of 1.5 m, documented two episodes of occupation: a long prehistoric period, characterized by a prolific microlithic industry and small quantities of rare, decorated pottery and a later ‘‘pre-Akan/Akan’’ historical period with iron and pottery.

Re-excavation by Andrew Smith in 1973/1974 provided the first radiocarbon dates and macro botanical remains. These bracketed the upper section of the site's occupation sequence between 4500 cal. BC and cal. AD 1400. Bosumpra Cave was the first site of its kind to be excavated in Ghana, and although it is frequently cited in literature and discussions concerning the West African Late Stone Age, the significance and interpretation of its occupational sequence and material culture have been a matter of speculation.

Bosumpra Cave was re-excavated during the ‘Forest Occupations of Ghana Project’ between 2008 and 2011. The project also included the re-excavation of the sites of Apreku and Akyekyema Bour, as well as the excavation of the Gyaape rockshelters, the small-scale rescue excavation of Awhene Koko, and an extensive survey of the project area. These re-excavations of Bosumpra Cave revealed that the site's earliest occupation/exploitation dates from the mid-eleventh millennium cal. BC and continued throughout the Holocene. The site has more recently functioned as a shrine to the deity Pra and is in use today as a Christian church. Bosumpra Cave is unique in Ghana as it provides the longest archaeological sequence yet found, but it is also the first excavation of an LSA site to provide data on non-Kintampo populations.

== Origin of the name ==
The site derives its name from abosom (singular obosom), meaning ‘lesser gods’ in the traditional Akan religion , who predominantly inhabit lakes and rivers. Bosumpra Cave was previously the abode of the local tete bosom (tutelary deity) of the Pra River, traditionally sourced in the Kwahu region to Twendurase. Obosom Pra is one of the ‘sons of the supreme Sky God’, although Smith describes the deity as one of the four main “abosom” of the Guan pantheon.

== Archaeological sequence ==
=== Late Stone Age (11 000 cal. BC – 500 cal. BC) ===
Bosumpra Cave was occupied from at least the mid-eleventh millennium cal. BC is both a shelter and a workshop. Some of the earliest examples of pottery in Sub-Saharan West Africa come from Bosumpra, where stratigraphic and chronological data indicate that geometric microliths, partially polished celts, and ceramics formed the basis of a distinctive adaptation on the Kwahu Plateau from the tenth millennium cal. BC. Moreover, evidence from Bosumpra demonstrates a persistent bifacial technology (points/celts). The early tenth millennium cal. BC pottery from Bosumpra is solidly manufactured and decorated with channeling and impressed peigne fileté rigide.

In terms of stone artefacts, the assemblage from Bosumpra Cave differs from many of those known from Central Africa in its predominance of geometric microliths (and celts). The occupants of the site utilized (geometric) microliths and bifacial macroliths from the late eleventh millennium cal. BC until the seventeenth century cal. AD.

Bosumpra Cave was probably occupied periodically throughout its use history, and given the site’s prominence within the landscape, it may have been a ‘central place’ in a network procuring resources from both lowland and highland regions and contiguous ecotones.

=== The Atetefo (1200-1600 cal. AD) ===
In this period, we witness a decline in non-local lithic raw materials and quartz tools, accompanied by scanty evidence for metallurgy. Continuity with the artefacts from the LSA is evident in the lithic industry (i.e. in geometric microliths and bipolar reduction), the presence of celts and aspects of the ceramic repertoire, although some clear changes are evident in vessel and rim morphology, decorative motifs and fashioning methods. The persistence of stone technology at Bosumpra demonstrates its local importance as it continued alongside metallurgy to form part of a repertoire of technical knowledge transmitted across generations until the seventeenth century. The Kwahu Plateau also either initially or eventually formed part of the area of influence or settlement of those manufacturing Atetefo ware.

=== The Akan (late 17th century onwards) ===
The Kwahu Plateau was presumed to be either uninhabited before the events described in the traditions or to have been settled by the Kwaemfo during this period. This region was probably sparsely settled, with its inhabitants living mostly in caves. In Bosumpra Cave, the ebb and flow of empires and the economic and political prominence of Abetifi are not even obliquely referenced by the material culture found in the archaeological layer, although it does hold relevance for understanding other dramatic transformations on the Kwahu Plateau. The ceramic assemblage from here provides little evidence for discontinuity. The only obvious developments involve the appearance of the wavy channeling motif and the virtual disappearance of the site’s ground stone and lithic industry.

== See also ==
- Abetifi Stone Age Park
