= Population history of West Africa =

West African population history

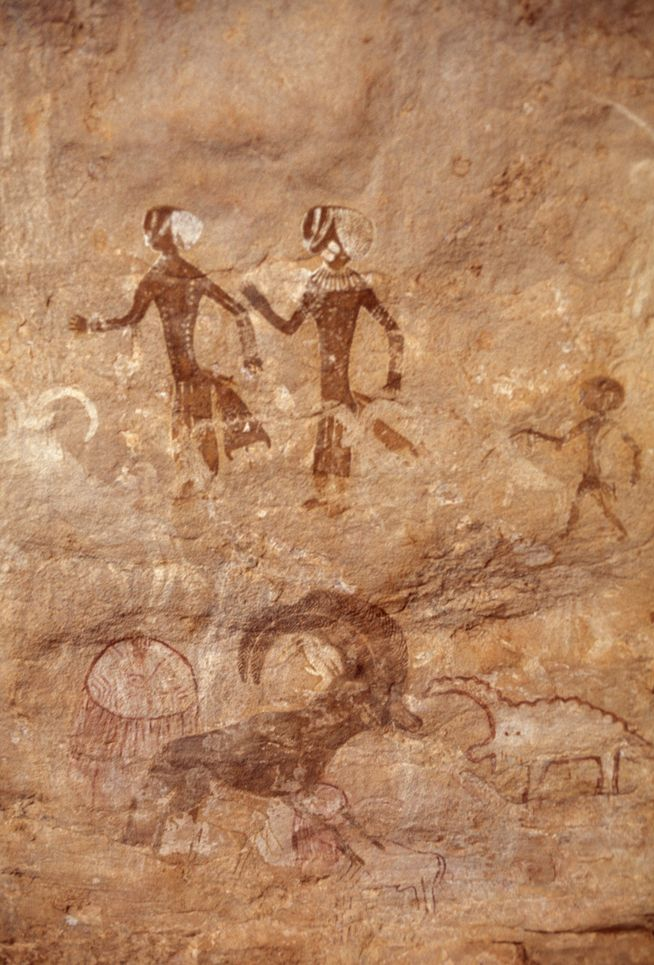
Round Head rock art figures and zoomorphic figures, including a Barbary sheep

The population history of West Africa is composed of West African populations that were considerably mobile and interacted with one another throughout the history of West Africa. Acheulean tool-using archaic humans may have dwelled throughout West Africa since at least between 780,000 BP and 126,000 BP (Middle Pleistocene). During the Pleistocene, Middle Stone Age peoples (e.g., Iwo Eleru people, possibly Aterians), who dwelled throughout West Africa between MIS 4 (71,000 BP) and MIS 2 (29,000 BP, Last Glacial Maximum), were gradually replaced by incoming Late Stone Age peoples, who migrated into West Africa as an increase in humid conditions resulted in the subsequent expansion of the West African forest. West African hunter-gatherers occupied western Central Africa (e.g., Shum Laka) earlier than 32,000 BP, dwelled throughout coastal West Africa by 12,000 BP, and migrated northward between 12,000 BP and 8000 BP as far as Mali, Burkina Faso, and Mauritania.

During the Holocene, Niger-Congo speakers independently created pottery in Ounjougou, Mali – the earliest pottery in Africa – by at least 9400 BCE, and along with their pottery, as well as wielding independently invented bows and arrows, migrated into the Central Sahara, which became their primary region of residence by 10,000 BP. The emergence and expansion of ceramics in the Sahara may be linked with the origin of Round Head and Kel Essuf rock art, which occupy rockshelters in the same regions (e.g., Djado, Acacus, Tadrart). Hunters in the Central Sahara farmed, stored, and cooked undomesticated central Saharan flora, underwent domestication of antelope, and domesticated and shepherded Barbary sheep. After the Kel Essuf Period and Round Head Period of the Central Sahara, the Pastoral Period followed. Some of the hunter-gatherers who created the Round Head rock art may have adopted pastoral culture, and others may have not. As a result of increasing aridification of the Green Sahara, Central Saharan hunter-gatherers and cattle herders may have used seasonal waterways as the migratory route taken to the Niger River and Chad Basin of West Africa. In 2000 BCE, "Thiaroye Woman", also known as the "Venus of Thiaroye," may have been the earliest statuette created in Sub-Saharan West Africa; it may have particularly been a fertility statuette, created in the region of Senegambia, and may be associated with the emergence of complexly organized pastoral societies in West Africa between 4000 BCE and 1000 BCE. Though possibly developed as early as 5000 BCE, Nsibidi may have also developed in 2000 BCE, as evidenced by depictions of the West African script on Ikom monoliths at Ikom, in Nigeria. Migration of Saharan peoples south of the Sahelian region resulted in seasonal interaction with and gradual absorption of West African hunter-gatherers, who primarily dwelt in the savannas and forests of West Africa. In West Africa, which may have been a major regional cradle in Africa for the domestication of crops and animals, Niger-Congo speakers domesticated the helmeted guineafowl between 5500 BP and 1300 BP; domestication of field crops occurred throughout various locations in West Africa, such as yams (d. praehensilis) in the Niger River basin between eastern Ghana and western Nigeria (northern Benin), rice (oryza glaberrima) in the Inner Niger Delta region of Mali, pearl millet (cenchrus americanus) in northern Mali and Mauritania, and cowpeas in northern Ghana. After having persisted as late as 1000 BP, or some period of time after 1500 CE, remaining West African hunter-gatherers, many of whom dwelt in the forest-savanna region, were ultimately acculturated and admixed into the larger groups of West African agriculturalists, akin to the migratory Bantu-speaking agriculturalists and their encounters with Central African hunter-gatherers.

With the emergence of the West African Iron Age, iron metallurgy developed in ancient West African civilizations, such as Tichitt culture and Nok culture. Following the flourishing of Iron Age West African civilizations, periods of mass enslavement, such as the Trans-Atlantic slave trade, contributed to the depopulation of West Africa. At least 6,284,092 West Africans are estimated to have been enslaved and taken captive during the Trans-Atlantic slave trade; along with Africans enslaved and taken captive in other embarking regions of Africa, such as Central Africa and Southern Africa, as well as between at least 12% and 13% of enslaved Africans taken captive estimated to have died during the Middle Passage, the overall number of Africans enslaved and taken captive during the Trans-Atlantic slave trade is estimated to have been at least 12,521,335. During the modern period, the population of West Africa is estimated to have increased from 69,564,958 in 1950 CE to 413,340,896 in 2021 CE.

== Climate ==
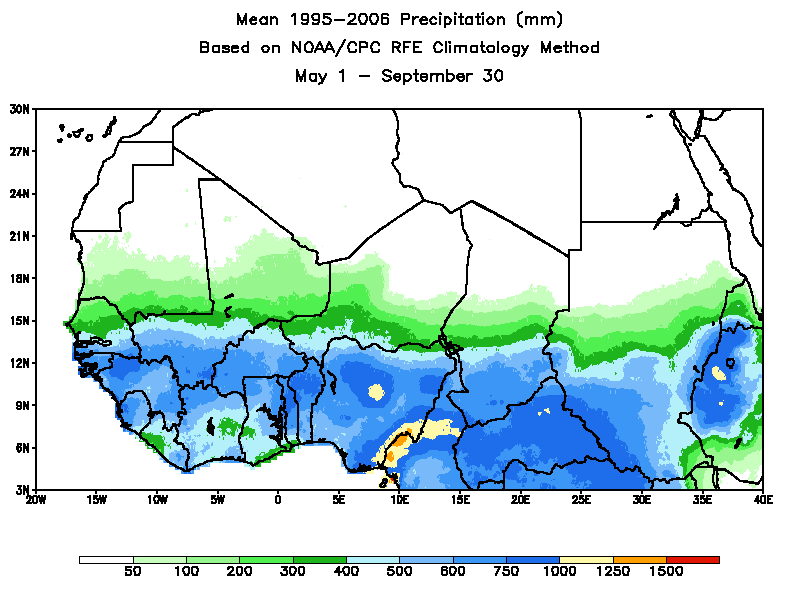
West African monsoon season

=== Early Stone Age ===
In the Falémé River Valley zone, with the exception of stadial phases and interstadial phases, there has been a fairly steady state of humidity and temperature throughout a span of 120,000 years. Additionally, for at least the previous 100,000 years, the presence of flora (e.g., trees) has remained quite consistent. Consequently, this region has remained habitable for human populations, from the Early Stone Age, through the Middle Stone Age, to the Later Stone Age. Furthermore, for the previous 100,000 years, compared to the climate of East Africa, the Pleistocene climate in West Africa has been more steady and humid.

In the Atakora mountainous zone, the Pleistocene climate has supported continuity in human habitation, from the Early Stone Age, through the Middle Stone Age, to the Later Stone Age, which spanned the previous 120,000 years.

=== Middle Stone Age ===
In the Falémé River Valley zone, with the exception of stadial phases and interstadial phases, there has been a fairly steady state of humidity and temperature throughout a span of 120,000 years. Additionally, for at least the previous 100,000 years, the presence of flora (e.g., trees) has remained quite consistent. Consequently, this region has remained habitable for human populations, from the Early Stone Age, through the Middle Stone Age, to the Later Stone Age. Furthermore, for the previous 100,000 years, compared to the climate of East Africa, the Pleistocene climate in West Africa has been more steady and humid.

In the Jos Plateau zone, the Pleistocene climate has fluctuated mostly during stadial phases and interstadial phases, throughout the previous 120,000 years; specifically, stable climate occurred between MIS 4 and MIS 2, and climate fluctuations occurred during the periods and sub-periods of MIS 1 and MIS 5. Consequently, the human habitation in Jos Plateau, which is only composed of Middle Stone Age sites, has been distinct in terms of culture and environment in comparison to the Falémé River Valley.

In the Atakora mountainous zone, the Pleistocene climate has supported continuity in human habitation, from the Early Stone Age, through the Middle Stone Age, to the Later Stone Age, which spanned the previous 120,000 years.

=== Later Stone Age ===
In the Falémé River Valley zone, with the exception of stadial phases and interstadial phases, there has been a fairly steady state of humidity and temperature throughout a span of 120,000 years. Additionally, for at least the previous 100,000 years, the presence of flora (e.g., trees) has remained quite consistent. Consequently, this region has remained habitable for human populations, from the Early Stone Age, through the Middle Stone Age, to the Later Stone Age. Furthermore, for the previous 100,000 years, compared to the climate of East Africa, the Pleistocene climate in West Africa has been more steady and humid.

In the Atakora mountainous zone, the Pleistocene climate has supported continuity in human habitation, from the Early Stone Age, through the Middle Stone Age, to the Later Stone Age, which spanned the previous 120,000 years.

In 15,000 BP, the West African monsoon transformed the landscape of Africa and began the Green Sahara period; greater rainfall during the summer season resulted in the growth of humid conditions (e.g., lakes, wetlands) and the savanna (e.g., grassland, shrubland) in North Africa. Between 5500 BP and 4000 BP, the Green Sahara period ended.

=== Pastoral Neolithic ===
By 4500 BP, sources of water in the Sahara had dried, and subsequently, drought occurred, which resulted in a decrease in the presence of humidity in the region. Concurrent with the decrease of humidity in the Sahara, between 3500 BP and 2500 BP, there was an increase of humidity in the Sahel.

=== Iron Age ===
During the 1st millennium cal BCE, between the Later Stone Age and Early Iron Age, the environment was conducive for the growth of pearl millet in the Lake Chad Basin.

== Material culture and archaeological data ==
=== Early Stone Age ===
Acheulean tool-using archaic humans may have dwelled throughout West Africa since at least between 780,000 BP and 126,000 BP (Middle Pleistocene).

=== Middle Stone Age ===
Middle Stone Age West Africans likely dwelled continuously in West Africa between MIS 4 and MIS 2 and likely were not present in West Africa before MIS 5. Amid MIS 5, Middle Stone Age West Africans may have migrated across the West Sudanian savanna and continued to reside in the region (e.g., West Sudanian savanna, West African Sahel). In the Late Pleistocene, Middle Stone Age West Africans began to dwell along parts of the forest and coastal region of West Africa (e.g., Tiemassas, Senegal). More specifically, by at least 61,000 BP, Middle Stone Age West Africans may have begun to migrate south of the West Sudanian savanna, and, by at least 25,000 BP, may have begun to dwell near the coast of West Africa. Amid aridification in MIS 5 and regional change of climate in MIS 4, in the Sahara and the Sahel, Aterians may have migrated southward into West Africa (e.g., Baie du Levrier, Mauritania; Tiemassas, Senegal; Lower Senegal River Valley).

=== Later Stone Age ===
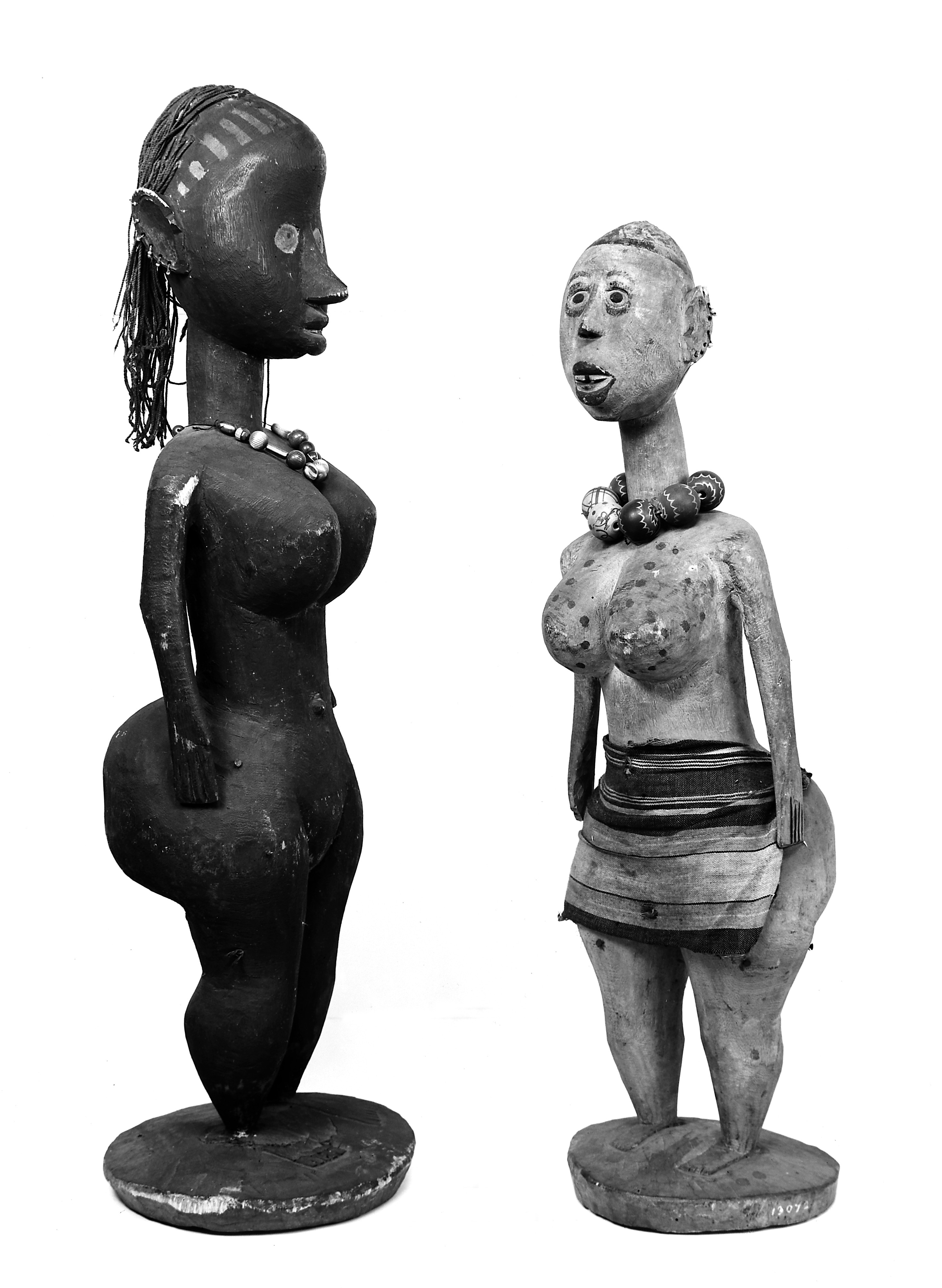
Representations of West African hunter-gatherers from the Dahomey region of Benin

Earlier than 32,000 BP, or by 30,000 BP, Late Stone Age West African hunter-gatherers were dwelling in the forests of western Central Africa (e.g., earlier than 32,000 BP at de Maret in Shum Laka, 12,000 BP at Mbi Crater). An excessively dry Ogolian period occurred, spanning from 20,000 BP to 12,000 BP. By 15,000 BP, the number of settlements made by Middle Stone Age West Africans decreased as there was an increase in humid conditions, expansion of the West African forest, and increase in the number of settlements made by Late Stone Age West African hunter-gatherers. Macrolith-using late Middle Stone Age peoples (e.g., the possibly archaic human admixed or late-persisting early modern human Iwo Eleru fossils of the late Middle Stone Age), who dwelled in Central Africa, to western Central Africa, to West Africa, were displaced by microlith-using Late Stone Age Africans (e.g., non-archaic human admixed Late Stone Age Shum Laka fossils dated between 7000 BP and 3000 BP) as they migrated from Central Africa, to western Central Africa, into West Africa. Between 16,000 BP and 12,000 BP, Late Stone Age West Africans began dwelling in the eastern and central forested regions (e.g., Ghana, Ivory Coast, Nigeria; between 18,000 BP and 13,000 BP at Temet West and Asokrochona in the southern region of Ghana, 13,050 ± 230 BP at Bingerville in the southern region of Ivory Coast, 11,200 ± 200 BP at Iwo Eleru in Nigeria) of West Africa. By 11,000 BP, the late settlement made by Middle Stone Age West Africans and earliest settlement made by Late Stone Age West African hunter-gatherers emerged in the westernmost region (e.g., Falémé Valley, Senegal) of West Africa. Middle Stone Age West Africans and Late Stone Age West African hunter-gatherers likely did not become admixed with one another and were culturally and ecologically distinct from one another.

In the 10th millennium BCE, Niger-Congo speakers developed pyrotechnology and employed subsistence strategy at Ounjougou, Mali. Prior to 9400 BCE, Niger-Congo speakers independently created and used matured ceramic technology (e.g., pottery, pots) to contain and cook grains (e.g., Digitaria exilis, pearl millet); ethnographically and historically, West African women have been the creators of pottery in most West African ceramic traditions and their production of ceramics is closely associated with creativity and fertility. Amid the tenth millennium BCE, microlith-using West Africans migrated into and dwelt in Ounjougou alongside earlier residing West Africans in Ounjougou. Among two existing cultural areas, earlier residing West Africans in Ounjougou were of a cultural area encompassing the Sahara region (e.g., Tenere, Niger/Chad; Air, Niger; Acacus, Libya/Algeria; Tagalagal, Niger; Temet, Niger) of Africa and microlith-using West Africans were of a cultural area encompassing the forest region of West Africa.

Following the Ogolian period, between the late 10th millennium BCE and the early 9th millennium BCE, the creators of the Ounjougou pottery – the earliest pottery in Africa – migrated, along with their pottery, from Ounjougou, Mali into the Central Sahara. The emergence and expansion of ceramics in the Sahara may be linked with the origin of both the Round Head and Kel Essuf rock art, which occupy rockshelters in the same regions (e.g., Djado, Acacus, Tadrart) as well as have a common resemblance (e.g., traits, shapes). Whether or not Ounjougou ceramic culture spread as far as Bir Kiseiba, Egypt, which had pottery that resembled Ounjougou pottery, had implements used for grinding like at Ounjougou, and was followed by subsequent ceramic cultures (e.g., Wadi el Akhdar, Sarurab, Nabta Playa), remains to be determined. Between 8200 BCE and 6400 BCE, Central Saharan hunter-gatherers of Libya (e.g., Takarkori, Uan Afuda) gathered a diverse selection of flora (e.g., aquatic plants from lakes, grasses from savanna grasslands) and used ceramic pots to process and cook the flora. By 10,000 BP, the primary region of residence for Niger-Congo speakers, who wielded bows and arrows, may have been the southern region of the Central Sahara. Amid an early period of the Holocene, semi-settled Epipaleolithic and Mesolithic hunters, who created a refined material culture (e.g., stone tools, decorated pottery) as early as 10,000 BP, also created the engraved Kel Essuf and painted Round Head rock art styles located in the region (e.g., some in the Acacus, some in the Tadrart, some in the Jebel Uweinat) of Libya, in the region (e.g., some in the Tadrart, most abundant in Tassili n'Ajjer) of Algeria, in the region (e.g., Djado) of Nigeria, and the region (e.g., Djado) of Niger. Amid the early Sahara, Round Head rock artists, who had a sophisticated culture and engaged in the activity of hunting and gathering, also developed pottery, used vegetation, and managed animals. The cultural importance of shepherded Barbary sheep (Ammotragus lervia) is shown via their presence in Round Head rock art throughout the Central Sahara (e.g., Libyan region of Tadrart Acacus, Algerian region of Tassili n'Ajjer). Barbary sheep were corralled in stone enclosures near Uan Afuda cave. From up to 9500 BP, this continued until the beginning of the Pastoral Neolithic in the Sahara. Between 7500 BCE and 3500 BCE, amid the Green Sahara, undomesticated central Saharan flora were farmed, stored, and cooked, and domesticated animals (e.g., Barbary sheep) were milked and managed, by hunter-gatherers near the Takarkori rockshelter, which is representative of the broader Sahara; this continued until the beginning of the Pastoral Neolithic in the Sahara.

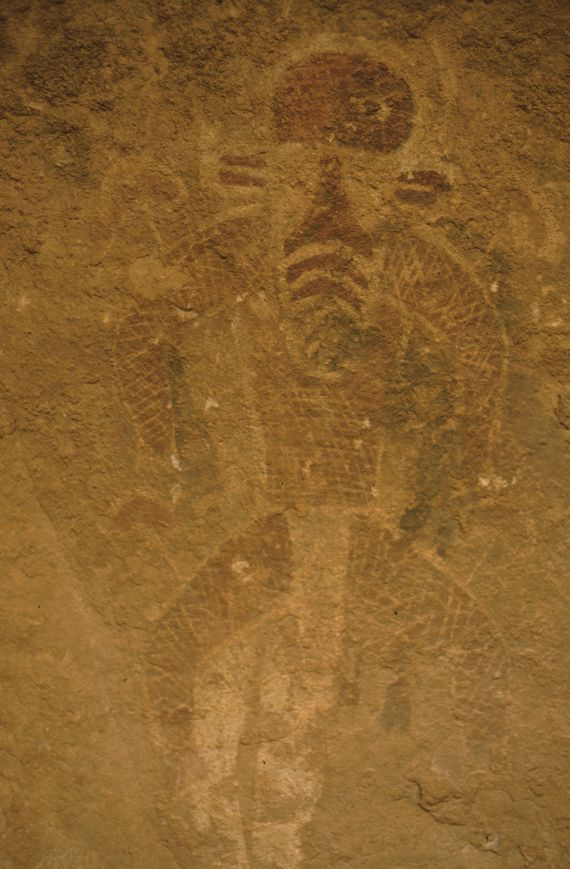
Round Head figure wearing a Barbary sheep-styled mask

=== Pastoral Neolithic ===
As cattle pastoralism (also known as the African cattle complex) had endured in the Sahara since 7500 BP, amid the Pastoral period, Central Saharan hunters and herders may have lived together in a common area for a long period of time. The Round Head painting tradition was brought to its formal conclusion as the Green Sahara underwent desertification. Desertification may have resulted in migrations from the Central Saharan region, where the Round Head paintings are located, toward Lake Chad, the Niger Delta, and the Nile Valley. While some migrated south of the Sahara, other Central Saharan hunter-gatherers may have taken on the custom of pastoralism (e.g., herding domesticated cattle and goats). Meanwhile, as late as 2500 BP in the Central Sahara, some of the creators of the Round Head rock art may have continued to persist as hunters.

Preceded by assumed earlier sites in the Eastern Sahara, tumuli with megalithic monuments developed as early as 4700 BCE in the Saharan region of Niger. These megalithic monuments in the Saharan region of Niger and the Eastern Sahara may have served as antecedents for the mastabas and pyramids of ancient Egypt. During Predynastic Egypt, tumuli were present at various locations (e.g., Naqada, Helwan). The prehistoric tradition of monarchic tumuli-building is shared by both the West African Sahel and the Middle Nile regions. Ancient Egyptian pyramids of the early dynastic period and Meroitic Kush pyramids are recognized by Faraji (2022) as part of and derived from an earlier architectural "Sudanic-Sahelian" tradition of monarchic tumuli, which are characterized as "earthen pyramids" or "proto-pyramids." Faraji (2022) characterized Nobadia as the "last pharaonic culture of the Nile Valley" and described mound tumuli as being "the first architectural symbol of the sovereign's return and reunification with the primordial mound upon his death." Faraji (2022) indicates that there may have been a cultural expectation of "postmortem resurrection" associated with tumuli in the funerary traditions of the West African Sahel (e.g., northern Ghana, northern Nigeria, Mali) and Nile Valley (e.g., Ballana, Qustul, Kerma, Kush). Based on artifacts found in the tumuli from West Africa and Nubia, there may have been "a highly developed corporate ritual in which the family members of the deceased brought various items as offerings and tribute to the ancestors" buried in the tumuli and the tumuli may have "served as immense shrines of spiritual power for the populace to ritualize and remember their connection to the ancestral lineage as consecrated in the royal tomb." Between the 8th millennia BCE and the 4th millennia BCE, riverine farmers and savanna herders traversed the interconnected region of the Middle Nile Valley. In the Saharan-Sahelian and Middle Nile Valley regions, dotted wavy line and wavy line pottery, which was produced between the 8th millennia BCE and the 4th millennia BCE (late Neolithic and early Bronze Age), preceded the emergence of monarchic tumuli; the spread of the pottery spanned from the savanna region to the eastern Saharan region, and from Mauritania to the Red Sea, which supports the conclusions of trade between the regions and their interconnectedness. Wavy-line pottery developed six ceramic subvariants and dotted wavy-line pottery developed three ceramic subvariants; the locations for the earliest development of both 8th millennium BCE potteries were at Sagai and Sarurab in Sudan. Wavy-line pottery spread throughout multiple locations (e.g., mostly in Central Nile; some in Hoggar Mountains, southern Algeria, Delibo Cave, Chad, Jebel Eghei, Chad, Tibesti, Chad, and Adrar Madet, Niger) in Africa. Dotted wavy-line pottery spread throughout multiple locations (e.g., Ennedi Plateau, Niger Plateau, and Wadi Howar of Saharan-Sahelian region, interconnecting the regions of the Middle Nile River, Lake Chad, and Benue-Niger River) in Africa as well. Both potteries also spread along a north-to-west regional axis (e.g., Wadi Howar, Ennedi Plateau, Chad, Jebel Uweinat, Gilf Kebir, Egypt) near the Saharan regions of Sudan and Egypt. The tumuli from the kingdom of Kerma serve as a regional intermediary between the regions of the Nile River and the Niger River.

The "Classical Sudanese" monarchic tumuli-building tradition, which lasted in Sudan (e.g., Kerma, Makuria, Meroe, Napata, Nobadia) until the early period of the 6th century CE as well as in West Africa and Central Africa until the 14th century CE, notably preceded the spread of Islam into the West African and Sahelian regions of Africa. According to al-Bakrī, "the construction of tumuli and the accompanying rituals was a religious endeavor that emanated from the other elements" that he described, such as "sorcerers, sacred groves, idols, offerings to the dead, and the "tombs of their kings."" Faraji (2022) indicated that the early dynastic period of ancient Egypt, Kerma of Kush, and the Nobadian culture of Ballana were similar to al-Bakrī's descriptions of the Mande tumuli practices of ancient Ghana. A characteristic of divine kingship sometimes includes monarchic funerary practices (e.g., Ancient Egyptian funerary practices). In the lake region of Niger, two human burial sites included funerary rooms with graves that contain various bones (e.g., human, animal) and items (e.g., beads, ornaments, weapons). In the Inland Niger Delta, 11th century CE and 15th century CE tumuli at El Oualedji and Koï Gourrey contained various bones (e.g., human, horse), human items (e.g., beads, bracelets, rings), and animal items (e.g., bells, harnesses, plaques). Cultural similarities were also found with a Malinke king of Gambia, who along with his senior queen, human subjects within his kingdom, and his weapons, were buried in his home under a large mound the size of the house, as described by V. Fernandes. Levtzion also acknowledged the cultural similarities between the monarchic tumuli-building traditions and practices (e.g., monumental Senegambian megaliths) of West Africa, such as Senegambia, Inland Niger Delta, and Mali, and the Nile Valley; these monarchic tumuli-building practices span the Sudanian savanna as manifestations of a trans-Sahelian common culture and heritage. From the 5th millennium BCE to the 14th century CE, earthen and stone tumuli were developed between Senegambia and Chad. Among 10,000 burial mounds in Senegambia, 3,000 megalithic burial mounds in Senegambia were constructed between 200 BCE and 100 CE, and 7,000 earthen burial mounds in Senegal were constructed in the 2nd millennium CE. Between 1st century CE and 15th century CE, megalithic monuments without tumuli were constructed. Megalithic and earthen Senegambian tumuli, which may have been constructed by the Wolof people (Serer people) or Sosse people (Mande peoples). Sudanese tumuli (e.g., Kerma, C-Group), which date to the mid-3rd millennium BCE, share cultural similarities with Senegambian tumuli. Between the 6th century CE and 14th century CE, stone tumuli circles, which at a single site usually encircle a burial site of half-meter that is covered by a burial mound, were constructed in Komaland; the precursors for this 3rd millennium BCE tumuli style of Komaland, Ghana and Senegambia are regarded by Faraji (2022) to be Kerma Kush and the A-Group culture of ancient Nubia. While the stele-circled burial mounds of C-Group culture of Nubia are regarded as precursors for the megalithic burial mounds of Senegambia, Kerma tumuli are regarded as precursors for the stone tumuli circles of Komaland. Based on a founding narrative of the Hausa people, Faraji (2022) concludes the possibility of the "pre-Islamic rulers of Hausaland" being a "dynasty of female monarchs reminiscent of the kandake of Meroitic Kush." The tumuli of Durbi Takusheyi, which have been dated between the 13th century CE and the 16th century CE, may have connection to tumuli from Ballana and Makuria. Tumuli have also been found at Kissi, in Burkina Faso, and at Daima, in Nigeria.

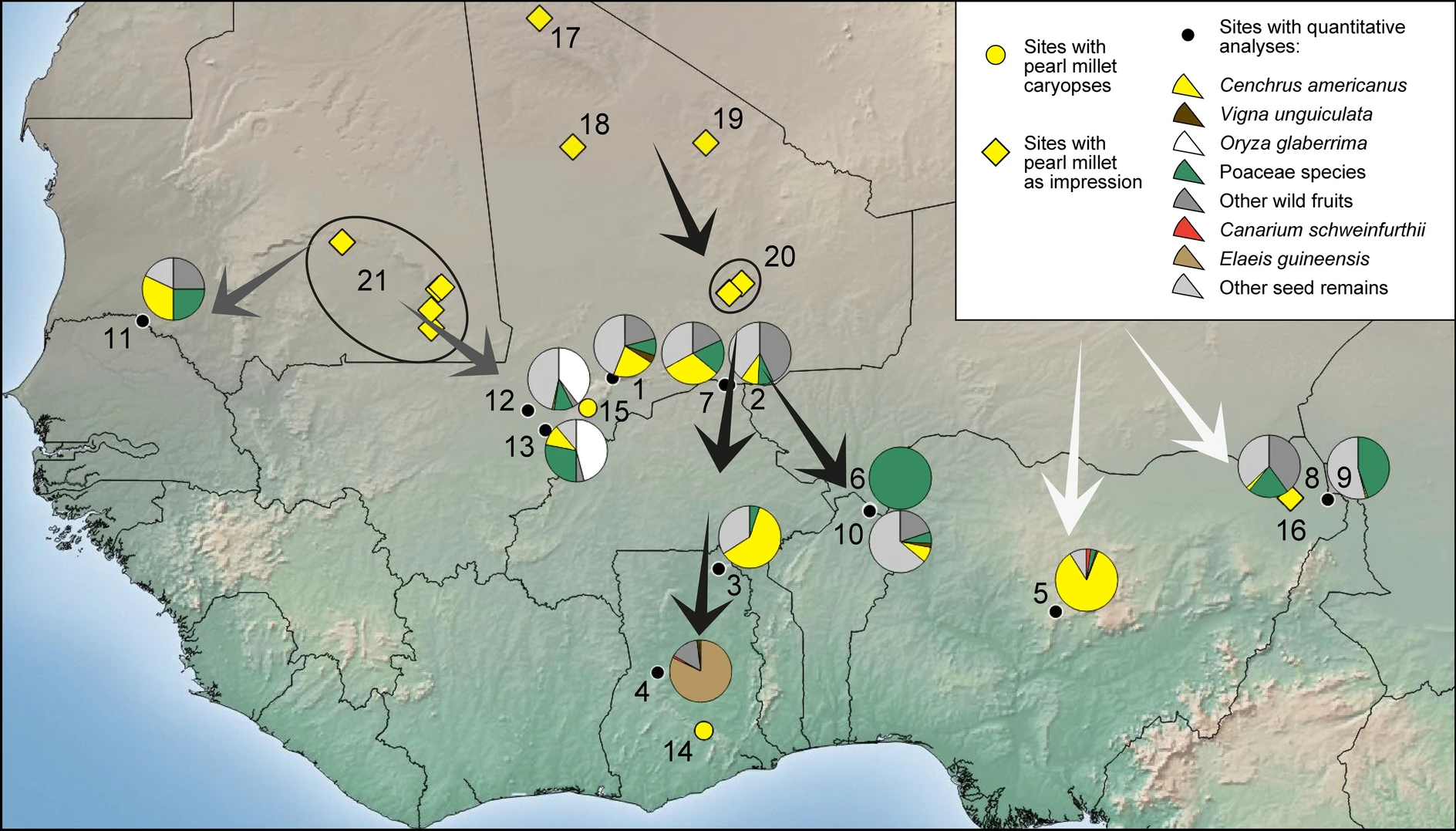
West African sites with archaeobotanical remains from third to first millennium cal bc. The arrows indicate directions of pearl millet diffusion into sub-Saharan West Africa.

Herders from the Central Sahara migrated southward toward areas more fit for pastoralism, as the Green Sahara became increasingly dry after 3500 BCE. Seasonal waterways were the likely migratory route taken, by hunter-gatherers and cattle herders, to the Niger River and Chad Basin. Dwelling in the Sahelian region began to occur as long inhabited settlement and funerary sites of the northern region of Niger stopped being used. Migration of Central Saharan peoples into the Sahelian region of Sub-Saharan Africa is verified via Saharan influenced pottery that appear in the Sahelian region. Herders from the Sahara expanded, along with their cord-wrapped, roulette-detailed ceramic culture and the agricultural practice of pearl millet, throughout West Africa. Saharan roulette-detailed ceramics may be associated with herding cultures from southern Algeria or pre-herding cultures from Niger. After the first half of the 3rd millennium BCE, domesticated pearl millet emerged for the first time near the Saharan and Sahelian regional boundary, thereafter, it expanded into the Sahelian and West Sudanian savanna regional boundary of Sub-Saharan Africa. In adaptation to desertification, Saharan herders developed agriculture as an additional subsistence strategy. As an adaptation to the desertification of the Sahara amid the Green Sahara period, Saharan herders may have begun increasingly using undomesticated flora near seasonally developed and local water sources (e.g., streams, ponds), and thus, contributed to the increased use and agricultural spread of pearl millet. After 2500 BCE, desertification of the Green Sahara may have resulted in Saharan herders traversing further south in West Africa. In 2000 BCE, "Thiaroye Woman", also known as the "Venus of Thiaroye," may have been the earliest statuette created in Sub-Saharan West Africa; it may have particularly been a fertility statuette, created in the region of Senegambia; the Thiaroye figure, which was found among quartz, flint, and ceramic fragments and atop a tumulus, may be associated with the emergence of complexly organized pastoral societies in West Africa between 4000 BCE and 1000 BCE. Amid the 2nd millennium BCE, agriculture, likely along with cord-wrapped, roulette-detailed ceramics, spread throughout the Sahelian and West Sudanian savanna regions of West Africa. Cultural experience with the desertification of the Green Sahara may have contributed to adept adjustment to the drying of the Sahelian and West Sudanian savanna regions of Sub-Saharan Africa by agropastoralists. Agropastoralists, as early agriculturalists, who likely originated in the Central Sahara, began to migrate southward into these regions around 2200 BCE. Agropastoralists traversed through Tilemsi Valley and Ounjougou. Additional adaptations to desertification of the southern Sahara may have been the development of transhumance, which was engaged in seasonally among some agricultural herders, and the increased development of cord-wrapped roulette-detailed ceramics in Sub-Saharan Africa, which likely was first developed in the early period of the Holocene in the Central Sahara. While also hunting and gathering, agropastoralists engaged in agriculture on a seasonal basis. Earlier subsistence strategies involved a combined approach (e.g., agriculture, pastoralism, hunting, foraging). Later, migratory herding, which is solely reliant on pastoralism, developed, and divergence between modern migratory herders and settled agriculturalists occurred. After 1400 BCE and before 800 BCE the spread of agriculture may have been altered, and greening of the western Sahel occurred amid the 2nd millennium BCE. Spread of domesticated pearl millet may reached Lake Chad, via eastern spread from the Niger River or an alternative avenue from the Central Sahara. Increased dryness began to recur after 800 BCE in West Africa and Central Africa. Amid the 1st millennium BCE, agriculture spread, not only near Lake Chad, but near the Niger Delta, Senegal Valley, Jos Plateau, and the southern region of Cameroon.

With exception to some parts of West Africa (e.g., Ntereso, Kintampo), prior to the late first millennium BCE, West African hunter-gatherers, who were the most widely spread cultural group of socially organized populations, were likely the only group to populate the forest and savanna regions of West Africa. The expansion of West African hunter-gatherers north, toward the Sahelian region of the Middle Niger, led to interaction with populations from further north. Prior to initial encounter with migrating populations from further north, West African hunter-gatherers may have already engaged in basic agricultural production of tubers as well as using Elaeis guineensis and Canarium schweinfurthii. After interaction began, some West African hunter-gatherers may have acquired knowledge of pottery and polished stone production, which then spread further southward onto other West African hunter-gatherers, while others may have acquired knowledge of pastoralism. Continued interaction may have resulted in further acculturation (e.g., loss of West African hunter-gatherer languages). Isolated groups of West African hunter-gatherers may have continually dwelled throughout the region of the Pays Mande mountains after the development of metallurgy. West African hunter-gatherers may have even adopted, culturally adapted metallurgical practices, while still maintaining their ancient stone industrial traditions. Cultural continuity, via stone industries of isolated West African hunter-gatherers from the forest-savanna region, has been found throughout West Africa as late as the end of first millennium CE. In Sopie FkBvl, Liberia, quartz microliths have been dated to 2360 ± 125 BP. Kamabai Shelter, in Sierra Leone, had quartz microliths dated to 1190 ± 95 BP. In Mali, quartz microliths were dated to 1430 ± 80 BP in Nyamanko and dated to 1020 ± 105 BP in Korounkorokale. Kariya Wuro, in Nigeria, had quartz microliths dated to 950 ± 30 BP. After having persisted as late as the end of first millennium CE, 1000 BP, or some period of time after 1500 CE, many of the remaining West African hunter-gatherers were likely ultimately acculturated and admixed into the larger groups of West African agriculturalists, akin to the migratory Bantu-speaking agriculturalists and their encounters with Central African hunter-gatherers.

=== Iron Age ===
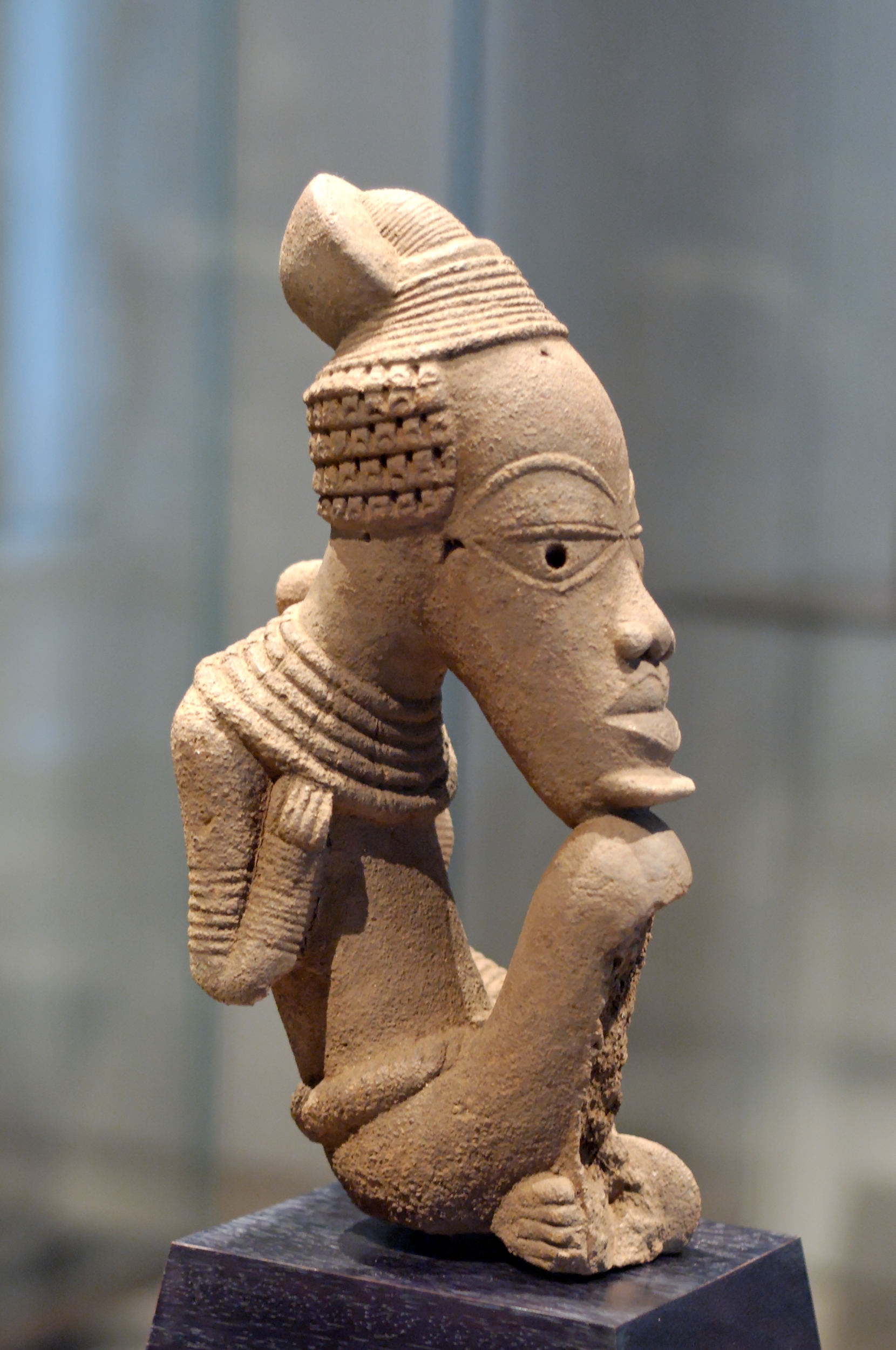
Nok terracotta sculpture

The Tichitt Culture, or Tichitt Tradition, was created by proto-Mande peoples. In 4000 BCE, the start of sophisticated social structure (e.g., trade of cattle as valued assets) developed among herders amid the Pastoral Period of the Sahara. Saharan pastoral culture (e.g., fields of tumuli, lustrous stone rings, axes) was intricate. By 1800 BCE, Saharan pastoral culture expanded throughout the Saharan and Sahelian regions. The initial stages of sophisticated social structure among Saharan herders served as the segue for the development of sophisticated hierarchies found in African settlements, such as Dhar Tichitt. After migrating from the Central Sahara, Mande peoples established their civilization in the Tichitt region of the Western Sahara. The Tichitt Tradition of eastern Mauritania dates from 2200 BCE to 200 BCE. Tichitt culture, at Dhar Néma, Dhar Tagant, Dhar Tichitt, and Dhar Walata, included a four-tiered hierarchical social structure, farming of cereals, metallurgy, numerous funerary tombs, and a rock art tradition. At Dhar Tichitt and Dhar Walata, pearl millet may have also been independently domesticated amid the Neolithic. Dhar Tichitt, which includes Dakhlet el Atrouss, may have served as the primary regional center for the multi-tiered hierarchical social structure of the Tichitt Tradition, and the Malian Lakes Region, which includes Tondidarou, may have served as a second regional center of the Tichitt Tradition. The urban Tichitt Tradition may have been the earliest large-scale, complexly organized society in West Africa, and an early civilization of the Sahara, which may have served as the segue for state formation in West Africa. In the late period of the Tichitt Tradition at Dhar Néma, domesticated pearl millet was used to temper the tuyeres of an oval-shaped low shaft furnace; this furnace was one out of 16 iron furnaces located on elevated ground. Iron metallurgy may have developed before the second half of 1st millennium BCE, as indicated by pottery dated between 800 BCE and 200 BCE. At Dhar Walata and Dhar Tichitt, copper was also used. After its decline in Mauritania, the Tichitt Tradition spread to the Middle Niger region (e.g., Méma, Macina, Dia Shoma, Jenne Jeno) of Mali where it developed into and persisted as Faïta Facies ceramics between 1300 BCE and 400 BCE among rammed earth architecture and iron metallurgy (which had developed after 900 BCE). State-based urbanism in the Middle Niger and the Ghana Empire developed between 450 CE and 700 CE. As part of a broader trend of iron metallurgy developed in the West African Sahel amid 1st millennium BCE, iron items (350 BCE – 100 CE) were found at Dhar Tagant, iron metalworking and/or items (800 BCE – 400 BCE) were found at Dia Shoma and Walaldé, and the iron remnants (760 BCE – 400 BCE) found at Bou Khzama and Djiganyai. The iron materials that were found are evidence of iron metalworking at Dhar Tagant.

The Nok peoples and the Gajiganna peoples may have migrated from the Central Sahara, along with pearl millet and pottery, diverged prior to arriving in the northern region of Nigeria, and thus, settled in their respective locations in the region of Gajiganna and Nok. Nok culture may have emerged in 1500 cal BCE and continued to persist until 1 cal BCE. Nok people may have developed terracotta sculptures, through large-scale economic production, as part of a complex funerary culture that may have included practices such as feasting. The earliest Nok terracotta sculptures may have developed in 900 BCE. Some Nok terracotta sculptures portray figures wielding slingshots, as well as bows and arrows, which may be indicative of Nok people engaging in the hunting, or trapping, of undomesticated animals. A Nok sculpture portrays two individuals, along with their goods, in a dugout canoe. Both of the anthropomorphic figures in the watercraft are paddling. The Nok terracotta depiction of a dugout canoe may indicate that Nok people used dugout canoes to transport cargo, along tributaries (e.g., Gurara River) of the Niger River, and exchanged them in a regional trade network. The Nok terracotta depiction of a figure with a seashell on its head may indicate that the span of these riverine trade routes may have extended to the Atlantic coast. In the maritime history of Africa, there is the earlier Dufuna canoe, which was constructed approximately 8000 years ago in the northern region of Nigeria; as the second earliest form of water vessel known in Sub-Saharan Africa, the Nok terracotta depiction of a dugout canoe was created in the central region of Nigeria during the first millennium BCE. As part of Nok traditional medicine, Nok ceramics may have been used to process roots and bark as medicinal plants for the production of medicinal decoctions. Excluding ancient Egyptian figurative art, Nok sculptures are regarded to be the most early, large figurative art in continental Africa. Latter artistic traditions of West Africa – Bura of Niger (3rd century CE – 10th century CE), Koma of Ghana (7th century CE – 15th century CE), Igbo-Ukwu of Nigeria (9th century CE – 10th century CE), Jenne-Jeno of Mali (11th century CE – 12th century CE), and Ile Ife of Nigeria (11th century CE – 15th century CE) – may have been shaped by the earlier West African clay terracotta tradition of the Nok culture. Mountaintops are where the majority of Nok settlement sites are found. At the settlement site of Kochio, the edge of a cellar of a settlement wall was chiseled from a granite foundation. Additionally, a megalithic stone fence was constructed around the enclosed settlement site of Kochio. Also, a circular stone foundation of a hut was discovered in Puntun Dutse. Iron metallurgy may have been independently developed in the Nok culture between the 9th century BCE and 550 BCE. As each share cultural and artistic similarity with the Nok culture found in Nok, Sokoto, and Katsina, the Niger-Congo-speaking Yoruba, Jukun, or Dakakari peoples may be descendants of the Nok peoples. Based on stylistic similarities with the Nok terracottas, the bronze figurines of the Yoruba Ife Empire and the Bini kingdom of Benin may also be continuations of the traditions of the earlier Nok culture.

Dates are approximate, consult particular article for details
Iron Age

== Historical period ==
In addition to the Syrian Arab and Yemeni Arab upper class, Arab Bedouins, and Berbers from western Algeria and Morocco, Sub-Saharan West Africans from regions such as western Mali, Mauritania, and northern Senegal were part of the amalgamated ethnic group known as the Moors.

Painted rock art from Manding peoples are found largely in Mali, where Malinke and Bambara peoples reside. The Manding rock art, developed using black, white, or red paint, is primarily composed of geometric artforms, as well as animal (e.g., saurian) and human artforms. Some of the Manding rock art may relate to circumcision rituals for initiates. During the 15th century CE, migrations from the northern area of Guinea and southern area of Mali may have resulted in the creation of Manding rock art in the northern area (e.g., Yobri, Nabruk) of Mali, southeastern area (e.g., Takoutala, Sourkoundingueye) of Burkina Faso, and Dogon country.

=== Depopulation due to trade of enslaved Africans ===
During the Trans-Atlantic slave trade, most West African ethnic groups were not active participants (e.g., captors, captives). In response to the Trans-Atlantic slave trade, most West African ethnic groups developed various methods (e.g., defensive, offensive, protective) to protect their families and communities against external factors, such as captivity and depopulation. A common tactic used by European slavers was getting African intermediaries drunk prior to discussions regarding the trade of enslaved Africans. Some African intermediaries were also enslaved after discussions regarding the trade of enslaved Africans were concluded with European slavers. Areas, such as the Birim River Valley with Akan people, were depopulated. A Ghanaian man provided the following recorded account to a European official during the Danish Gold Coast period of Ghana in 1738 CE:

It is you, you whites they say, who have brought all of this evil among us. Would we have sold each other, if you had not come to us as buyers? The desire we have for your enticing goods and brandy has brought distrust between brothers and friends. So, alcohol has been a great enemy of mankind, since time immemorial—yes, even between father and son. From our fathers, we knew in the past that anyone guilty of malpractice, who had committed murder twice, was stoned or drowned. Otherwise, the punishment for ordinary misdeeds was that the culprit should carry to the offended party's hut or house a big log of firewood for two or three consecutive days and beg him for forgiveness on his knees. We used to know thousands of families here and there on the coast in our youth. But now, we can hardly count a hundred individuals. That's depopulation. And the worst part is that you have become a necessary evil among us. For if you were to leave now, the Blacks up-country would allow us to live for a half-of-a-year, and then they would come and kill us, with our wives and children. And they bear this hatred because of you.

Richardson (1994) highlighted the "severity" of the Trans-Atlantic slave trade and the "demographic impact" it had on the "population history of West Africa." Richardson (1994) indicated that the "population of West Africa may have fallen in 1730-1850, [and] that of Western Europe and North America rose substantially, with the result that the African share of the population of the Atlantic basin fell by perhaps two-thirds between 1650 and 1850."

More specifically, between 1501 CE and 1875 CE, the following embarking regions of West Africa are estimated to have at least the following number of enslaved Africans taken captive: 1,999,060 from Bight of Benin, 1,594,560 from Bight of Biafra, 1,209,322 from Gold Coast, 755,513 from Senegambia, 388,770 from Sierra Leone, and 336,867 from Windward Coast, which in total is at least 6,284,092 enslaved Africans estimated to have been taken captive. By contrast, between 1501 CE and 1875 CE, the following other embarking regions of Africa are estimated to have at least the following number of enslaved Africans taken captive: 5,694,575 from western Central Africa and St. Helena as well as 542,668 from Southeast Africa and islands in the Indian Ocean, which in total is at least 6,237,243 enslaved Africans estimated to have been taken captive. Between 1501 CE and 1875 CE, under the banner of the following nations, at least the following number of enslaved Africans were taken captive: 111,040 via Denmark/Baltic, 1,381,404 via France, 3,259,441 via Britain, 554,336 via Netherlands, 5,848,266 via Portugal/Brazil, 1,061,524 via Spain/Uruguay, and 305,326 via the United States of America. Between at least 12% and 13% of enslaved Africans taken captive died during the Middle Passage. Between 1501 CE and 1875 CE, at least the following number of enslaved Africans taken captive were disembarked at the following locations: 178,900 in Africa, 5,532,118 in Brazil (64,062 in an unspecified area of Brazil; 162,701 in Amazonia; 960,475 in Pernambuco; 1,736,308 in Bahia; 2,608,573 in Southeast Brazil), 2,763,411 in the British Caribbean (49,124 in Trinidad/Tobago; 59,473 in Montserrat/Nevis; 65,962 in Saint Vincent; 80,510 in British Guiana; 84,384 in other parts of the British Caribbean; 127,437 in Dominica; 149,478 in Grenada; 160,868 in Saint Kitts; 164,869 in Antigua; 608,957 in Barbados; 1,212,352 in Jamaica), 129,866 in the Danish West Indies, 514,192 in the Dutch Americas (173,203 in the Dutch Caribbean; 340,988 in the Dutch Guianas), 10,797 in Europe, 1,328,423 in the French Caribbean (31,573 in an unspecified area of the French Caribbean; 36,819 in French Guiana; 87,846 in Guadeloupe; 261,043 in Martinique; 911,141 in Saint Domingue), 472,381 in North America (2,176 in an unspecified area of the United States of America; 25,648 in the Gulf states; 33,103 in the northern region of the United States of America; 158,427 in Chesapeake; 253,028 in the Carolinas/Georgia), and 1,591,245 in the Spanish Americas (31,320 in Puerto Rico; 82,990 in Rio de la Plata; 214,888 in other parts of the Spanish Americas; 372,055 in the Spanish Circum-Caribbean; 889,990 in Cuba). The overall number of enslaved Africans estimated to have been taken captive from Africa are at least 12,521,335.

=== Modern era ===
In 1950 CE, the population of West Africa is estimated to have been 69,564,958. In 1960 CE, the population of West Africa is estimated to have been 84,682,838. In 1970 CE, the population of West Africa is estimated to have been 105,658,305. In 1980 CE, the population of West Africa is estimated to have been 137,592,173. In 1990 CE, the population of West Africa is estimated to have been 180,598,738. In 2000 CE, the population of West Africa is estimated to have been 234,198,478. In 2010 CE, the population of West Africa is estimated to have been 308,340,050. In 2020 CE, the population of West Africa is estimated to have been 402,908,941. In 2021 CE, the population of West Africa is estimated to have been 413,340,896.

== Bioanthropological data ==
McFadden (2023) states:

Human remnants can take many forms of evidence, and a vast array of methodologies can be applied to their analysis for the purpose of paleodemographic research. Preserved human remains can be analyzed using ancient DNA and skeletal analyses to build a biological profile for each individual (including their sex, age, stature, evidence of pathology, mobility, and ancestry). Extrapolated to the population level, genetic studies can use a combination of ancient and modern DNA to identify isolation, migration, and population size estimates (Loog, 2021). Biological profile data can be used to evaluate the age-at-death distribution of the population, which provides a number of population insights by proxy, including fertility, birth, maternal mortality, and intrinsic population increase rates (Bocquet-Appel & Masset, 1982; McFadden & Oxenham, 2018a, 2018b, 2019). The frequency or concentration of radiocarbon dates, when radiocarbon represents evidence of human activity, can also be used to evaluate relative fluctuations in human activity and, by proxy, population growth (developed initially by Rick [1987] but with significant advancement since then; e.g., DiNapoli et al., 2021). A range of other techniques, such as ethnographically informed estimates of house capacity applied to preserved settlement structures (e.g., Porčić & Nikolić, 2016), have also been used to estimate population dynamics in the past.

=== Skeletal remains ===
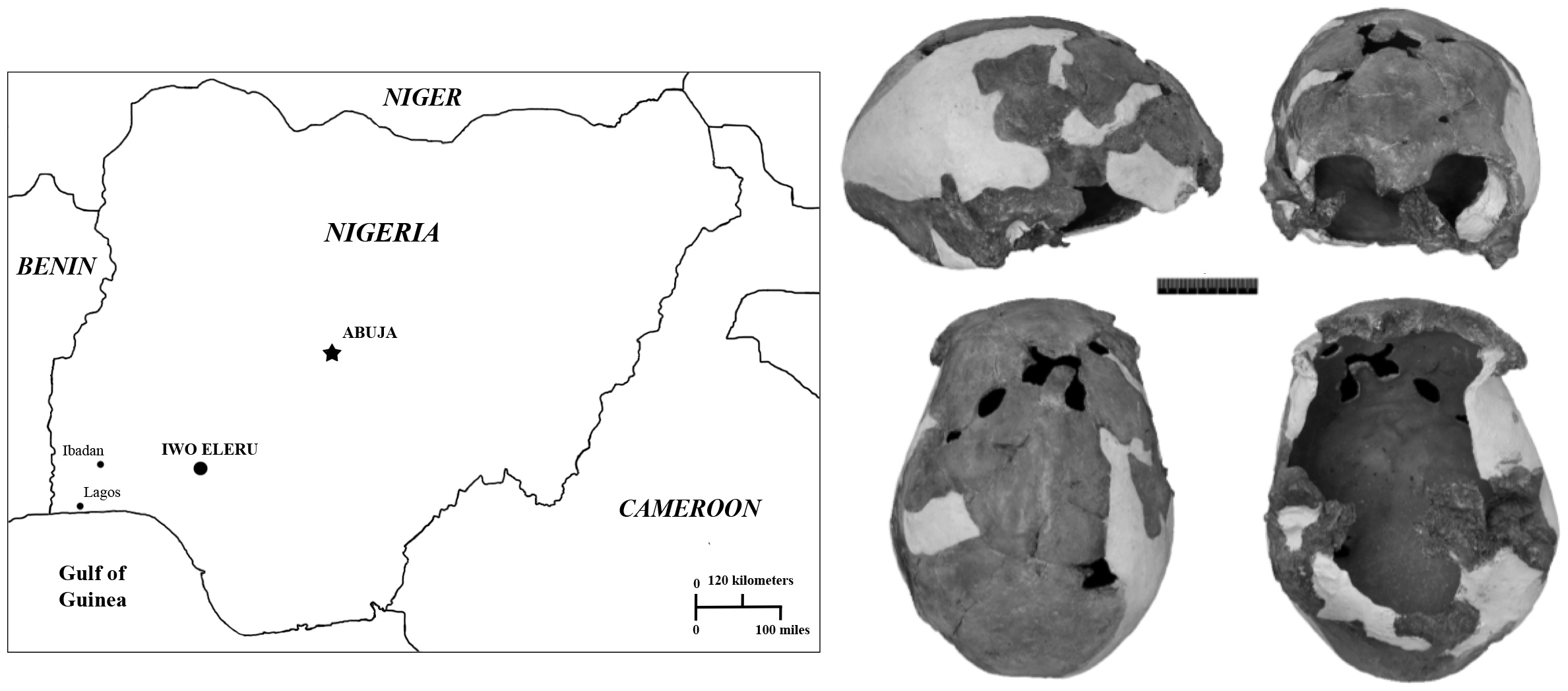
Iwo Eleru site and Iwo Eleru skull

The Iwo Eleru skull, which was found at Iwo Eleru, Nigeria and may be evidence of modern humans possessing possible archaic human admixture or of a late-persisting early modern human, has been dated to 13,000 BP.

In the Acacus region of Libya, at the Uan Muhuggiag rockshelter, there was a child mummy (5405 ± 180 BP) and an adult (7823 ± 95 BP/7550 ± 120 BP). In the Tassili n'Ajjer region of Algeria, at Tin Hanakaten rockshelter, there was a child (7900 ± 120 BP/8771 ± 168 cal BP), with cranial deformations due to disease or artificial cranial deformation that bears a resemblance with ones performed among Neolithic-era Nigerians, as well as another child and three adults (9420 ± 200 BP/10,726 ± 300 cal BP).

Amid the early Holocene Wet Phase, Asselar man may have occupied Asselar, in the Saharan region of northern Mali, near what was likely a lake, between 9500 BP and 7000 BP.

Approximated to the Neolithic, there were "Negroid" skeletal remains found in West Africa. At El Guettara, Mali, there were two "Negroid" individuals found. At Karkarichinkat South, Mali, a "Negroid" skull was found.

Two West African hunter-gatherer remains were found, dated to the early period of the Stone to Metal Age at Shum Laka in 8000 BP, and two other West African hunter-gatherer remains were found, dated to the late period of the Stone to Metal Age at Shum Laka in 3000 BP. The two earlier West African hunter-gatherers from 8000 BP and two later West African hunter-gatherers from 3000 BP show that there was 5000 years of population continuity among West African hunter-gatherers in the region of Shum Laka, Cameroon.

At Ibalaghen, Mali, there was a "Negroid" cranium found, which has been specifically dated between 7000 BP and 4000 BP.

At Tin Lalou, Mali, there was a "Negroid" cranium and mandible found, which have been specifically dated between 7000 BP and 4000 BP.

At Tamaya Mellet, Niger, there were 12 "Negroid" individuals found, which have been specifically dated between 7000 BP and 4000 BP.

Thirteen human remains as well as two female human remains that had undergone incomplete, natural mummification were found at Takarkori rockshelter, Libya, which were dated to the Middle Pastoral Period (6100 BP – 5000 BP). More specifically, with regard to the mummies, one of the naturally mummified females was dated to 6090 ± 60 BP and the other was dated to 5600 ± 70 BP. These two naturally mummified females were the earliest dated mummies to undergo histological inspection.

Between 4500 BP and 4200 BP, human remains from Karkarichinkat North, Mali showed evidence of dental modification, specifically the incisor and canine teeth being made pointed. Among the Sub-Saharan African remains, while the only male Sub-Saharan African remains did not have modified teeth, four young female Sub-Saharan African remains did have modified teeth; these dental modifications may have been markers of group identity, rite of passage, or childbearing.

Two human skeletal remains were found at Dhar Walata, Mauritania. Though one is undated, based on the date of the other human skeletal remains found nearby, it has been dated to 3930 ± 80 BP.

Human skeletal remains found at Bou Khzama in Dhar Néma, Mauritania have been dated to 3690 ± 60 BP.

In the mid-4th millennium BP, four "Negroid" individuals occupied Kintampo, in Ghana.

At Itaakpa rockshelter, Nigeria, human remains (e.g., mandible, maxilla), which are similar to human remains from Shum Laka, Cameroon, and, along with ceramics and African oil palm (Elaeis guineensis), are dated to 2210 ± 80 BP.

Human skeletal remains found at Dhar Néma, Mauritania have been dated to 2095 ± 55 BP.

In 1990 BP, a "Negroid" agriculturalist (indicated via dental evidence from the skeletal remains) occupied Rop rock shelter, in the northern region of Nigeria.

At the Akumbu mound complex, in Mema, Mali, its archaeological findings date between 400 CE and 1400 CE; at the cultural deposit of AK3, which contained three human remains, the dates range between 400 CE and 600 CE. While two out of three human remains were in a fully decomposed state, one of the human remains were able to be determined to be a young adult (17–25 years old) female, who was buried with two copper bracelets – one on each wrist, 13 cowrie shells, 11 stone beads, and a fully intact pot.

The remains of a 25-year-old woman with interproximal grooved dental modifications, which was found in the Sahelian region of Kufan Kanawa, Niger and may have been occupied by Hausa people who later settled in Kano, has been dated to the mid-2nd millennium CE.

=== Osteological indicators ===
The creators of the Round Head rock art possessed dark skin. The dark-skinned ethnic groups, who created the Round Head rock art, differed from Tuareg Berbers. Long-dwelling Tuareg from the same area also recognized the Round Head rock art as a creation of black people who resided in the Tassili region long ago. The dark skin complexion of the hunters who created the Round Head rock art was verified via the testing of skin samples taken from human remains located in the Acacus region of Libya and the Tassili region of Algeria. Based on examination of the Uan Muhuggiag child mummy and Tin Hanakaten child, the results verified that these Central Saharan peoples from the Epipaleolithic, Mesolithic, and Pastoral periods possessed dark skin complexions. Soukopova (2013) thus concludes: "The osteological study showed that the skeletons could be divided into two types, the first Melano-African type with some Mediterranean affinities, the other a robust Negroid type. Black people of different appearance were therefore living in the Tassili and most probably in the whole Central Sahara as early as the 10th millennium BP."

==== Craniometric and dental morphology ====
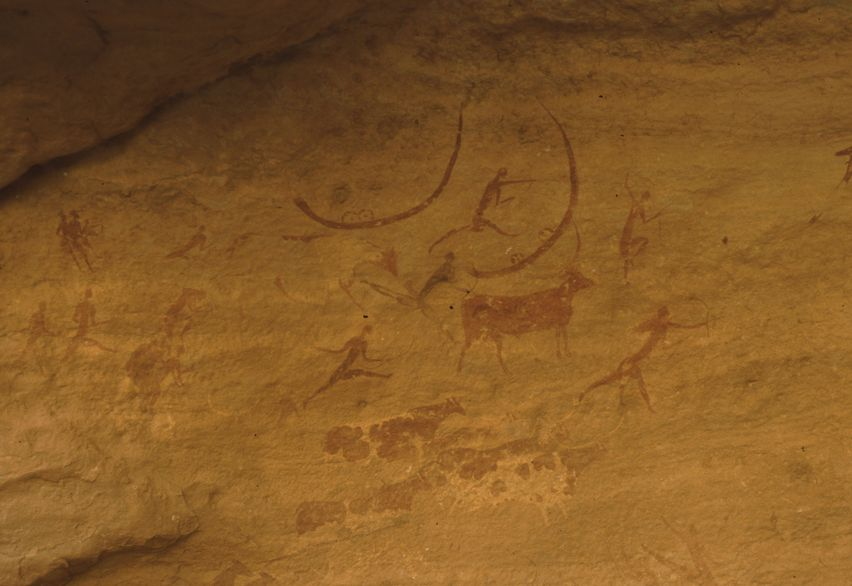
Warrior/Shepherd figures and animals of the Pastoral period

Though the metric study of Ramkrishna Mukherjee et al. (1955) found some close resemblance with the morphology of Nubians from the A-Group culture and northern Egyptians of late era dynasties, the morphology found at Jebel Moya, Sudan was concluded to be closest in resemblance to modern West Africans. The morphological/metric studies of Lloyd Cabot Briggs (1955) and Marie-Claude Chamla (1968) indicate that the morphologies and metric patterns of various types of tropical Africans and southern Egyptians match considerably with their described Neolithic Saharan cranial morphologies and metric patterns. The metric study of N. Petit-Malt and O. Dutour (1987) indicates that Neolithic Saharan cranial metric patterns matched with the metric patterns of early southern Egyptians. The crania of modern West Africans were determined by the morphological/metric study of Jean Hiernaux (1975) to possibly be descendant from these Neolithic Saharan cranial patterns. Compared to the latter crania from Nubia/Kush and earlier Neolithic Saharan crania, crania from the Naqada culture and Badarian culture were placed between these two within a cranial spectrum. S. O. Y. Keita (1993/1995) indicate that these Neolithic Saharan cranial patterns mentioned in the morphological study of Hiernaux (1975) might "include some of the narrow-faced and narrow-nosed "Elongated" groups to which the label "Hamitic" was once applied. He has parsimoniously explained how the "Hamitic" morphology, called by him "Elongated," is indigenous to Africa, and not due to external sources. The natural geographical range of these populations included at least southern Egypt."

The morphological features (e.g., craniometric, dental) of modern West Africans and Nile Valley Africans of the Epipaleolithic were concluded by the dental/craniometric study of Eugen Strouhal (1984) to be close in resemblance to one another. Joel Irish and Christy Turner (1990) compared the dental evidence of Nubians of the Pleistocene era (e.g., Jebel Sahaba), Nubians of the Christian era, and modern West Africans; the mean measure of divergence between modern West Africans and Nubians of the Pleistocene era were found to be 0.04, and Nubians of the Pleistocene and Christian eras were found to be 0.379; consequently, Irish and Turner (1990) concluded that there is "some degree of genetic discontinuity between Pleistocene and Holocene Nubians, with the former being more similar to modern-day West Africans, whereas the latter were more similar to recent North Africans and Europeans." More specifically, the dental studies of Irish and Turner (1990) as well as C. Turner and M. Markowitz (1990) concluded that the earlier peoples of Epipaleolithic/Mesolithic and Neolithic Egypt and Nubia were not predominantly ancestral to the latter agricultural peoples of ancient Egypt and Nubia; rather, instead, concluded that the earlier peoples of Epipaleolithic/Mesolithic and Neolithic Egypt and Nubia underwent nearly complete population replacement, by latter peoples from further north, such as the Near East or Europe, by the time of ancient Egypt and ancient Nubia. Keita (1993) critiqued this shared viewpoint of Irish and Turner (1990) and explained that it "is well known and accepted, rapid evolution can occur. Also, rapid change in northeast Africa might be specifically anticipated because of the possibilities for punctuated microevolution (secondary to severe micro-selection and drift) in the early Holocene Sahara, because of the isolated communities and cyclical climatic changes there, and their possible subsequent human effects." Keita (1993) further explained: "The earliest southern predynastic culture, Badari, owes key elements to post-desiccation Saharan and also perhaps "Nubian" immigration (Hassan 1988). Biologically these people were essentially the same (see above and discussion; Keita 1990). It is also possible that the dental traits could have been introduced from an external source, and increased in frequency primarily because of natural selection, either for the trait or for a growth pattern requiring less energy. There is no evidence for sudden or gradual mass migration of Europeans or Near Easterners into the valley, as the term "replacement" would imply. There is limb ratio and craniofacial morphological and metric continuity in Upper Egypt-Nubia in a broad sense from the late paleolithic through dynastic periods, although change occurred." Keita (1995) later clarified that, while this critique was not a denial of some Near Eastern immigration having occurred, inferring mass migrations from a single data type is problematic, and that the specifics and complexities of in-situ micro-evolutionary changes and adaptations are not allowed by typological thinking. While Thomson and MacIver (1905) noted some population changes as well as population continuity, Keita (1995) further indicates that descriptive and photographic evidence of the human remains from Dynasty I of Badari-Naqada (4400 BCE – 3100 BCE), Jebel Sahaba/Wadi Halfa (12000 BP – 6000 BP), Wadi Kubbaniya (20,000 BP), and Nazlet Khater (30,000 BP), demonstrates a general population continuity.

The dental study of Irish (2016) indicates that West Africans (e.g., Benin, Cameroon, Ghana, Nigeria, Togo) may have originated in the western Saharan region of Gobero, during the Kiffian period, and, due to desertification of the Green Sahara in 7000 cal BCE, pre-proto-Bantu-speaking peoples diverged from West Africans and began to migrate southward into Nigeria and Cameroon. From Nigeria and Cameroon, as agricultural Proto-Bantu-speaking peoples began to migrate, they diverged into East Bantu-speaking peoples (e.g., Democratic Republic of Congo) and West Bantu-speaking peoples (e.g., Congo, Gabon) between 2500 cal BCE and 1200 cal BCE. Irish (2016) also indicates that, in accordance with noted differences from among other West Africans and with oral traditions stating an "origins in the east", Igbo people and Yoruba people may have back-migrated from among Bantu-speaking peoples to their modern locations in Nigeria.

The dental analysis included in the study of Lipson et al. (2020) recognized patterns of wear found on the anterior superior teeth surface of young adult female West African hunter-gatherer remains, dated 3820 cal BP – 3250 cal BP and found at Shum Laka, Cameroon, which is consistent with a diet rich in the consumption of tubers. In addition to these wear patterns being found among agriculturalists, these patterns are found among Central African hunter-gatherers, such as the Bayaka from the Central African Republic.

== Genetics ==
=== Archaic Human DNA ===
Archaic traits found in human fossils of West Africa (e.g., Iho Eleru fossils, which dates to 13,000 BP) and Central Africa (e.g., Ishango fossils, which dates between 25,000 BP and 20,000 BP) may have developed as a result of admixture between archaic humans and modern humans or may be evidence of late-persisting early modern humans. While Denisovan and Neanderthal ancestry in non-Africans outside of Africa are more certain, archaic human ancestry in Africans is less certain and is too early to be established with certainty.

=== Ancient DNA ===
As of 2017, human ancient DNA has not been found in the region of West Africa. As of 2020, human ancient DNA has not been forthcoming in the region of West Africa.

The Taforalts of Morocco, who have been radiocarbon dated between 15,100 cal BP and 13,900 cal BP, and were found to be 63.5% Natufian, were also found to be 36.5% Sub-Saharan African (e.g., Hadza), which is drawn out, most of all, by West Africans (e.g., Yoruba, Mende). In addition to having similarity with the remnant of a more basal Sub-Saharan African lineage (e.g., a basal West African lineage shared between Yoruba and Mende peoples), the Sub-Saharan African DNA in the Taforalt people of the Iberomaurusian culture may be best represented by modern West Africans (e.g., Yoruba).

Ancient DNA was able to be obtained from two West African hunter-gatherers from the early period of the Stone to Metal Age at Shum Laka, in 8000 BP, and two West African hunter-gatherers from the late period of the Stone to Metal Age at Shum Laka, in 3000 BP. The mitochondrial DNA and Y-Chromosome haplogroups found in the ancient Shum Laka foragers were Sub-Saharan African haplogroups. Two earlier Shum Laka foragers were of haplogroup L0a2a1 – broadly distributed throughout modern African populations – and two later Shum Laka foragers were of haplogroup L1c2a1b – distributed among both modern West and Central African agriculturalists and hunter-gatherers. One earlier Shum Laka forager was of haplogroup B and one later Shum Laka forager haplogroup B2b, which, together, as macrohaplogroup B, is distributed among modern Central African hunter-gatherers (e.g., Baka, Bakola, Biaka, Bedzan). The autosomal admixture of the four ancient Shum Laka forager children was ~35% Western Central African hunter-gatherer and ~65% Basal West African – or, an admixture composed of a modern western Central African hunter-gatherer component, a modern West African component, existing locally before 8000 BP, and a modern East African/West African component likely from further north in the regions of the Sahel and Sahara. The two earlier Shum Laka foragers from 8000 BP and two later Shum Laka foragers from 3000 BP show 5000 years of population continuity in region. Yet, modern peoples of Cameroon are more closely related to modern West Africans than to the ancient Shum Laka foragers. Modern Cameroonian hunter-gatherers, while partly descended, are not largely descended from the Shum Laka foragers, due to the apparent absence of descent from Basal West Africans. The Bantu expansion is hypothesized to have originated in a homeland of Bantu-speaking peoples located around western Cameroon, a part of which Shum Laka is viewed as being of importance in the early period of this expansion. By 3000 BP, the Bantu expansion is hypothesized to have already begun. Yet, the sampled ancient Shum Laka foragers – two from 8000 BP and two from 3000 BP – show that most modern Niger-Congo speakers are greatly distinct from the ancient Shum Laka foragers, thus, showing that the ancient Shum Laka foragers were not the ancestral source population for modern Bantu-speaking peoples. While Southern African hunter-gatherers are generally recognized as being the earliest divergent modern human group, having diverged from other groups around 250,000 BP – 200,000 BP, as a result of the sampling of the ancient Shum Laka foragers, Central African hunter-gatherers are shown to have likely diverged at a similar time, if not even earlier.

Two naturally mummified women from the Middle Pastoral Period of the Central Sahara carried basal haplogroup N.

=== Y-Chromosomal DNA ===
Eight male individuals from Guinea Bissau, two male individuals from Niger, one male individual from Mali, and one male individual from Cabo Verde carried haplogroup A1a.

As a result of haplogroup D0, a basal branch of haplogroup DE, being found in three Nigerian men, it may be the case that haplogroup DE, as well as its sublineages D0 and E, originated in Africa.

As of 19,000 years ago, Africans, bearing haplogroup E1b1a-V38, likely traversed across the Sahara, from east to west. E1b1a1-M2 likely originated in West Africa or Central Africa.

=== Mitochondrial DNA ===
Around 18,000 BP, Mende people, along with Gambian peoples, grew in population size.

In 15,000 BP, Niger-Congo speakers may have migrated from the Sahelian region of West Africa, along the Senegal River, and introduced L2a1 into North Africa, resulting in modern Mauritanian peoples and Berbers of Tunisia inheriting it.

Between 11,000 BP and 10,000 BP, Yoruba people and Esan people grew in population size.

As early as 11,000 years ago, Sub-Saharan West Africans, bearing macrohaplogroup L (e.g., L1b1a11, L1b1a6a, L1b1a8, L1b1a9a1, L2a1k, L3d1b1a), may have migrated through North Africa and into Europe, mostly into southern Europe (e.g., Iberia).

=== Autosomal DNA ===
During the early period of the Holocene, in 9000 BP, Khoisan-related peoples admixed with the ancestors of the Igbo people, possibly in the western Sahara.

Between 2000 BP and 1500 BP, Nilo-Saharan-speakers may have migrated across the Sahel, from East Africa into West Africa, and admixed with Niger-Congo-speaking Berom people. In 710 CE, West African-related populations (e.g., Niger-Congo-speaking Berom people, Bantu-speakers) and East African-related populations (Nilo-Saharan-speaking Ethiopians, Nilo-Saharan-speaking Chadians) admixed with one another in northern Nigeria and northern Cameroon.

=== Medical DNA ===
==== Pediculus ====
During the Copper Age and early Islamic era of ancient Israel, West Africans may have migrated into ancient Israel and introduced head louse from West Africa.

==== Sickle Cell ====
Amid the Green Sahara, the mutation for sickle cell originated in the Sahara or in the northwest forest region of western Central Africa (e.g., Cameroon) by at least 7,300 years ago, though possibly as early as 22,000 years ago. The ancestral sickle cell haplotype to modern haplotypes (e.g., Cameroon/Central African Republic and Benin/Senegal haplotypes) may have first arose in the ancestors of modern West Africans, bearing haplogroups E1b1a1-L485 and E1b1a1-U175 or their ancestral haplogroup E1b1a1-M4732. West Africans (e.g., Yoruba and Esan of Nigeria), bearing the Benin sickle cell haplotype, may have migrated through the northeastern region of Africa into the western region of Arabia. West Africans (e.g., Mende of Sierra Leone), bearing the Senegal sickle cell haplotype, may have migrated into Mauritania (77% modern rate of occurrence) and Senegal (100%); they may also have migrated across the Sahara, into North Africa, and from North Africa, into Southern Europe, Turkey, and a region near northern Iraq and southern Turkey.Some may have migrated into and introduced the Senegal and Benin sickle cell haplotypes into Basra, Iraq, where both occur equally. West Africans, bearing the Benin sickle cell haplotype, may have migrated into the northern region of Iraq (69.5%), Jordan (80%), Lebanon (73%), Oman (52.1%), and Egypt (80.8%).

==== Schistosomes ====
According to Steverding (2020), while not definite: Near the African Great Lakes, schistosomes (e.g., S. mansoni, S. haematobium) underwent evolution. Subsequently, there was an expansion alongside the Nile. From Egypt, the presence of schistosomes may have expanded, via migratory Yoruba people, into Western Africa. Thereafter, schistosomes may have expanded, via migratory Bantu-speaking peoples, into the rest of Sub-Saharan Africa (e.g., Southern Africa, Central Africa).

==== Thalassemia ====
Through pathways taken by caravans, or via travel amid the Almovarid period, a population (e.g., Sub-Saharan West Africans) may have introduced the −29 (A → G) β-thalassemia mutation (found in notable amounts among African Americans) into the North African region of Morocco.

=== Domesticated Animal DNA ===
Niger-Congo migration may have been from Kordofan, Sudan into West Africa or West Africa into Kordofan. Possibly from Kordofan, Niger-Congo speakers accompanied by undomesticated helmeted guineafowls, may have traversed into West Africa, domesticated the helmeted guineafowls by 3000 BCE, and via the Bantu expansion, traversed into other parts of Sub-Saharan Africa (e.g., Central Africa, East Africa, Southern Africa).

== Languages ==
West African hunter-gatherers dwelled in western Central Africa earlier than 32,000 BP and dwelled in West Africa between 16,000 BP and 12,000 BP until as late as 1000 BP or some period of time after 1500 CE. West African hunter-gatherers may have spoken a set of presently extinct Sub-Saharan West African languages. In the northeastern region of Nigeria, Jalaa, a language isolate, may have been a descendant language from the original set(s) of languages spoken by West African hunter-gatherers.

According to MacDonald (2003), the regional birthplace of Nilo-Saharan speakers and Niger-Congo speakers spanned from the Nile Valley to the Maghreb, and the Late Pleistocene "Proto-Niger-Saharan speakers may be represented by the post-Aterian, Mechtoid refuge populations of the North African littoral and highlands (c. 20,000 BP)." Between 12,000 BP and 10,000 BP, amid the Holocene, Niger-Saharan speakers migrated southward into the Sahara and linguistic divergence began to increase; subsequently, they gradually encountered, assimilated, and absorbed West African populations that persisted along coastal West Africa. Libyco-Berber epigraphy, while possibly being composed in playfulness, as a form of code, or as an unknown language unrelated to modern Berber languages, may have also been composed in a Nilo-Saharan language.

Old North African speakers, who have been misidentified as Paleoberbers and did not speak a language(s) that is linguistically related to existing Berber languages, were foragers of prehistoric North Africa that spoke a presently extinct set(s) of languages. While possibly being Nilo-Saharan languages, the Nemadi and Dawada languages may also be descendant languages of the Old North African languages.

Between 10,000 BP and 6000 BP, Proto-Chadic speakers are presumed to have arrived and resided near Mega Lake Chad, located in the ridge region of Bama, Nigeria, Bongor, Chad, Limani, Cameroon, and Maiduguri, Nigeria.

Though possibly developed as early as 5000 BCE, Nsibidi may have also developed in 2000 BCE, as evidenced by depictions of the West African script on Ikom monoliths at Ikom, in Nigeria.

As late as the 6th century CE, Berber-speaking Tuaregs are presumed to have migrated into the southern region of the Central Sahara (e.g., Algeria, Libya, Niger).

Following the spread of Islam and Arabic in West Africa, the Ajami script developed for use among the following languages in West Africa: Bambara, Dagbani, Dyula, Fulfulde, Gbanyito, Hausa, Kanembu, Kanuri, Kotokoli, Mamprusi, Mandinka, Mogofin, Nupe, Songhai, Soninke, Susu, Tamasheq, Wolof, Yoruba, Zarma, and Zenaga. Some of the Timbuktu manuscripts were composed using the Ajami script.

=== Niger-Congo languages ===
Map of the Niger-Congo language phylum

In 10,000 BP, the Proto-Niger-Congo language, or the Niger-Congo languages, are presumed to have their origin and development in West Africa (e.g., Inner Niger Delta), or in the southern region of the Central Sahara. Blench (1999) proposed the following development from Proto-Niger-Congo: Kordofanian is presumed to have diverged from Proto-Niger-Congo, which then developed into Proto-Mande-Atlantic-Congo. Atlantic and Mande are presumed to have diverged from Proto-Mande-Atlantic-Congo, which then developed into Proto-Ijo-Congo. Ijoid is presumed to have diverged from Proto-Ijo-Congo, which then became Proto-Dogon-Congo. Ijoid is presumed to have diverged into Ijo and Defaku. Dogon is presumed to have diverged from Proto-Dogon-Congo, which then became Proto-Volta-Congo. Proto-Volta-Congo is presumed to have diverged into West Volta-Congo and East Volta Congo-Proto-Benue-Kwa. Kru as well as Pre and Gur-Adamawa is presumed to have diverged from West Volta-Congo. Senufo is presumed to have diverged from Gur-Adamawa, which then developed into Ba, Kam, Fali, Ubangian, Peripheral and Central Gur, and a three different groups of Adamawa. East Volta Congo-Proto-Benue-Kwa is presumed to have diverged into Kwa, West Benue-Congo, and East Benue-Congo. Central Nigerian is presumed to have diverged from East Benue-Congo, which then became Bantoid Cross. Cross River is presumed to have diverged from Bantoid Cross, which then became Bantoid. In 5000 BP, the Bantu languages are presumed to eventually have their origin and development in the grassfields of Nigeria and Cameroon, and subsequently, via the Bantu expansion, spread out to various locations throughout Sub-Saharan Africa (e.g., Somalia in East Africa, South Africa in Southern Africa).

Building on the previous work of Diedrich Hermann Westermann, Greenberg (1963) proposed West Atlantic, Mande, Gur, Kwa, Benue-Congo, and Adamawa-Eastern to be sub-groups of a hypothetical language phylum known as Niger-Congo, and along with the Kordofanian languages as a sub-group, a hypothetical language phylum known as Niger-Kordofanian.

Pozdniakov (2012) stated: "The hypothesis of kinship between Niger-Congo languages didn't appear as a result of discovery of numerous related forms, for example, in Mande and Adamawa. It appeared as a result of comparison between the Bantu languages, for which the classical comparative method was possible to be applied and which were reliably reconstructed, with other African languages. Niger-Congo does not exist without Bantu. We need to say clearly that if we establish a genetic relationship between a form in Bantu and in Atlantic languages, or between Bantu and Mande, we have all grounds to trace this form back to Niger-Congo. If we establish such a relationship between Mel and Kru or between Mande and Dogon, we don't have enough reason to claim it Niger-Congo. In other words, all Niger-Congo languages are equal, but Bantu languages are "more equal" than the others."

Babaev (2013) stated: "The truth here is that almost no attempts in fact have been made to verify Greenberg's Niger-Congo hypothesis. This might seem strange but the path laid by Joseph Greenberg to Proto-Niger-Congo was not followed by much research. Most scholars have focused on individual families or groups, and classifications as well as reconstructions were made on lower levels. Compared with the volume of literature on Atlantic or Mande languages, the list of papers considering the aspects of Niger-Congo reconstruction per se is quite scarce."

Dimmendaal and Storch (2016) has indicated that the continuing reassessment of Niger-Congo's "internal structure is due largely to the preliminary nature of Greenberg's classification, explicitly based as it was on a methodology that doesn't produce proofs for genetic affiliations between languages but rather aims at identifying "likely candidates."…The ongoing descriptive and documentary work on individual languages and their varieties, greatly expanding our knowledge on formerly little-known linguistic regions, is helping to identify clusters and units that allow for the application of the historical-comparative method. Only the reconstruction of lower-level units, instead of "big picture" contributions based on mass comparison, can help to verify (or disprove) our present concept of Niger-Congo as a genetic grouping consisting of Benue-Congo plus Volta-Niger, Kwa, Adamawa plus Gur, Kru, the so-called Kordofanian languages, and probably the language groups traditionally classified as Atlantic."

Dimmendaal, Crevels, and Muysken (2020) stated: "Greenberg's hypothesis of Niger-Congo phylum has sometimes been taken as an established fact rather than a hypothesis awaiting further proof, but there have also been attempts to look at his argumentation in more detail. Much of the discussion concerning Niger-Congo after Greenberg's seminal contribution in fact centered around the inclusion or exclusion of specific languages or language groups."

Good (2020) stated: "First proposed by Greenberg (1949), Niger-Congo (NC) has for decades been treated as one of the four major phyla of African languages. The term, as presently used, however, is not without its difficulties. On the one hand, it is employed as a referential label for a group of over 1,500 languages, putting it among the largest commonly cited language groups in the world. On the other hand, the term is also intended to embody a hypothesis of genealogical relationship between the referential NC languages that has not been proven."

==== African language classifications and population history ====
Africanists have used Joseph Greenberg's linguistic classifications as the primary means of comparing, contrasting, classifying, and distinguishing African cultures and peoples from one another. With regard to population history, Güldemann (2018) highlighted the negative impact of "premature synthetic classification for Africa":

The reliance on Greenberg-like genealogical language classifications in Africa has had and still has important negative repercussions outside linguistics, especially in the disciplines concerned with human history like archaeology, genetics, etc. Flight (1981: 52) once wrote: "From a different point of view – for historians and prehistorians – the significance of Greenberg's classification is no less obvious. The historical implications are immediate. A genetic classification of African languages is an outline plan for African history." It comes as no surprise that broad strokes of early African population history, for example, by Heine (1979), MacDonald (1998), Ehret (1998, 2002), Blench (1999b, 2006a), etc. rely to a considerable extent on Greenberg's classification, arguably misguiding basic assumptions about the history of Africa and its peoples. An inspection of the literature makes clear that such a perception of Africa is even influential on the global level. To mention just an extreme example, Manning (2006: 139–141) speculates about the origin of most tropical language families in the Old World by practically deriving them from the equivocal Nilo-Saharan grouping in Africa.

== See also ==
- Population and housing censuses by country
