= Tadrart Rouge =

Mountain range in southeastern Algeria

- تادرارت الحمراء
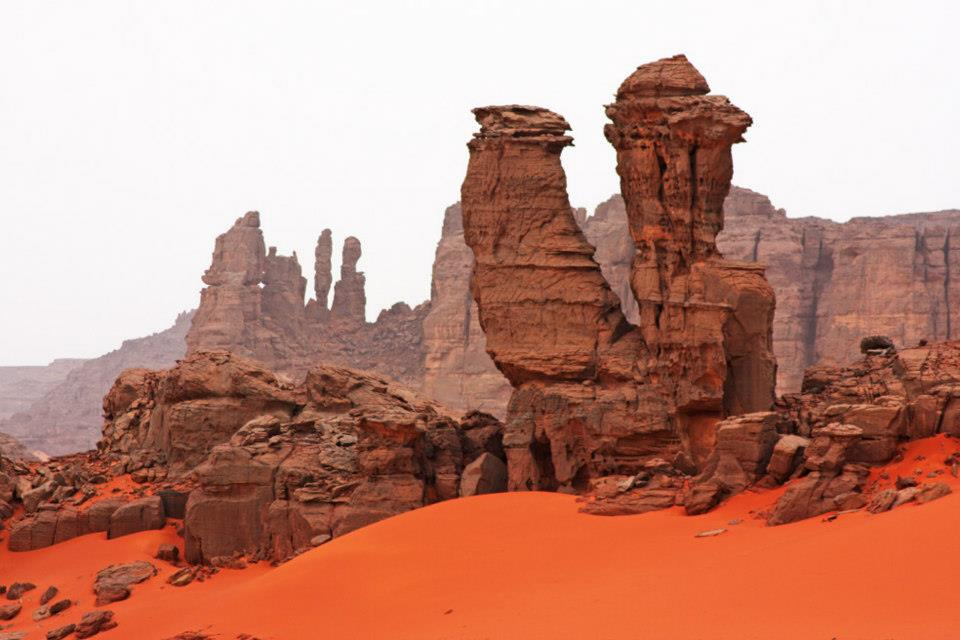
- View of the Tadrart Rouge near Djanet

Highest point
- Elevation: 1,398 m (4,587 ft)
- Coordinates: 23°40′17″N 10°53′26″E

Geography
- Location within Algeria
- Location: SE Algeria
- Parent range: Tassili n'Ajjer

The Tadrart Rouge (meaning "Red Mountain") or Southern Tadrart or Algerian Tadrart or Meridional Tadrart is a mountain range in southeastern Algeria, part of the Algerian Desert. The area has a rich array of rock art.

== Geography ==
The Tadrart Rouge is a roughly 15–30 km large and 150 km long southern prolongation of the Libyan Tadrart Acacus into Algeria spanning to the frontier of Niger. Primarily composed of sandstone, it links the Tassili n’Ajjer in the north-west to the Djado in the southeast. The range is broken by a series of west-east oriented fossil drainage networks resulting in deep gorges. In Djaren, discharging into the erg of Tin Merzuga, is the most important one. The range reaches its maximum elevation of 1,340 m (4,400 ft) towards its southern end about 160 km southeast of Djanet.

Erosion has formed a large number of natural arches. The area is well known for the spectacular red-orange sand dune fields contrasting with the jagged dark red rock formations of the range.

Landscape of the Tadrart Rouge

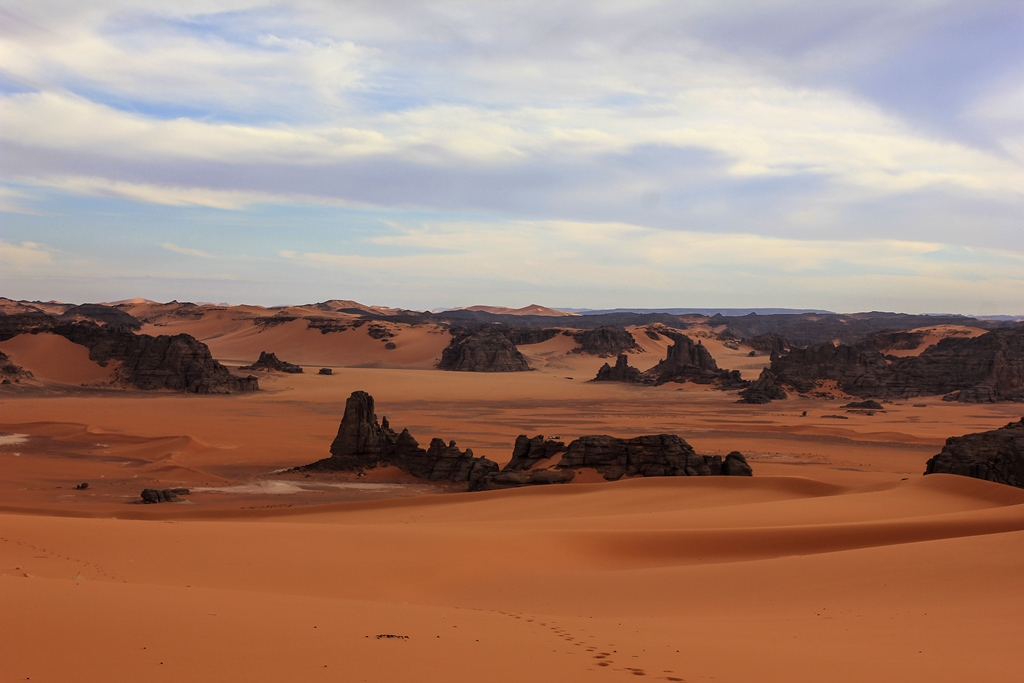
Eastern slopes with its characteristic sand dunes

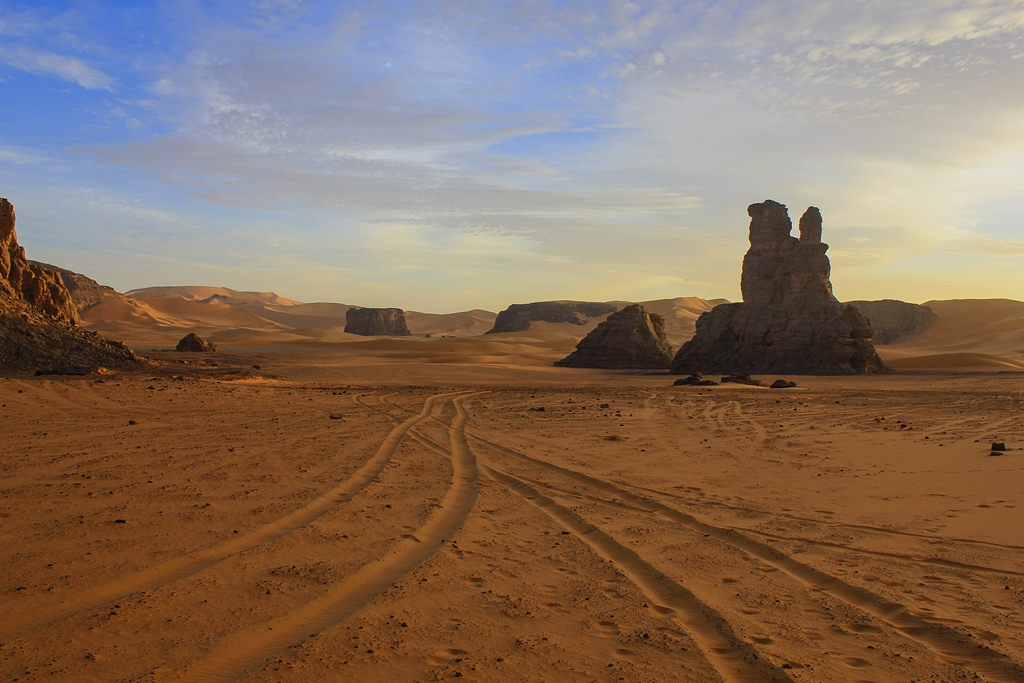
Moul n'Aga

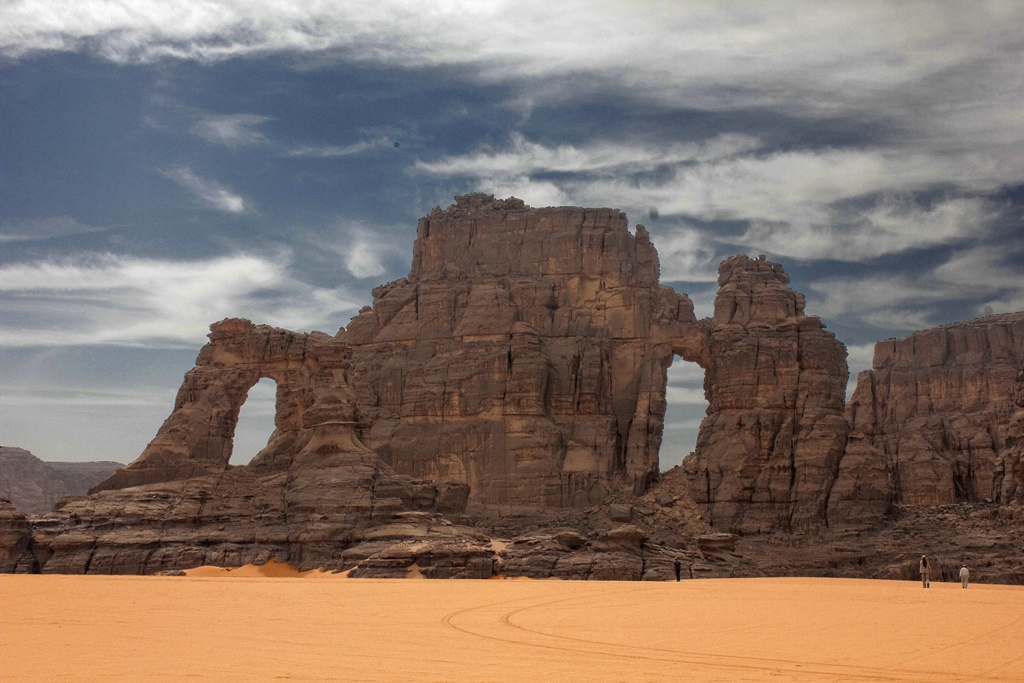
Natural windows in the rock formation of La Cathedrale

== Palaeoclimate ==
The Tadrart Rouge is today harsh and dry with almost no precipitation. But during the African humid period the area had rainfall and was covered by savanna vegetation and thus was suitable for human and animal life.

== Rock art ==
The Tadrart Rouge has magnificent Saharan rock art covering a long chronological span from early Neolithic to recent times. Rock walls and rock shelters on wadi bottoms are dotted with both rock paintings and rock engravings, documenting climate change as the area evolved from a savanna 10,000 years ago to a desert 5,000 years ago. The rock art changed in time from wild fauna such as elephants, rhinos, giraffes, antelopes, and wild bovids, to domesticated animals such as bovids, ovicaprids, horses, and camels.

Rock-Art of the Tadrart Rouge

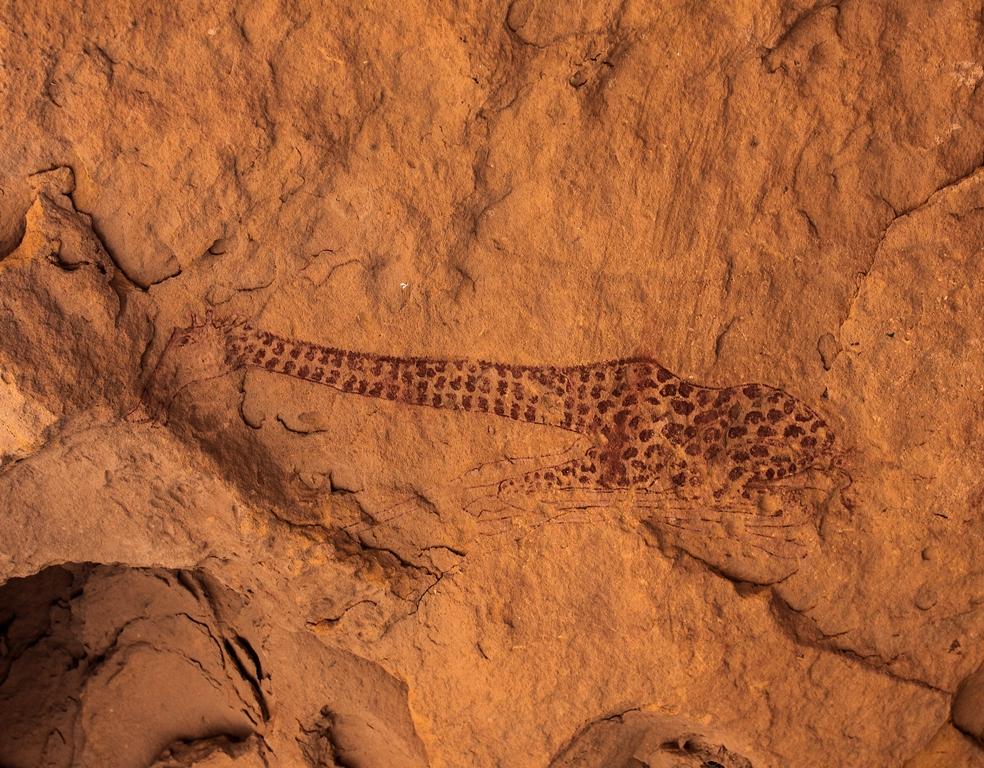
Giraffe with a squared pattern in red patches

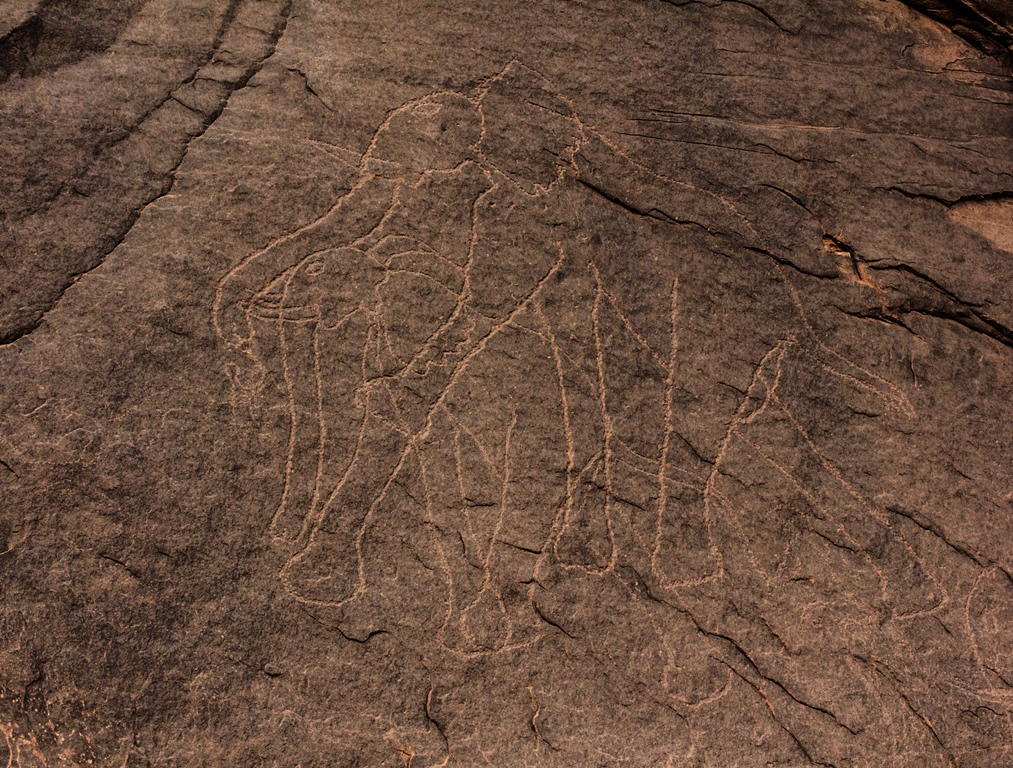
A herd of elephants

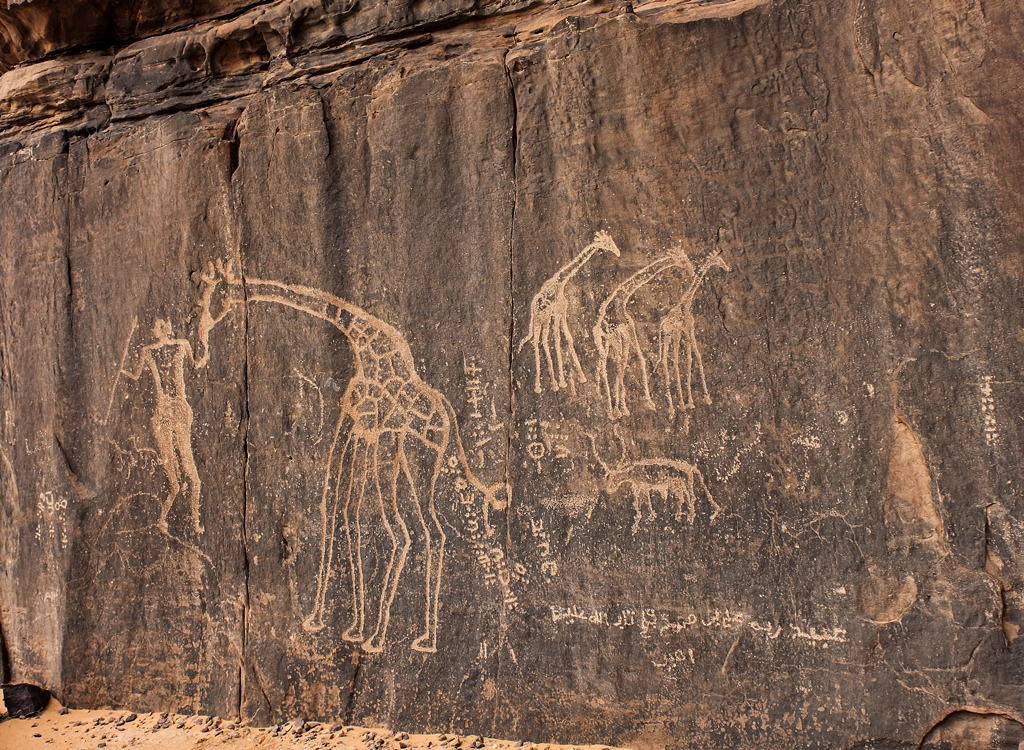
Hunter with giraffes; tifinagh and Arabic inscriptions

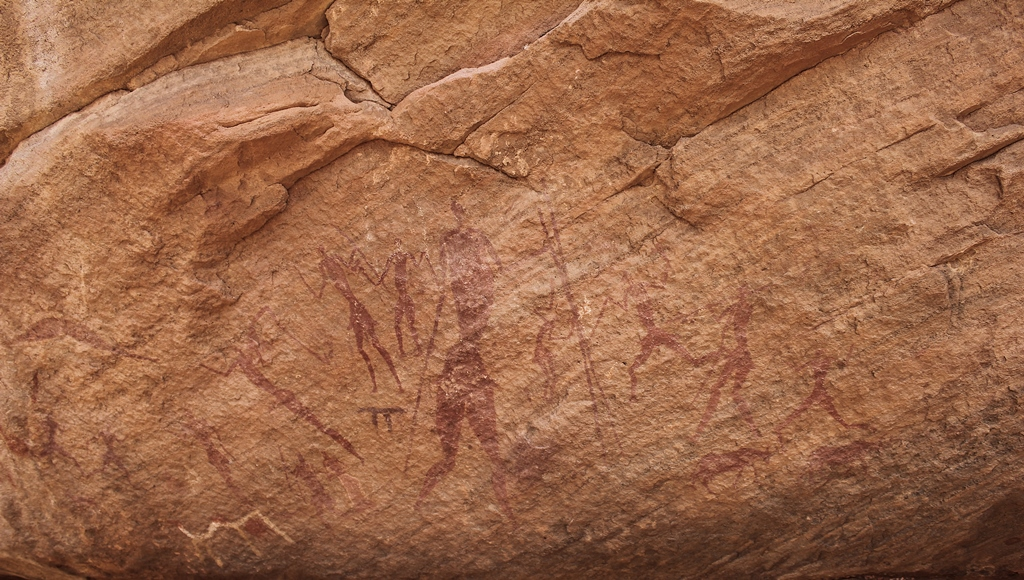
Men with sticks

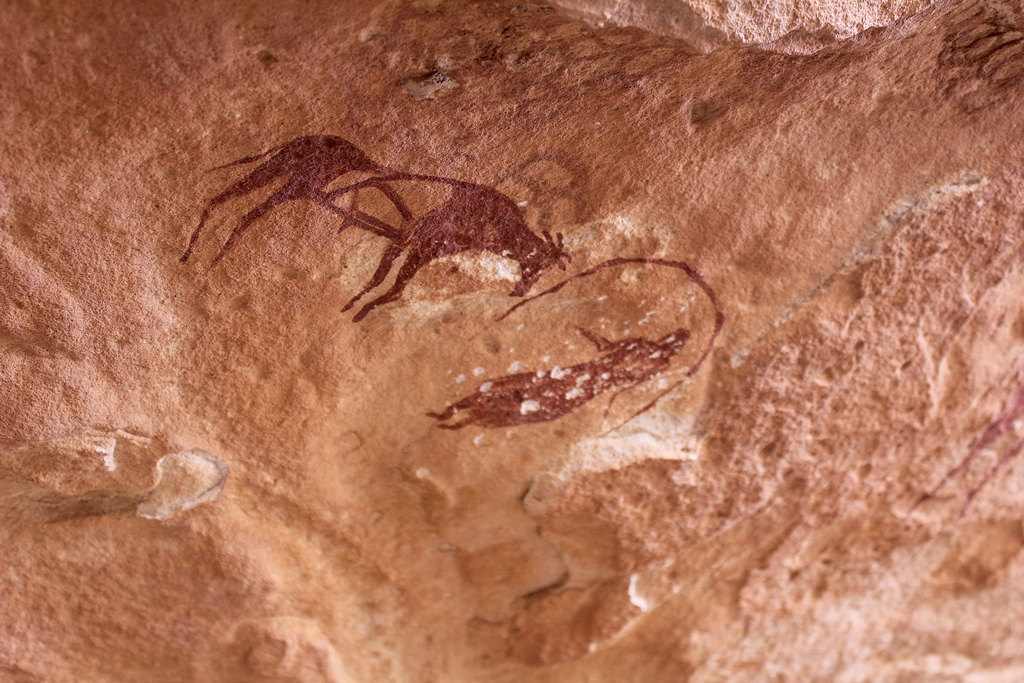
Cattle with woman

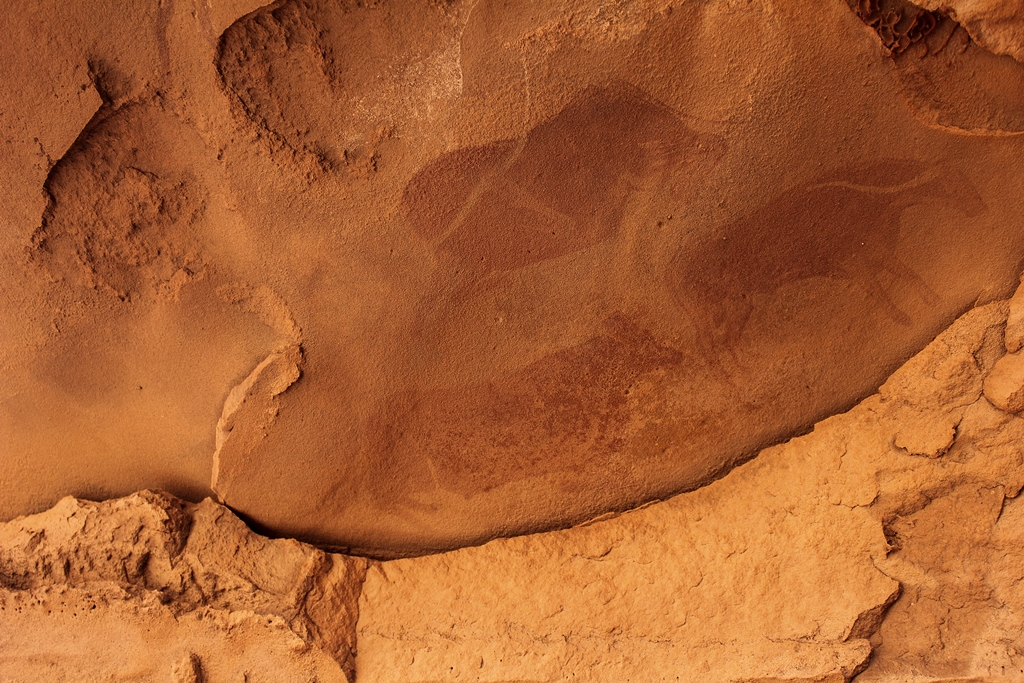
Wild fauna

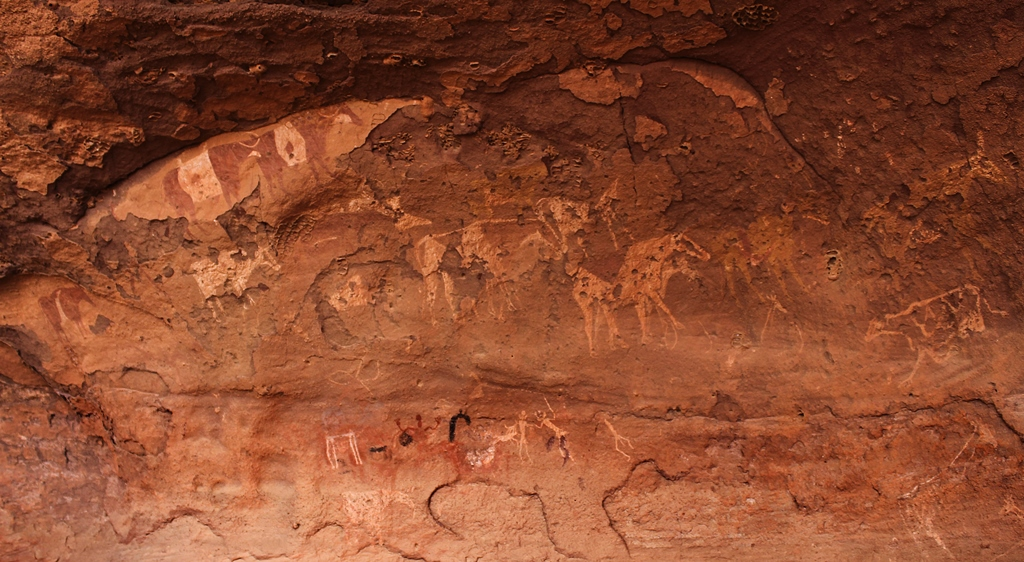
Cattle and pastoral scenes

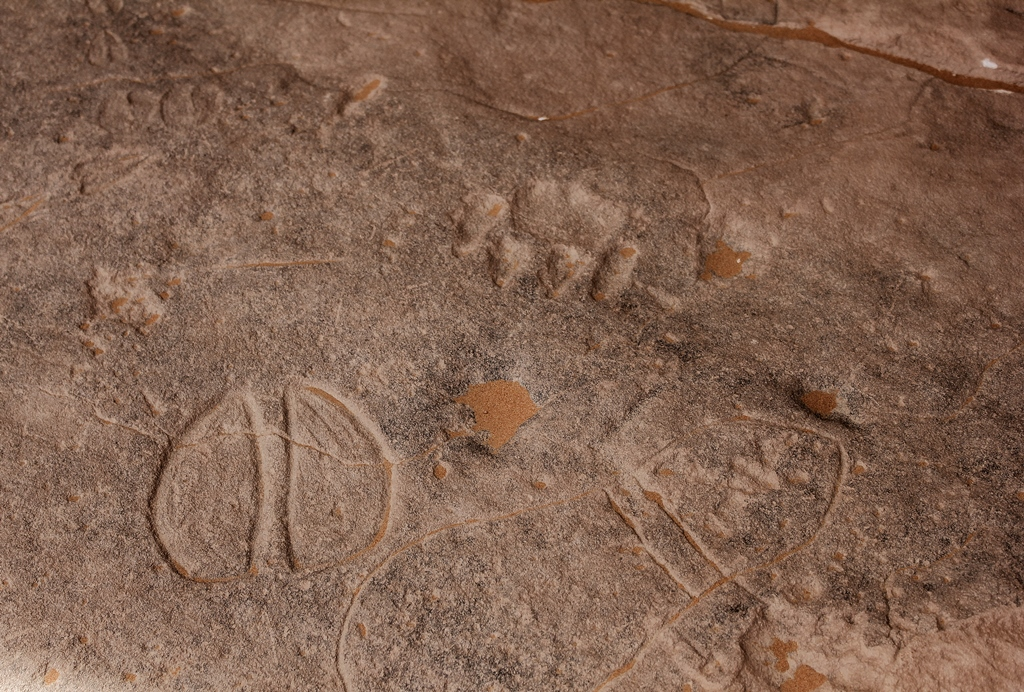
Animal footprints

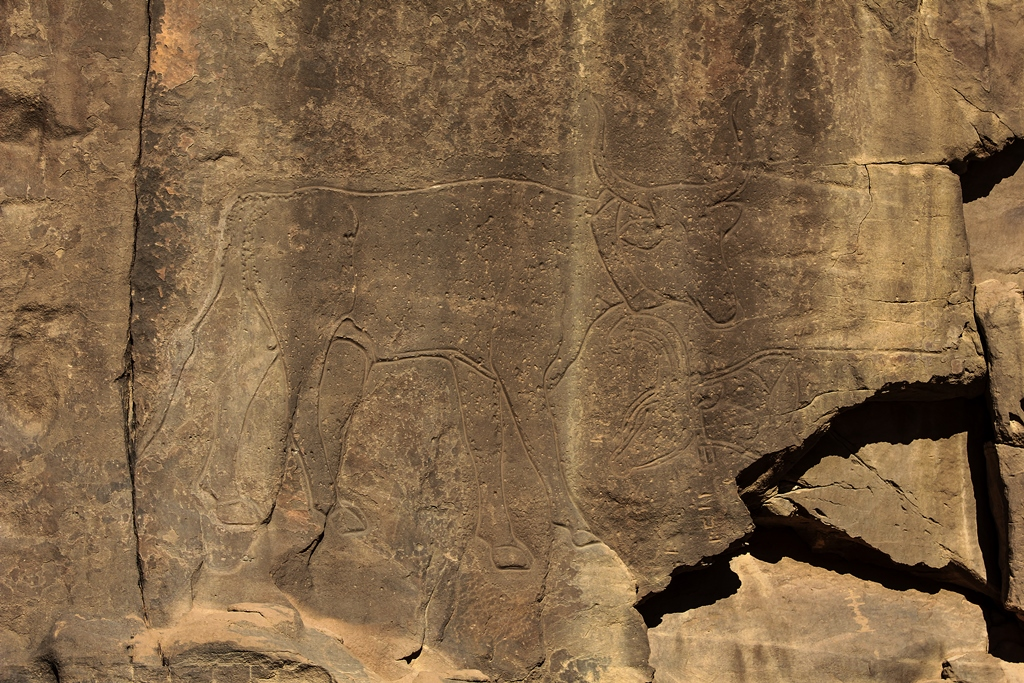
Cattle
