= Complex society =

Concept in anthropology

A complex society is characterized by the following modern features:

- Organizational society wherein its economy is structured according to specialization and a division of labor. These economic features spawn a bureaucratic class and often lead to inequality. Leading to the rise of a ruling elite.
- Archaeologically, features such as big architectural projects such as temples, palaces, public works etc and prescribed burial rites.
- Large scale agricultural development, leads to surplus food, which allows members of the society the time for developing and practicing specialized skill sets, other than farming.
- Organized political structure and state institutions.

The term is mostly used as shorthand to indicate a society with intricate political organization and using technology to expand economic production.

== Emergence of complex societies ==
Before human beings developed complex societies, they lived in primitive societies. The historical consensus is that complex societies emerged from primitive societies around 4000-2000 BCE in Egypt, Mesopotamia, the Indus Valley and China. According to traditional theories of how states emerged, the initial spark for the development of complex societies was an agricultural surplus. This economic specialization leads to divisions of labor. The economic transition from an agricultural economy to a division of labor is the most basic explanation of how societies go from primitive to complex.

Before the rise of complex societies, there was little need for a strong, centralized state government. The increase in populations in these societies meant that the society was too big to rely on interpersonal and informal connections to resolve disputes. This meant there was a need for a hierarchical authority to be acknowledged as the final arbiter in such scenarios. This judicial authority was also able to claim military, economic and religious authority. Often, a claim to one realm was enough to support political ambitions in other realms. This hierarchical decision-making structure became the state, which distinguishes primitive from complex societies.

The evolution of complex societies can be attributed to several factors. The prevalent theory which explains the start of complex societies is the pressure exuded by warfare or a method to organize a population of approximately more than 150. Warfare contributes to establishing complex societies by creating pressure for comprehension between groups which strengthens the cooperation in groups, it improves the organization of the groups structure, and pushes the desire to grow the population of the group. The growth of population results in the loss of person to person interaction which creates a need for a system to keep track the interaction between the leads of the group. The groups would then create symbols of either language, clothing or ideology to identify who belongs to the group and their position in the society. The process of identifying who resides in the groups also expands to identifying the power structure of the group. The identification of the power structure within the group is commonly distributed as a hierarchical power structure meaning groups are organized with one head of the group overseeing the whole group. The group will eventually grow to a state in which labor is divided within specializations meaning that there are branches in the society that are in charge in military affairs, laws, or religion of said society, the elites of the society occupied the leading positions in the branches.

== Linear development of traditional complex civilizations ==
These represent the four conventional stages of how civilizations are usually understood to form.

=== Mobile hunter-gatherer (bands) ===
Hunter-gatherer culture developed in the early prehistoric era. Evidence traces them as far back as 2 million years ago. As primarily nomadic groups, they valued the idea of kinship; moreover, these kinship-focused groups recognized status via age as they viewed their elders as the wise ones from the group. Consequently, they discovered the use of fire and developed intricate lithic tools for hunting. These early humans showcase the early beginnings of both social and biological evolution ideals. They were egalitarian by nature, hunting enough food and shelter, while the division of labor was predominantly gender-based with the advancement of hunting. Additionally, the domestication of animals and plants sparked the Neolithic Revolution. The transition was slow-forth as more developed societies began to develop more effective agricultural methods to meet their needs. This complexity fueled growth in the early civilization of Mesopotamia and other early civilizations.

=== Sedentary societies (tribes) ===
Sedentary societies, more commonly known as tribes, are rarely more than a few thousand individuals who are settlers. They've adapted agricultural innovation, by focusing on horticulture and the domestication of plants & animals. As they derived Neolithic roots of being kinship-focused and respecting their elders and the knowledge they have due to their age. As early Mesopotamia was developing, the Ubaid culture started off as one of the first sedentary villages. Before expanding into a fully developed empire, the Ubaid culture had the domestication of animals and plants such as: wheat, barley, lentils, sheep, goats, and cattle. Additionally, they developed an irrigation system to better serve their agricultural needs, which was further developed on a larger scale in civilizations and expanded beyond agricultural purposes.

=== Chiefdoms ===
Chiefdoms are stratified societies that characteristically have a two-tier settlement pattern, with a central town for administrative and religious duties surrounded by satellite farming villages. They are distinguished from tribes by hereditary inequality between those born into the chiefly class and those born as commoners. The chief and his or her relatives are also often considered divine. Chiefdoms may arise out of necessity under external threat. Villages might join under a leader who is believed to deliver followers from harm, and in the process, the leader may become deified. Once a chiefdom is formed, adjacent communities have few choices except to join the chiefdom, leave the region, or form a rival chiefdom.

=== States ===
States are stratified societies that are more complex than chiefdoms. States often have a three-tier settlement pattern consisting of cities, towns and farming villages. Cities are surrounded by towns that are headed by minor administrators who interact on behalf of the elites with the neighboring villages. Writing first developed in states as a way to organize tax collection, public work and military service.

== Factors ==
So there are four core components that enabled the creation and development of an organized power structure. The concept of a complex society and modern state was born from a need for cohesive organization and for protection from external threats. The emergence of a civilized or complex society is derived from agricultural developments, necessary division of labor, a hierarchical political structure, and the development of institutions as tools for control. Collectively, they create the conditions for a society of complex nature where a new kind of relationship between people emerges. The relationship that emerges is a dependency between one group providing wealth and food and the other who governs and provides protection.

=== Agricultural development ===
The transition from agrarian, nomadic individuals to industrial and sedentary habits emerged from the improvements made in agricultural and central food planning. Early sedentary societies have been argued to emerge as early as 1600 BCE along southern Mexico, as there is a correlation between domesticated plant production, sedentism and pottery artifacts. The establishment of a nomadic society entails an emergence of social relations, affecting the patterns and roles each person is tasked with as means for survival. Farmers often found ways to expand agricultural posts by planting on hills and slopes, finding ways to work around environmental and land challenges. Similarly, developments in agriculture enabled societies to focus on central organization, planning and the development of urban centers.

Agriculture in the absence of modern industry was a critical source of wealth, even though pre-industrial outputs were fairly low. The advent of tools such as mechanization, mass-produced fertilizer, scientific plant breeding and other farming techniques enabled the average farmer to increase his yield, therefore enabling him to feed more people. Aiding in not only population growth, but also the specialization and division of labor needed to form a complex industrial society. Therefore, the expansion and industrialization of agriculture allowed for the evolution of an agrarian society, where wealth came from agriculture, to a complex society, where manufacturing and industry become sources of wealth, and created a system that could support a division of labor, a political hierarchy and new institutions.

=== Division of labor ===
A core tenet of complex society was a transition from agrarian and kinship societies to complex, industrial societies. The transition occurs as a result of specialization in the means of labor, with some people rising to power as rulers and administrators, while others remained as food producers. This was one of the first divisions of labor. In an agrarian or simple society, there is no division between the producers and the maintainers. The whole community was involved in both decision-making and food production. Small communities did not have the need for this division, as the whole community worked together. However, the splitting of agriculture and governance was arguably the most crucial division of labor, and created lasting consequences. Specifically, it resulted in the emergence of the state as a concentration of a society's power.

This kind of relationship, one between the producers and the maintainers (or rulers), is a highly unequal and dependent one. Historically, internal differentiation has usually preceded the arrival of state structures, and while that alone has not necessarily been enough to push every society through the evolution from primitive to complex, it remains that specialization is a prerequisite for the emergence of a ruling class—rulers specialize in power. A division of labor encourages a society to differentiate, and heightens the material and intellectual culture of that society.

While division of labor and specialization are similar, they are not the same. Specialization does not always end in a division of labor. One person can specialize in growing wheat while another can specialize in growing corn, but that does not end in the evolution of a state. The emergence of a political hierarchy, discussed next, was a direct result of a division of labor that ended in a concentration of power.

=== Political hierarchy ===
Complex and industrialized societies consist of people divided into different sectors of the labor spectrum. Leaders and administrators are in charge of providing security, safety and coordination of the state activities. Control based on ranking from centralized power first presupposed modern states in the form of chiefdoms. Such rulers possess monopoly on resources, as well as the mechanisms to resolve conflict and deliver punishment. Political hierarchy entails a division between specialization, placing some members in charge of administration and institutions with the highest controls of enforcement. Political hierarchy and organization renders the vast majority of people away from centralized power roles and allocates decisions into a few hands enabling them to pursue policies which might benefit the state or the power holder. Politically hierarchy is not usually decided by the existence of social contracts, where some agree to grow food while others provide political services and protection, but rather through some

Part of this political hierarchy is the coercion of the producers by the ruling class played a big role in the development of civilizations. For example, once a person or a group of people gain power, they will exercise their power by creating institutions and developments which the producers must then support, most commonly through force.

=== Institutions ===
The creation and sustainability of civilization and a state entails social, cultural and institutional complexity, otherwise called “ultra-sociality.” High position holders, through the arm of the state, hold the power to define, enforce and execute rules and violence. States hold unanimous power to resolve disagreement and possess the mechanisms to coerce people as means to achieve order. Institutions assist rulers in the coordination of behaviors and norms, enabling the control of behaviors among large groups of humans. In fact, institutions with flexibility to absorb different polities are crucial to the development and stability of an emerging state. The role of institutions is thus crucial in the implementation of standard practices to ensure cohesive order and rules for interactions.

Without this type and scale of human organization, it would have been impossible for societies to emerge from their agrarian roots. Institutions allow for the state to coordinate the actions of its society so as to defend itself, settle disputes within its borders, improve production means, protect the welfare of its people, and thus create the material and cultural developments we appreciate today.

== Socioeconomics during pre-industrial era ==
During the pre-industrial era, population size within cities were small with elites covering only 2% of the population. It was important for cities to be located close to watered areas and would depend on trade through ports and this would include rivers. With cities being located near water areas, they depended on farmers for agricultural produce. Agriculture was the main source of wealth and food. Farmers, cattle farmers, fishermen and hunters were the main producers of food. Farmers were not as fortunate to trade, for which they were limited to because of the cost of the transportation. This would mean that trade was limited to a four-mile radius. Because agriculture was the main source of wealth, farmers would have to sell their harvest right away, having them sell their produce for a low price. In other cases, farmers would feed on their cultivation instead of selling their produce. Many peasants would live on the lands of the elite and cultivate their produce within the lands and give it to the elites once it was harvested. During the beginning of the pre-industrial area this was how farmers would pay their rent and the landowners would sell the produce at a high price.

Labour work was not only achieved by everyday workers but it was also accomplished with slaves. Many of these slaves were captured during wars, were enslaved from different countries, and lost children. In some occasions people had been sold by either their spouse or parents, or had debt and became a slave in order to pay their debt. With slavery dating as far back as early 300 BCE, from a census taken in Attica, had occupied around 400,000 slaves. During the pre-industrial era, labour was forced and was implemented by the government and landlords. This would also mean that many peasants were forced into labour. It was very important for employers to hire someone when they were recommended. It was important for the employer to trust the employee, many would form networks in helping each other by proving a recommendation in exchange of returning the favor. Many people who lived in the countryside or within the city, would find themselves moving around looking for an affordable place to live. Some countryside folks would find an occupation by working for an elite.

== Mesoamerica ==
Southeastern Mesoamerica became the first to develop into a complex society. Maize was very important in the early pre-classic period. Even though farming was very important, there were also hunters, gatherers, and fisherman. Food produce besides corn, bean and squash, squirrel, deer, birds, snakes, crocodile, iguana were also consumed.

== Egypt ==
Prior to 3000 BCE the Nile river valley and delta were, like the majority of the world, small agricultural societies loosely associated with little cohesion. The first unified kingdom was founded by King Menes in 3100 BCE which led to a series of successful dynasties which cultivated the development of Egyptian cultural identity. By the Third Dynasty of the Old Kingdom, Egypt was a fully integrated empire with a complex vertical hierarchical bureaucracy which enacted the will of its ruler and interacted with every citizen. The economic strength and military might of these dynasties spread their influence and presence through the Eastern Mediterranean as well as into North Africa and southward in Nubian controlled territories.

== France ==
France is a good example of a complex society due to its history being well known and documented. Thus, historians can trace just how the rise of medieval France occurred. The evolution of ancient Gaul into early modern France provides an example to how complex societies have come into being. There existed a degree of continuity in the hierarchical organization of France from the Iron Age to the 18th century. When the Romans attempted to organize Gaul, they altered the tribal structures which were not simple, but were rather complex chiefdoms.

The integration of a large territory in France happened repeatedly between the Iron Age and the early modern age. It did not happen all at once, however, occurring in small steps. The integration proceeded in a hierarchical manner.

Disintegration also occurred in a multi-step process. France was disintegrated into units that were fragmented into counties and in some regions, even further into castellanies. By the end of the ninth century, at least twenty-nine independent politics were in France. Nearly a century later, the number had grown to at least fifty-five.

The history of France traces the evolution of hierarchical complexity as complex large-scale societies came about through warfare. Early modern France was a five-level hierarchy where the largest level of organization was divided in provinces, gouvernements, which was then in turn subdivided into smaller units called bailliages. This theory makes sense as a society can engage in warfare to grow and increase in size, resources and diversity.

== Alternative theories ==
In a 2009 paper Turchin and Gavrilets argue that the emergence of complex societies is a response to the existential threat of violent warfare. They build upon the work of Karl Jaspers' conception of the Axial Age, whereby in the era 800 - 200 BC human societies undergo a revolutionary shift. The central mechanism which pushes societies into a complex stage is the intensity of the warfare. When war takes place across a meta-ethnic frontier, such as between agricultural and nomadic peoples, is when warfare is sufficiently intense to shift the society into a different state. Within the Axial Age, an increase in warfare intensity between the steppe peoples and the Persian and Chinese peoples forged the Achaemenid Persian empire and the Han Chinese empire, both complex societies.

This theory has also been extended to explain the rise of complex states in Africa and Asia. The colonization of these places by European powers functioned as a meta-ethnic frontier in which warfare met the necessary level of intensity to forge the complex society.

Another theory deals with the social evolution of altruism versus selfishness in the context of conflicting forces. D.S. Wilson and E.O. Wilson state that selfishness beats altruism within a group but groups that are altruistic beat out groups that are selfish as there is a higher level of cooperation and coordination within an altruistic group. Whether or not a group will be altruistic and cohesive is dependent on both individual efforts as well as exterior forces. The success of a group in competition with other groups is dependent upon cooperation within.

== The Collapse of Complex Societies ==
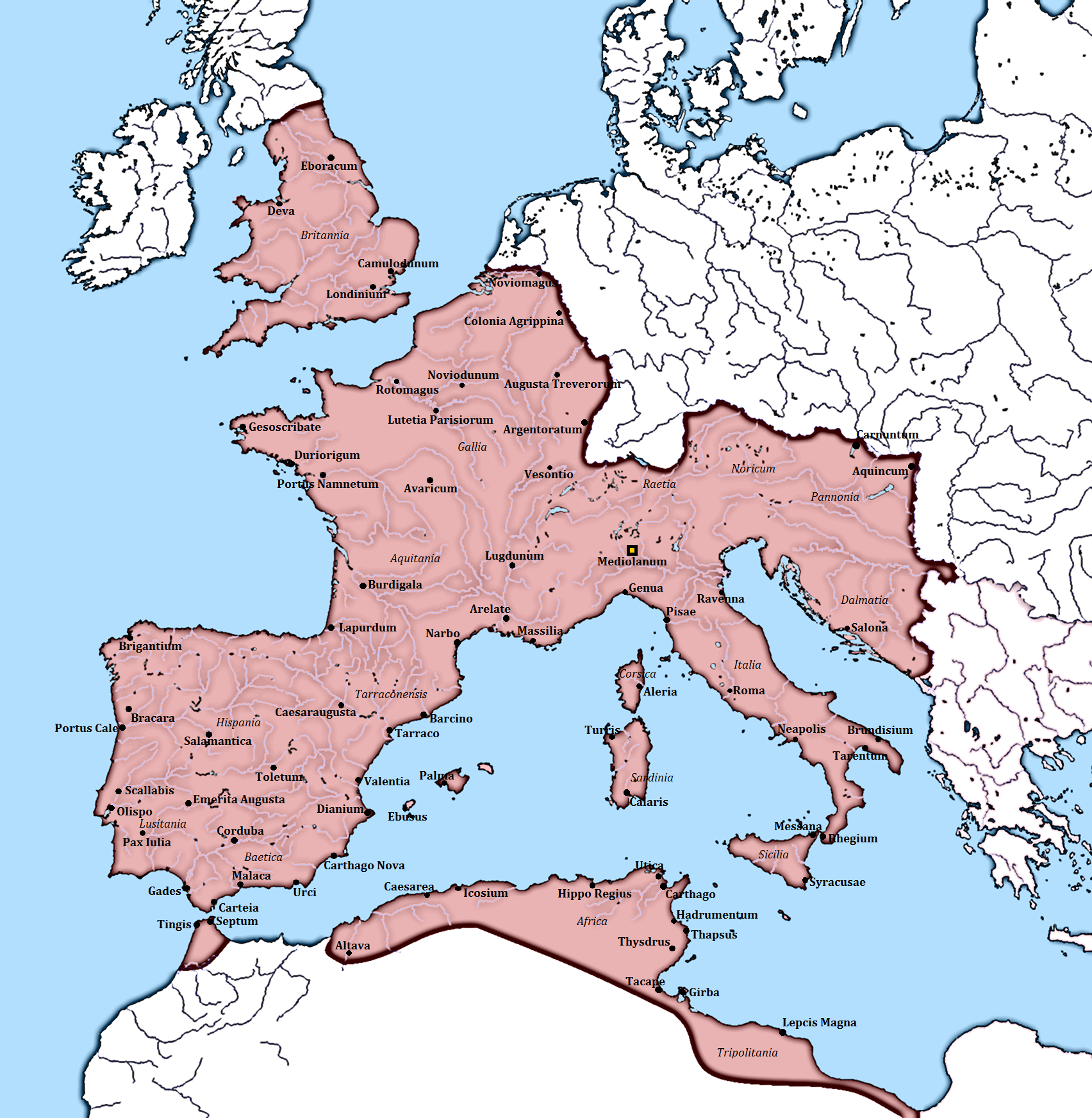
The territory controlled by the Western Roman Imperial court following the nominal division of the Roman Empire after the death of Emperor Theodosius I in A.D. 395

Joseph Tainter (the author of The Collapse of Complex Societies) argued that as complex societies try to deal with the problems that they face, they tend to become more and more complex. This complexity exists under the purview of mechanisms that coordinate numerous differentiated and specialized social and economic roles by which complex societies are recognized. To deal with the problems that it faces, a society resorts to creating bureaucratic layers, infrastructure, and changes of social class that are relevant in addressing the problems. Tainter gives the Western Roman Empire, the Maya civilization, and the Chaco culture as examples of collapsed complex societies. In the case of the Roman Empire, for example, reduced agricultural output was experienced coupled with growing population and dropping in the availability of per-capita energy, and to deal with these issues the Empire responded by capturing the neighboring empires where there were energy surpluses and other supplies like metal, grains, and human labor. This did not solve the problem in the long run because the Roman Empire expanded more and bigger challenges such as escalating costs related to communications, army, and civil governments and also crop failure became massive. Now, these challenges could no longer be dealt with by the same method of conquering more neighboring territories because that would make the problems even bigger. Efforts by Domitian and Constantine the Great to maintain cohesion within the empire through authoritarian means failed because it only strained the population more and eventually led to the breaking of the empire into two territories, east and west splits, and overtime, the west broke further into smaller units. The eastern split, though did not get fragmented immediately because it was able to capture some weak neighboring territories, would later and slowly crumble. The crumbling of the West Roman Empire was catastrophic and which Tainter argues that was the preference of the majority of everyone involved. The collapsing of West Roman Empire is a case where it is demonstrated that “complexity of the society” could no longer be sustained as would be established by Tainter's "Diminishing Return of Complexity". This gained the support of Ugo Bardi, Sara Falsini, and Ilaria Perissi's study "Toward a General Theory of Societal Collapse. A Biophysical Examination of Tainter’s Model of the Diminishing Returns of Complexity" which related Tainter's model of collapsing of complex societies to a model they called socioeconomic system model. Further support of Tainter's Model of the "Diminishing Returns of Complexity" could be ascribed Curtis (2012)’s "population-resources framework". In the framework, the collapsing of societies in the pre-industrial was related to societies' "failure to combat the destabilizing effects of demographic pressure on an (often) finite pool of resources, which put the future sustainability of settlements in danger" (pg. 18).

== See also ==
- Division of labour
- Game theory
- Human history
- Social complexity
- Stateless society
