= Karkarichinkat =

Archaeological sites in Mali

Karkarichinkat comprises two archaeological sites (Karkarichinkat Nord - KN05 and Karkarichinat Sud - KS05) located in West Africa within the Lower Tilemsi Valley of Eastern Mali. The sites were first recorded by Raymond Mauny in 1952, and subsequently excavated by Andrew Smith and Katie Manning.

== Archaeological findings ==
Extensive excavations at Karkarichinkat Nord have revealed some of the earliest evidence for domestic pearl millet in sub-Saharan Africa as well as ritualised deposits of domestic cattle, dating to the second half of the 3rd millennium BCE.

There were a total of 11 sets of human remains found at the sites of Karkarichikat Nord (KN05) and Karkarichinkat Sud (KS05). Based on radiocarbon dates, Karkarichikat Nord was occupied from 2620 to 2200 cal. years BCE. A radiocarbon date of 3310 BP was obtained from surface material found at Karkarichikat Sud.

Karkarichikat is known for having some of the oldest dated evidence for intentional dental modification. The modified teeth found at Karkarichikat Nord is the first area in the region to show evidence of this practice. Most modifications would be the result of trauma or due to a specific task-related wear, such as chewing on tree bark. These modifications, however, appear to have been done for aesthetic purposes. The filed teeth came from women, which shows that these modifications were possibly sex-specific within their culture.
