= List of knights bachelor appointed in 1919 =

Rank

Knight Bachelor is the oldest and lowest-ranking form of knighthood in the British honours system; it is the rank granted to a man who has been knighted by the monarch but not inducted as a member of one of the organised orders of chivalry. Women are not knighted; in practice, the equivalent award for a woman is appointment as Dame Commander of the Order of the British Empire (founded in 1917).

== Knights bachelor appointed in 1919 ==
Date	Name	Notes	Ref
14 February 1919	Paul Ogden Lawrence	Justice of the High Court of Justice	
18 February 1919	Edward Bray	Judge of the Bloomsbury County Court; Chairman of the Council of County Court Judges	
18 February 1919	Thomas Willes Chitty	Master of the Supreme Court of Justice, King's Bench Division	
18 February 1919	Sigmund Dannreuther, CB	Controller and Accounting Officer, Ministry of Munitions	
18 February 1919	Edward Rae Davson	President of the Associated Chamber of Commerce, British West Indies	
18 February 1919	Robert Blyth Greig, LLD	Scottish Board of Agriculture	
18 February 1919	William Leslie Mackenzie, MD, LLD	Medical Member of the Local Government Board for Scotland	
18 February 1919	Hugh William Orange, CB, CIE	Accountant-General, Board of Education	
18 February 1919	Alfred Walter Soward, CB	A Commissioner of Inland Revenue; Secretary, Estate Duty Office	
18 February 1919	Richard Stephens Taylor	President of the Law Society; Chairman of the Law Society Advisory Committee; and Chairman of the Civil Liabilities Committee	
18 February 1919	George Danvers Thane, LLD, FRCS	Principal Inspector under Cruelty to Animals Act, Home Office	
18 February 1919	Lucas White King, CSI, LLD		
18 February 1919	Leicester Paul Beaufort, BCL	lately Judge of the High Court of Northern Rhodesia	
18 February 1919	The Hon. Worley Bassett Edwards	a Judge of the Supreme Court of the Dominion of New Zealand	
18 February 1919	Walter Edwin Gurney	lately Controller and Auditor-General of the Union of South Africa	
18 February 1919	Thomas Wagstaffe Haycraft	Chief Justice of Grenada	
18 February 1919	Lt-Col. John Hewat, MB	Lieutenant-Colonel, South African Defence Force; Member of the House of Assembly of the Union of South Africa; and Assistant Director of Medical Services of the said Union	
18 February 1919	Samuel Hordern	President of the Royal Agricultural Society of New South Wales	
18 February 1919	Henry Jones		
18 February 1919	Joseph James Kinsey		
18 February 1919	James William Murison, LLB	Judge of the Court for Zanzibar	
18 February 1919	Boshan Wei Yuk, CMG	formerly Unofficial Member of the Legislative Council of the Colony of Hong Kong	
18 February 1919	Ernest Edward Fletcher	a Puisne Judge of the High Court at Calcutta	
18 February 1919	Chimanlal Harilal Setalvad	Vice-Chancellor, Bombay University	
18 February 1919	Joseph Henry Stone, CIE	Director of Public Instruction, Madras	
18 February 1919	William Arthur Beardsell	Sheriff of Madras	
18 February 1919	Praphulla Chandra Roy, CIE, DSc	late Provincial Educational Service, Bengal	
18 February 1919	Robert Herriot Henderson, CIE		
18 February 1919	George Cochrane Godfrey	Coal Controller in India	
18 March 1919	Patrick Quinn, MVO		
19 March 1919	Frederick Arthur Greer	Justice of the High Court of Justice	
19 May 1919	Thomas William Allen	Chairman of the Parliamentary Committee of the Co-operative Congress	
19 May 1919	Charles Barrie, JP, DL	ex-Lord Provost of Dundee	
19 May 1919	George Bean		
19 May 1919	Lewis Beard	Town Clerk of Blackburn	
19 May 1919	Reginald Theodore Blomfield	past President of the Royal Institute of British Architects	
19 May 1919	George Moore Chamberlin, JP, DL	Lord Mayor of Norwich, 1916–1917; President of Norwich Chamber of Commerce	
19 May 1919	John Coode-Adams		
19 May 1919	Lt-Col. Joseph Montagu Cotterill, CMG	RAMC(T)	
19 May 1919	Arthur Lowes Dickinson, MA		
19 May 1919	David Duncan, JP		
19 May 1919	Col. Henry Arthur Fletcher, CVO		
19 May 1919	William Croft Forrest, JP		
19 May 1919	Capt. John Malcolm Fraser, RNVR		
19 May 1919	William Samuel Glyn-Jones		
19 May 1919	Israel Gollancz, LittD	Professor of English Language and Literature, King's College, London; Secretary of the British Academy	
19 May 1919	John Little Green, OBE		
19 May 1919	Richard Armand Gregory, FRAS	Professor of Astronomy, Queen's College, London	
19 May 1919	Henry James Hall		
19 May 1919	Walter Henry Harris, CMG	Senior Sheriff of the City of London	
19 May 1919	John Harrison, JP	Mayor of Stockton-on-Tees, 1915–19	
19 May 1919	Col. Joseph Hewitt		
19 May 1919	Francis Adams Hyett	Chairman of the Gloucestershire Education Committee	
19 May 1919	Alfred Jermyn, JP		
19 May 1919	William George Yarworth-Jones		
19 May 1919	Arthur Lucas	Chairman of the Great Ormond Street Hospital for Children "for forty years"	
19 May 1919	Edward Malins, MD, FRCP		
19 May 1919	James Martin, JP	Chairman of the London Chamber of Commerce	
19 May 1919	William Martin, JP, FSA(Scot)	Glasgow City Councillor	
19 May 1919	Christopher Thomas Needham, MP		
19 May 1919	Walter Powell Nicholas	Chairman of the Rhondda local tribunal and of the County of Glamorgan National Insurance Committee	
19 May 1919	John Hubert Oakley	President of the Surveyors' Institution	
19 May 1919	Robert Peacock	Chief Constable of Manchester since 1898	
19 May 1919	George Phillips-Parker	Mayor of the Metropolitan Borough of Holborn 1913-17	
19 May 1919	Harold Rufus Pink, JP	Mayor of Portsmouth "for several years"	
19 May 1919	Alfred Henry Read		
19 May 1919	Albion Henry Herbert Richardson, CBE		
19 May 1919	Oswald Stoll		
19 May 1919	Alfred Aspinall Tobin, KC		
19 May 1919	Charles Sissmore Tomes, MA, LLD, FRS, FRCS		
19 May 1919	Lt-Col. Francis William Towle, CBE		
19 May 1919	Thomas Jenner Verrall, LLD	Chairman of the Central Medical War Committee for the past four years	
19 May 1919	Fenwick Shadforth Watts	Chairman of the Shipping Federation and a former President of the Chamber of Shipping of the United Kingdom	
19 May 1919	John Ernest Hodder-Williams		
19 May 1919	Harry Lauder	Not formally conferred until 23 February 1921.	
19 May 1919	Jonathan North, JP	Mayor of Leicester 1914-18	
19 May 1919	William Ridgeway, DSc	Professor of Archaeology, Cambridge University	
19 May 1919	John Stavridi	Consul-General of Greece in London	
19 May 1919	James Gadesden Wainwright, JP	late Treasurer of St. Thomas' Hospital	
19 May 1919	Thomas Wilton, JP		
3 June 1919	George Fenwick, JP	Founder and for over thirty years Director of the New Zealand Press Association. Public services.	
6 June 1919	Henry Capel Cure	If he were dubbed, the event does not appear to have been gazetted.	
10 July 1919	John Baker, MD	Superintendent of Broadmoor Criminal Lunatic Asylum	
10 July 1919	Lt-Col. John George Beharrel, DSO		
10 July 1919	Charles Bright		
10 July 1919	Isaac Connell	Secretary to the Scottish Chamber of Agriculture	
10 July 1919	Harry Courthorpe-Munroe, KC		
10 July 1919	Charles Davidson		
10 July 1919	Walter de Frece		
10 July 1919	John S. Henry		
10 July 1919	Sydney George Higgins, CBE	Assistant Accountant-General, Ministry of Shipping	
10 July 1919	James Allan Horne	Controller of Munitions, Bombay	
10 July 1919	John Henry MacFarland		
10 July 1919	John Charles Miles	Solicitor to the Ministry of Labour	
10 July 1919	Francis George Newbolt, KC		
10 July 1919	John Rumney Nicholson		
10 July 1919	Lt-Col. Hugh Arthur Rose, DSO		
10 July 1919	Charles Tamlin Ruthen, OBE	Deputy Controller of Accommodation, H.M. Office of Works	
10 July 1919	Douglas Shields		
10 July 1919	Thomas Sims, CB	Director of Works, Admiralty	
10 July 1919	William Henry Wells		
10 July 1919	William Howard Winterbotham	Official Solicitor since 1895	
10 July 1919	Henry Arthur Wynne, LLD	Chief Crown Solicitor for Ireland	
29 July 1919	Banister Flight Fletcher	Sheriff of the City of London	
29 July 1919	Col. William Robert Smith, MD	Sheriff of the City of London	
18 August 1919	Capt. Robert Henry Muirhead Collins, CMG		
18 August 1919	Robert Charles Brown, MB, FRCP, FRCS	Consulting Medical Officer of Preston Royal Infirmary	
18 August 1919	Henry Busby Bird, JP	Mayor of Shoreditch	
18 August 1919	Ald. George Edmund Davies, JP		
18 August 1919	William Boyd Dawkins, MA, DSc, FRS	Honorary Professor of Geology and Palaeontology in Victoria University, Manchester	
18 August 1919	Knowles Edge, JP	Mayor of Bolton, 1917–18	
18 August 1919	Robert Vaughan Gower, OBE, FRGS	Mayor of Tunbridge Wells, 1917–19	
18 August 1919	Cuthbert Cartwright Grundy, JP	President Royal Cambrian Art Society	
18 August 1919	Thomas Henderson, JP		
18 August 1919	Charles James Jackson, JP, FSA		
18 August 1919	Leon Levison		
18 August 1919	John Young Walker MacAlister, FSA, FRGS	President of Library Association and Secretary of the Royal Society of Medicine	
18 August 1919	William Maxwell	President of the International Co-operation Alliance	
18 August 1919	Henry Francis New	Mayor of St Marylebone, 1917–19	
18 August 1919	Julian Walter Orde	Secretary of the Royal Automobile Club	
18 August 1919	James Wallace Paton, JP	Mayor of Southport, 1908-9	
18 August 1919	Maj. John Theodore Prestige		
18 August 1919	Francis Watson, JP		
18 August 1919	William Ireland De Courcy Wheeler, MD, FRCS		
18 August 1919	Thomas Williams	General Manager, London and North-Western Railway	
18 August 1919	Col. Augustus Charles Woolley, VD		
18 August 1919	Joseph Duveen	The honour was conferred on 5 November 1919.	
18 August 1919	Leon Levison		
18 August 1919	Alfred Waldron Smithers, JP, MP		
18 August 1919	Joshua Kelley Waddilove		
18 August 1919	William Morris Carter, CBE	Chief Justice of the High Court of Uganda	
18 August 1919	Frederick Alan Van der Meulen, OBE	Judge of the Supreme Court, Colony of the Gambia	
18 August 1919	Joseph Cooke Verco, MD		
18 August 1919	Abdur Rahim	Judge of the High Court of Judicature at Madras	
18 August 1919	Khan Zulfikar Ali Khan, CSI	Additional Member of the Imperial Legislative Council	
18 August 1919	Frank Willington Carter, CIE, CBE	Additional Member of the Council of the Governor of Bengal	
18 August 1919	Col. Gerald Ponsonby Lenox-Conyngham, RE	Superintendent of the Trigonometrical Survey, Dehra Dun, United Provinces	
18 August 1919	Norman Cranstoun Macleod	Chief Justice of the High Court of Bombay	

== Knights who died before they could receive the accolade ==
It was announced in the 1919 Birthday Honours that a knighthood was to be bestowed on William Allan Ironside (an additional Member of the Indian Legislative Council), but he died before he received the accolade. By a royal warrant gazetted on 22 July 1919, George V declared that his widow, Ellen Ironside, "shall have, hold and enjoy the same style; title, place and precedence to which she would have been entitled had her said husband survived and received either personally or by Letters-Patent under the Great Seal the degree, style and title of a Knight Bachelor".

The London Gazette also reported that the King intended to bestow a knighthood on Ernest Adolphus O'Bryen, formerly the mayor of Hampstead, but he died before he received the accolade. By a royal warrant gazetted with the date 30 May 1919, George V declared that his widow, Gertrude Mary O'Bryen, should also be afforded the style of a knight's widow.
