= IHRA =

IHRA may refer to:

- International Hot Rod Association
- International Hotel & Restaurant Association
- International Harm Reduction Association
- International Holocaust Remembrance Alliance
- Intersex Human Rights Australia
