= Oliver Frederick Ford =

English interior designer

Oliver Frederick Ford (19 June 1925 – 17 October 1992) was an English interior designer. He served as decorator to the Queen Mother after receiving Royal Warrant in 1974. His other clients included the Duke of Marlborough at Blenheim, Mrs Harry Oppenheimer, Lord McAlpine of West Green and The Dorchester.

== Biography ==
Ford was born on 19 June 1925 in Bournemouth, Hampshire (now Dorset).

He served in the Royal Air Force during World War II as a volunteer reserve, initially in signals, then in air sea rescue. Ford attended Arts University Bournemouth where he studied the decorative arts. He headed the London office of Jansen Ltd, a French firm of decorators.

He appeared as a castaway on the BBC Radio programme Desert Island Discs on 5 March 1977.

Ford died "suddenly" on 17 October 1992 while standing in the Great Hall of his home in Lacock, Wiltshire.

== Bewley Court ==
The surviving firm at the time of Ford's death, Oliver Ford, included a subsidiary, Howard Chairs.

Bewley Court, the 14th-century home owned by Ford, has its own chapel and more than a dozen gardens; it is a Grade I listed building near Lacock in Wiltshire. As Ford left no heirs, Bewley Court was held by the Oliver Ford Charitable Trust, with proceeds donated to the mentally handicapped. By 1995, the Trust had ceased and was replaced by another registered charity, the Oliver Ford Foundation (also known as the Oliver Ford Will Trust) which in 2016 made donations to charities working in mental health and with children and young people, and made grants to students at the Victoria and Albert Museum, the Royal Horticultural Society and the Furniture History Society.

== Tribute ==
British businessman Alistair McAlpine (1942–2014) was a personal friend of Ford's and travelling companion, and wrote a tribute to him in his 2002 memoir:

When I remember Oliver Ford it is not fine curtains and grand houses I think of, but the Tanami Track, the banks of the Diamantina River and the Simpson Desert, sleeping on the sand in a swag under the stars, more stars than in all heavens put together. He was to my ex-wife Romilly and me a good friend.

== Bibliography ==
- Lomas, Elizabeth (1 January 2001). Guide to the Archive of Art and Design, Victoria & Albert Museum. Fitzroy Dearborn Publishers. ISBN 978-1-57958-315-6.
