= International Luxury Hotel Association =

Nonprofit organization

- Abbreviation: ILHA
- Formation: 2008
- Type: Nonprofit corporation
- Legal status: Non-profit association
- Purpose: To promote growth in the full-service hospitality industry by providing an unbiased source of information for owners and operators of hotels (independent and brands), cruise lines, private residences and other luxury hospitality organizations.
- Headquarters: Florida, United States
- Region served: Global
- President: Barak Hirschowitz
- Website: theilha.com

The International Luxury Hotel Association (ILHA) is a nonprofit organization whose purpose is unifying and advancing the luxury hospitality industry. The association is the luxury hotel industry's influencer that reaches hotel and travel professionals through its media channels and publications. It brings together industry experts and thought leaders to answer the greatest challenges facing the luxury hotel business today.

== History ==
The International Luxury Hotel Association started in 2008 as Luxury Hoteliers established by a group of 50 global luxury hotel executives and headed up by its current President Barak Hirschowitz. At that time, their purpose was to share best practices despite often being in competition with one another. It was all about transparency and keeping pace with the changing needs of luxury hotel guests. Few years after, due to the growth of the membership, it was re-established in Florida as a non-profit organization with the name International Luxury Hotel Association.

Each fall, the ILHA holds its annual INSPIRE conference. INSPIRE 2019 was held at the Four Seasons Hotel in Miami. The INSPIRE 2020 event was held virtually and 3000+ attendees. It brought together owners, operators, developers, tech providers, investors and hotel brands to explore the latest trends and date in luxury travel.

== Partnerships and services ==
The International Luxury Hotel Association brings together luxury hotel experts, travel companies, industry professionals, governments and educators with the common goal of improving standards in service and design in the luxury segment of the hotel industry. The ILHA achieves these goals by organizing annual Luxury Hotel Conference, publishing its bimonthly premier magazine tagged Luxury Hotelier, and providing other resources for education, training, and networking to its members.

The ILHA has established a partnership with TrustYou; an online reputation management company, to produce the North America Guest Experience Awards. In 2015 it also established a partnership with PR Newswire to help the outfit distribute its content to the hospitality industry and also enhance the luxury hotel enterprise.

== See also ==
- The Leading Hotels of the World
- International Hotel & Restaurant Association
