= Listed buildings in Lacock =

Buildings in Lacock, Wiltshire, England

Lacock is a village and civil parish in Wiltshire, England. It contains 184 listed buildings that are recorded in the National Heritage List for England. Of these five grade I, twelve are grade II* and 167 are grade II.

This list is based on the information retrieved online from Historic England.

== Key ==
| Grade | Criteria |
|---|---|
| I | Buildings that are of exceptional interest |
| II* | Particularly important buildings of more than special interest |
| II | Buildings that are of special interest |

== Listing ==
| Name | Grade | Location | Type | Completed (Note: The date given is the date used by Historic England as significant for the initial building or that of an important part in the structure's description.) | Date designated | Grid ref. (Note: The grid reference is based on the British national grid reference system, sometimes known as OSGB36, used by the Ordnance Survey.) Geo-coordinates | Notes | Entry number (Note: The "List Entry Number" is a unique number assigned to each listed building and scheduled monument by Historic England.) | Image | Wikidata |
|---|---|---|---|---|---|---|---|---|---|---|
| Barn to South East of Showell Farmhouse | II | A350 | | | 20 December 1960 | ST9094070932; 51°26′14″N 2°07′54″W | | 1198151 | Upload Photo | Q26492607 |
| Front Lodge, Lackham College | II | A350 | | | 7 January 1987 | ST9104270222; 51°25′51″N 2°07′49″W | | 1283989 | Upload Photo | Q26572798 |
| Milestone at Junction with Corsham Road | II | A350 | | | 7 January 1987 | ST9127969033; 51°25′13″N 2°07′37″W | | 1022146 | Upload Photo | Q26273010 |
| Showell Farmhouse | II | A350 | | | 20 December 1960 | ST9090970945; 51°26′15″N 2°07′56″W | | 1022145 | Upload Photo | Q26273009 |
| Bewley Court | I | Bewley Lane, Bewley Court | | | 20 December 1960 | ST9263068509; 51°24′56″N 2°06′27″W | | 1363958 | Upload Photo | Q17530060 |
| Coach House to the Old Malthouse | II | Bewley Lane | | | 7 January 1987 | ST9269068284; 51°24′49″N 2°06′23″W | | 1022129 | Upload Photo | Q26272995 |
| The Old Brewery House and Attached Premises | II | Bewley Lane | | | 7 January 1987 | ST9264668184; 51°24′45″N 2°06′26″W | | 1022128 | Upload Photo | Q26272993 |
| The Old Malthouse | II | Bewley Lane | | | 7 January 1987 | ST9269868270; 51°24′48″N 2°06′23″W | | 1363957 | Upload Photo | Q26645757 |
| Arnolds Farmhouse | II | Bowden Hill | | | 7 January 1987 | ST9336467838; 51°24′34″N 2°05′48″W | | 1198118 | Upload Photo | Q26492570 |
| Bowden Hill House | II | Bowden Hill | | | 7 January 1987 | ST9392867568; 51°24′26″N 2°05′19″W | | 1198125 | Upload Photo | Q26492578 |
| Bowden Park | I | Bowden Hill, Bowden Park | | | 20 December 1960 | ST9373168235; 51°24′47″N 2°05′30″W | | 1022132 | Upload Photo | Q17529217 |
| Church of St Anne | II | Bowden Hill | | | 7 January 1987 | ST9375867932; 51°24′37″N 2°05′28″W | | 1363962 | Upload Photo | Q26645760 |
| Conduit House | II* | Bowden Hill, Chippenham, SN15 2PP, SN152PP | | | 7 January 1987 | ST9376667979; 51°24′39″N 2°05′28″W | | 1363959 | Upload Photo | Q17546526 |
| East Lodge to Bowden Park | II | Bowden Hill, Bowden Park | | | 7 January 1987 | ST9413167947; 51°24′38″N 2°05′09″W | | 1284011 | Upload Photo | Q26572820 |
| Guest House at Bowden Park | II | Bowden Hill, Bowden Park | | | 7 January 1987 | ST9378768237; 51°24′47″N 2°05′27″W | | 1198091 | Upload Photo | Q26492543 |
| Harris Memorial in Churchyard South of Chancel of Church of St Anne | II | Bowden Hill | | | 7 January 1987 | ST9377167924; 51°24′37″N 2°05′27″W | | 1283975 | Upload Photo | Q26572786 |
| Ice House to North of Walled Garden at Bowden Park | II | Bowden Hill, Bowden Park | | | 7 January 1987 | ST9385968236; 51°24′47″N 2°05′23″W | | 1198092 | Upload Photo | Q26492544 |
| Milestone South East of Church of St Anne | II | Bowden Hill | | | 7 January 1987 | ST9384467892; 51°24′36″N 2°05′24″W | | 1022136 | Upload Photo | Q26273000 |
| St Anne's Churchyard | II | Bowden Hill, SN15 2PP | | | 8 November 2017 | ST9377567938; 51°24′38″N 2°05′27″W | | 1451013 | Upload Photo | Q66479112 |
| Stable Block at Bowden Park | II | Bowden Hill, Bowden Park | | | 7 January 1987 | ST9381968320; 51°24′50″N 2°05′25″W | | 1022133 | Upload Photo | Q26272998 |
| Terrace Wall and Balustrade to West and South of Bowden Park | II | Bowden Hill, Bowden Park | | | 7 January 1987 | ST9370668225; 51°24′47″N 2°05′31″W | | 1363960 | Upload Photo | Q26645758 |
| The Grotto at Bowden Park | II* | Bowden Hill, Bowden Park | | | 7 January 1987 | ST9380168094; 51°24′43″N 2°05′26″W | | 1022134 | Upload Photo | Q17534105 |
| Walls to Walled Garden at Bowden Park | II | Bowden Hill, Bowden Park | | | 7 January 1987 | ST9389568126; 51°24′44″N 2°05′21″W | | 1363961 | Upload Photo | Q26645759 |
| West Lodges and Gates to Bowden Park | II | Bowden Hill, Bowden Park | | | 7 January 1987 | ST9310668046; 51°24′41″N 2°06′02″W | | 1022130 | Upload Photo | Q26272996 |
| 7, Bowden Hill | II | 7, Bowden Hill | | | 7 January 1987 | ST9309767943; 51°24′38″N 2°06′02″W | | 1022135 | Upload Photo | Q26272999 |
| Apple Tree Cottage | II | 15, Bowden Hill | | | 7 January 1987 | ST9332867899; 51°24′36″N 2°05′50″W | | 1022131 | Upload Photo | Q26272997 |
| Cantax House and Front Garden Wall | II* | Cantax Hill | | | 20 December 1960 | ST9148668597; 51°24′59″N 2°07′26″W | | 1022139 | Cantax House and Front Garden Wall More images | Q17534115 |
| The Old Rectory | II | Cantax Hill | | | 7 January 1987 | ST9136268771; 51°25′04″N 2°07′32″W | | 1022142 | Upload Photo | Q26273006 |
| The Surgery | II | Cantax Hill | | | 7 January 1987 | ST9149368577; 51°24′58″N 2°07′25″W | | 1022140 | Upload Photo | Q26273004 |
| Town Bridge | II | Cantax Hill | | | 20 December 1960 | ST9152668568; 51°24′58″N 2°07′24″W | | 1363924 | Upload Photo | Q26645727 |
| 2, Cantax Hill | II | 2, Cantax Hill | | | 15 December 1972 | ST9151568616; 51°24′59″N 2°07′24″W | | 1022137 | 2, Cantax Hill More images | Q26273001 |
| 3, Cantax Hill | II | 3, Cantax Hill | | | 7 January 1987 | ST9149168636; 51°25′00″N 2°07′25″W | | 1022138 | 3, Cantax Hill More images | Q26273003 |
| 5-7, Cantax Hill | II | 5-7, Cantax Hill | | | 17 May 1984 | ST9145568632; 51°25′00″N 2°07′27″W | | 1022141 | 5-7, Cantax Hill More images | Q26273005 |
| Church of St Stephen (united Reformed and Methodist) | II | Chapel Hill | | | 7 January 1987 | ST9151368666; 51°25′01″N 2°07′24″W | | 1022144 | Upload Photo | Q26273008 |
| Sundawn | II | 2, Chapel Hill | | | 7 January 1987 | ST9150668647; 51°25′00″N 2°07′25″W | | 1022143 | Sundawn More images | Q26273007 |
| 4, Chapel Hill | II | 4, Chapel Hill | | | 15 December 1972 | ST9153568636; 51°25′00″N 2°07′23″W | | 1363925 | Upload Photo | Q26645728 |
| Church of St Cyriac | I | Church Street | | | 20 December 1960 | ST9170868566; 51°24′58″N 2°07′14″W | | 1198216 | Church of St Cyriac More images | Q15979335 |
| Drying Shed in Tanyard | II | Church Street | | | 7 January 1987 | ST9172268619; 51°24′59″N 2°07′14″W | | 1198210 | Drying Shed in Tanyard More images | Q26494164 |
| Feilding Monument in Churchyard East of Chancel of Church of St Cyriac | II | Church Street | | | 7 January 1987 | ST9172968571; 51°24′58″N 2°07′13″W | | 1022155 | Upload Photo | Q26273020 |
| Five Monuments Scattered in South West Angle of Churchyard of Church of St Cyriac | II | Church Street | | | 7 January 1987 | ST9169468536; 51°24′57″N 2°07′15″W | | 1022153 | Five Monuments Scattered in South West Angle of Churchyard of Church of St Cyriac More images | Q26273017 |
| Group of Seven Monuments in Churchyard South of South Aisle of Church of St Cyriac | II | Church Street | | | 7 January 1987 | ST9170468545; 51°24′57″N 2°07′14″W | | 1198251 | Group of Seven Monuments in Churchyard South of South Aisle of Church of St Cyriac More images | Q26494202 |
| The Carpenters Arms | II | Church Street | | | 20 December 1960 | ST9164068561; 51°24′58″N 2°07′18″W | | 1363933 | The Carpenters Arms More images | Q26645735 |
| Three Monuments in Churchyard about 25 Metres South of Chancel of Church of St Cyriac | II | Church Street | | | 7 January 1987 | ST9172468539; 51°24′57″N 2°07′13″W | | 1022154 | Three Monuments in Churchyard about 25 Metres South of Chancel of Church of St Cyriac More images | Q26273018 |
| Three Monuments in Churchyard Adjacent to South Wall of Chancel of Church of St Cyriac | II | Church Street | | | 7 January 1987 | ST9172068564; 51°24′58″N 2°07′14″W | | 1198268 | Three Monuments in Churchyard Adjacent to South Wall of Chancel of Church of St Cyriac More images | Q26494218 |
| Tucker Memorial in Churchyard about 3 Metres North of Tower of Church of St Cyriac | II | Church Street | | | 7 January 1987 | ST9169668574; 51°24′58″N 2°07′15″W | | 1022151 | Tucker Memorial in Churchyard about 3 Metres North of Tower of Church of St Cyriac More images | Q26273015 |
| Two Monuments about 9 Metres West of South Aisle of Church of St Cyriac | II | Church Street | | | 7 January 1987 | ST9168768563; 51°24′58″N 2°07′15″W | | 1283949 | Two Monuments about 9 Metres West of South Aisle of Church of St Cyriac More images | Q26572762 |
| Two Monuments in Churchyard by Path South of South Transept of Church of St Cyriac | II | Church Street | | | 7 January 1987 | ST9171368553; 51°24′57″N 2°07′14″W | | 1363932 | Two Monuments in Churchyard by Path South of South Transept of Church of St Cyriac More images | Q26645734 |
| Two Unidentified Monuments 1 Metre Apart, About 14 Metres South Of Tower Of Church Of St Cyriac | II | About 14 Metres South Of Tower Of Church Of St Cyriac, Church Street | | | 7 January 1987 | ST9169468555; 51°24′57″N 2°07′15″W | | 1198245 | Two Unidentified Monuments 1 Metre Apart, About 14 Metres South Of Tower Of Church Of St Cyriac More images | Q26494197 |
| Unidentified Monument about 13 Metres South West of Tower of Church of St Cyriac | II | Church Street | | | 7 January 1987 | ST9168568557; 51°24′57″N 2°07′15″W | | 1363931 | Unidentified Monument about 13 Metres South West of Tower of Church of St Cyriac More images | Q26645733 |
| Unidentified Monument about 8 Metres South West of Tower of Church of St Cyriac | II | Church Street | | | 7 January 1987 | ST9168768560; 51°24′58″N 2°07′15″W | | 1022152 | Unidentified Monument about 8 Metres South West of Tower of Church of St Cyriac More images | Q26273016 |
| Unidentified Monument in Churchyard about 16 Metres South of Chancel of Church of St Cyriac | II | Church Street | | | 7 January 1987 | ST9171968549; 51°24′57″N 2°07′14″W | | 1283920 | Unidentified Monument in Churchyard about 16 Metres South of Chancel of Church of St Cyriac More images | Q26572736 |
| 1-2 The Tanyard | II | 1-2 The Tanyard, Church Street, SN15 2LB | | | 7 January 1987 | ST9170768618; 51°24′59″N 2°07′14″W | | 1022150 | 1-2 The Tanyard More images | Q26273014 |
| Bridge House | II | 1, Church Street | | | 20 December 1960 | ST9153868570; 51°24′58″N 2°07′23″W | | 1198158 | Bridge House More images | Q26492614 |
| The Corner House | II* | 2, Church Street | | | 20 December 1960 | ST9155468557; 51°24′57″N 2°07′22″W | | 1363927 | The Corner House More images | Q17546510 |
| 3, Church Street | II | 3, Church Street | | | 20 December 1960 | ST9156468560; 51°24′58″N 2°07′22″W | | 1283955 | 3, Church Street More images | Q26572768 |
| 4 and 5, Church Street | II | 4 and 5, Church Street | | | 20 December 1960 | ST9157168565; 51°24′58″N 2°07′21″W | | 1022147 | 4 and 5, Church Street More images | Q26273011 |
| The Sign of the Angel | II* | 6, Church Street | | | 20 December 1960 | ST9158668570; 51°24′58″N 2°07′21″W | | 1198180 | The Sign of the Angel More images | Q17543599 |
| 7, Church Street | II | 7, Church Street | | | 20 December 1960 | ST9160368572; 51°24′58″N 2°07′20″W | | 1363928 | 7, Church Street More images | Q26645730 |
| 8 and 8a, Church Street | II | 8 and 8a, Church Street | | | 20 December 1960 | ST9161868576; 51°24′58″N 2°07′19″W | | 1022148 | 8 and 8a, Church Street More images | Q26273012 |
| 9, Church Street | II | 9, Church Street | | | 20 December 1960 | ST9163168583; 51°24′58″N 2°07′18″W | | 1283966 | 9, Church Street More images | Q26572777 |
| 10, Church Street | II | 10, Church Street | | | 20 December 1960 | ST9163968586; 51°24′58″N 2°07′18″W | | 1022149 | 10, Church Street More images | Q26273013 |
| 11 and 12, Church Street | II | 11 and 12, Church Street | | | 20 December 1960 | ST9164568592; 51°24′59″N 2°07′18″W | | 1198189 | 11 and 12, Church Street More images | Q26494146 |
| The Red House | II | 13, Church Street | | | 20 December 1960 | ST9166368591; 51°24′59″N 2°07′17″W | | 1363929 | The Red House More images | Q26645731 |
| 14-16, Church Street | II* | 14-16, Church Street | | | 20 December 1960 | ST9168668590; 51°24′59″N 2°07′15″W | | 1283936 | 14-16, Church Street More images | Q17546013 |
| 20, Church Street | II | 20, Church Street | | | 20 December 1960 | ST9173968596; 51°24′59″N 2°07′13″W | | 1363930 | 20, Church Street More images | Q26645732 |
| King John's Hunting Lodge | II* | 21, Church Street | | | 20 December 1960 | ST9165868566; 51°24′58″N 2°07′17″W | | 1283925 | King John's Hunting Lodge More images | Q17546007 |
| 23 and 24, Church Street | II | 23 and 24, Church Street | | | 20 December 1960 | ST9161168560; 51°24′58″N 2°07′19″W | | 1198279 | 23 and 24, Church Street More images | Q26494229 |
| 25 and 26, Church Street | II | 25 and 26, Church Street | | | 20 December 1960 | ST9159068555; 51°24′57″N 2°07′20″W | | 1022156 | 25 and 26, Church Street More images | Q26273021 |
| 27, Church Street | II | 27, Church Street | | | 20 December 1960 | ST9157568548; 51°24′57″N 2°07′21″W | | 1198283 | 27, Church Street More images | Q26494233 |
| 28, Church Street | II | 28, Church Street | | | 20 December 1960 | ST9156868543; 51°24′57″N 2°07′21″W | | 1363934 | 28, Church Street More images | Q26645736 |
| Barn to North East of New Farmhouse | II | Corsham Road | | | 7 January 1987 | ST8991069192; 51°25′18″N 2°08′47″W | | 1198287 | Upload Photo | Q26494237 |
| New Farmhouse | II | Corsham Road | | | 7 January 1987 | ST8989369172; 51°25′17″N 2°08′48″W | | 1022157 | Upload Photo | Q26273022 |
| The Lock Up | II | East Street; SN15 2LF | | | 20 December 1960 | ST9164568471; 51°24′55″N 2°07′18″W | | 1022162 | The Lock Up More images | Q26273028 |
| The Village Hall | II | East Street | | | 7 January 1987 | ST9164668497; 51°24′56″N 2°07′17″W | | 1022161 | The Village Hall More images | Q26273027 |
| Tithe Barn At Manor Farm | I | East Street | | | 20 December 1960 | ST9165668456; 51°24′54″N 2°07′17″W | | 1198376 | Tithe Barn At Manor Farm More images | Q17529618 |
| Chamberlain's House | II | 1, East Street | | | 20 December 1960 | ST9164268442; 51°24′54″N 2°07′18″W | | 1022163 | Chamberlain's House More images | Q26273029 |
| 2 and 3, East Street | II | 2 and 3, East Street | | | 20 December 1960 | ST9164068452; 51°24′54″N 2°07′18″W | | 1022164 | 2 and 3, East Street More images | Q26273030 |
| 4 and 5, East Street | II | 4 and 5, East Street | | | 20 December 1960 | ST9163768466; 51°24′55″N 2°07′18″W | | 1022165 | 4 and 5, East Street More images | Q26273031 |
| 6 and 7, East Street | II | 6 and 7, East Street | | | 20 December 1960 | ST9163268478; 51°24′55″N 2°07′18″W | | 1363935 | 6 and 7, East Street More images | Q26645737 |
| 8, East Street | II | 8, East Street | | | 20 December 1960 | ST9163068490; 51°24′55″N 2°07′18″W | | 1283899 | 8, East Street More images | Q26572715 |
| 9-11, East Street | II | 9-11, East Street | | | 20 December 1960 | ST9162668512; 51°24′56″N 2°07′18″W | | 1022166 | 9-11, East Street More images | Q26273032 |
| 12, East Street | II | 12, East Street | | | 20 December 1960 | ST9162468529; 51°24′57″N 2°07′19″W | | 1198310 | 12, East Street More images | Q26494259 |
| 12a, East Street | II | 12a, East Street | | | 20 December 1960 | ST9162268538; 51°24′57″N 2°07′19″W | | 1363936 | 12a, East Street More images | Q26645738 |
| 14, East Street | II | 14, East Street | | | 20 December 1960 | ST9162168549; 51°24′57″N 2°07′19″W | | 1198345 | 14, East Street More images | Q26494294 |
| 15, East Street | II | 15, East Street | | | 7 January 1987 | ST9163468540; 51°24′57″N 2°07′18″W | | 1022158 | 15, East Street More images | Q26273024 |
| 16 and 17, East Street | II | 16 and 17, East Street | | | 20 December 1960 | ST9163868528; 51°24′57″N 2°07′18″W | | 1022159 | 16 and 17, East Street More images | Q26273025 |
| 18, East Street | II | 18, East Street | | | 7 January 1987 | ST9164068514; 51°24′56″N 2°07′18″W | | 1022160 | 18, East Street More images | Q26273026 |
| The Folly | II | 1, Folly Lane | | | 7 January 1987 | ST9153868210; 51°24′46″N 2°07′23″W | | 1022167 | The Folly More images | Q26273033 |
| Barn to East of Tithe Barn at Manor Farm | II | High Street | | | 20 December 1960 | ST9168568433; 51°24′53″N 2°07′15″W | | 1022171 | Barn to East of Tithe Barn at Manor Farm More images | Q26273038 |
| Lacock Primary School | II | High Street | | | 20 December 1960 | ST9157168447; 51°24′54″N 2°07′21″W | | 1022168 | Lacock Primary School More images | Q26273034 |
| Manor Farmhouse | II | High Street | | | 20 December 1960 | ST9170768470; 51°24′55″N 2°07′14″W | | 1363939 | Upload Photo | Q26645740 |
| Outbuilding at Manor Farm to North of Manor Farmhouse | II | High Street | | | 7 January 1987 | ST9171068506; 51°24′56″N 2°07′14″W | | 1198384 | Upload Photo | Q26494316 |
| Outbuilding to Rear of Manor Farmhouse | II | High Street | | | 7 January 1987 | ST9170068479; 51°24′55″N 2°07′15″W | | 1198391 | Upload Photo | Q26494323 |
| The Fox Talbot Museum and Abbey Lodge and Entrance Gates | II | High Street | | | 20 December 1960 | ST9174568405; 51°24′53″N 2°07′12″W | | 1022172 | The Fox Talbot Museum and Abbey Lodge and Entrance Gates More images | Q26273040 |
| The Red Lion Inn | II | High Street | | | 20 December 1960 | ST9165568420; 51°24′53″N 2°07′17″W | | 1198403 | The Red Lion Inn More images | Q26494335 |
| Village Cross 10m S Of Lacock Church Of England Primary School | II* | High Street | | | 20 December 1960 | ST9157768435; 51°24′54″N 2°07′21″W | | 1363937 | Village Cross 10m S Of Lacock Church Of England Primary School More images | Q17546515 |
| 2-5, High Street | II* | 2-5, High Street | | | 20 December 1960 | ST9163368416; 51°24′53″N 2°07′18″W | | 1363940 | 2-5, High Street More images | Q17546521 |
| 6 and 7, High Street | II | 6 and 7, High Street | | | 20 December 1960 | ST9162068415; 51°24′53″N 2°07′19″W | | 1022173 | 6 and 7, High Street More images | Q26273041 |
| 8, High Street | II | 8, High Street | | | 20 December 1960 | ST9160968413; 51°24′53″N 2°07′19″W | | 1198414 | 8, High Street More images | Q26494346 |
| 9, High Street | II | 9, High Street | | | 20 December 1960 | ST9160368412; 51°24′53″N 2°07′20″W | | 1022174 | 9, High Street More images | Q26273042 |
| 10, High Street | II | 10, High Street | | | 20 December 1960 | ST9159468412; 51°24′53″N 2°07′20″W | | 1198419 | 10, High Street More images | Q26494351 |
| 11, High Street | II | 11, High Street | | | 20 December 1960 | ST9158668411; 51°24′53″N 2°07′21″W | | 1363941 | 11, High Street More images | Q26645741 |
| 12a, High Street | II | 12a, High Street | | | 20 December 1960 | ST9156868407; 51°24′53″N 2°07′21″W | | 1022175 | 12a, High Street More images | Q26273044 |
| Lacock Stores | II | 12, High Street | | | 20 December 1960 | ST9158068404; 51°24′53″N 2°07′21″W | | 1198425 | Lacock Stores More images | Q26494356 |
| No 14 (the Porch House), With Cottage And Garage Range To East | II* | 14, High Street | | | 20 December 1960 | ST9155268405; 51°24′53″N 2°07′22″W | | 1198431 | No 14 (the Porch House), With Cottage And Garage Range To East More images | Q17543612 |
| 15-17, High Street | II | 15-17, High Street | | | 20 December 1960 | ST9154968434; 51°24′53″N 2°07′22″W | | 1198351 | 15-17, High Street More images | Q26494299 |
| 18, High Street | II | 18, High Street | | | 7 January 1987 | ST9159168439; 51°24′54″N 2°07′20″W | | 1198363 | 18, High Street More images | Q26494376 |
| 18a, High Street | II | 18a, High Street | | | 20 December 1960 | ST9160168441; 51°24′54″N 2°07′20″W | | 1022169 | 18a, High Street More images | Q26273035 |
| 19, High Street | II | 19, High Street | | | 20 December 1960 | ST9161068440; 51°24′54″N 2°07′19″W | | 1283890 | 19, High Street More images | Q26572706 |
| 20, High Street | II | 20, High Street | | | 20 December 1960 | ST9161868440; 51°24′54″N 2°07′19″W | | 1363938 | 20, High Street More images | Q26645739 |
| 21, High Street | II | 21, High Street | | | 20 December 1960 | ST9162668439; 51°24′54″N 2°07′18″W | | 1198373 | 21, High Street More images | Q26494307 |
| 22, High Street | II | 22, High Street | | | 20 December 1960 | ST9163468440; 51°24′54″N 2°07′18″W | | 1022170 | 22, High Street More images | Q26273036 |
| Entrance Screen, Lodge, East Side Wall And South End Building In Stable Yard At Lackham House | II | Lackham College Of Agriculture | | | 7 January 1987 | ST9262970099; 51°25′47″N 2°06′27″W | | 1022176 | Upload Photo | Q26273045 |
| Garden Balustrading to South of Lackham House | II | Lackham College Of Agriculture | | | 7 January 1987 | ST9228170145; 51°25′49″N 2°06′45″W | | 1198450 | Upload Photo | Q26494481 |
| Lackham House | II | Lackham College Of Agriculture | | | 7 January 1987 | ST9228670177; 51°25′50″N 2°06′44″W | | 1363942 | Upload Photo | Q26645742 |
| Lacock Abbey with Stable Yard | I | Lacock Abbey | | | 20 December 1960 | ST9193268418; 51°24′53″N 2°07′03″W | | 1283853 | Lacock Abbey with Stable Yard More images | Q1148460 |
| Outbuilding to North of Stable Court at Lacock Abbey | II | Lacock Abbey | | | 7 January 1987 | ST9194968496; 51°24′56″N 2°07′02″W | | 1022178 | Upload Photo | Q26273047 |
| Sundial on Terrace South East of Lacock Abbey | II | Lacock Abbey | | | 7 January 1987 | ST9198368370; 51°24′51″N 2°07′00″W | | 1198510 | Sundial on Terrace South East of Lacock Abbey More images | Q26494539 |
| The Columns, North Of Drive To Lacock Abbey | II | Lacock Abbey | | | 7 January 1987 | ST9185168460; 51°24′54″N 2°07′07″W | | 1022177 | The Columns, North Of Drive To Lacock Abbey More images | Q26273046 |
| K6 Telephone Kiosk | II | Melksham Road | | | 7 January 1987 | ST9152368398; 51°24′52″N 2°07′24″W | | 1022206 | K6 Telephone Kiosk More images | Q26273075 |
| White Hall Farmhouse | II | Mons Lane | | | 20 December 1960 | ST9146669059; 51°25′14″N 2°07′27″W | | 1363904 | Upload Photo | Q26645708 |
| Barn Range at Bowden Park Farm | II | Naish Hill, Bowden Park | | | 7 January 1987 | ST9390669067; 51°25′14″N 2°05′21″W | | 1022180 | Upload Photo | Q26273049 |
| Bowden Park Farmhouse | II | Naish Hill, Bowden Park | | | 20 December 1960 | ST9386269063; 51°25′14″N 2°05′23″W | | 1363905 | Upload Photo | Q26645709 |
| Holly Cottage | II | Naish Hill | | | 7 January 1987 | ST9271069059; 51°25′14″N 2°06′22″W | | 1022179 | Upload Photo | Q26273048 |
| The Packhorse Bridge | II | Nethercote Hill | | | 7 January 1987 | ST9167668661; 51°25′01″N 2°07′16″W | | 1022181 | The Packhorse Bridge More images | Q26273050 |
| 1, Nethercote Hill | II | 1, Nethercote Hill | | | 7 January 1987 | ST9169768703; 51°25′02″N 2°07′15″W | | 1022182 | 1, Nethercote Hill More images | Q26273051 |
| Lovers' Walk | II | 1 and 2, Nethercote Hill | | | 7 January 1987 | ST9163868738; 51°25′03″N 2°07′18″W | | 1022185 | Upload Photo | Q26273054 |
| 2, Nethercote Hill | II | 2, Nethercote Hill | | | 7 January 1987 | ST9171268709; 51°25′02″N 2°07′14″W | | 1022183 | 2, Nethercote Hill More images | Q26273052 |
| 3 and 4, Nethercote Hill | II | 3 and 4, Nethercote Hill | | | 7 January 1987 | ST9171768793; 51°25′05″N 2°07′14″W | | 1022184 | Upload Photo | Q26273053 |
| Notton House | II | Notton | | | 19 September 1973 | ST9103769944; 51°25′42″N 2°07′49″W | | 1363908 | Upload Photo | Q26645712 |
| Notton Lodge | II | Notton | | | 20 December 1960 | ST9113669425; 51°25′26″N 2°07′44″W | | 1363906 | Upload Photo | Q26645710 |
| Outbuilding on North Side of Stable Yard at Notton Lodge | II | Notton | | | 7 January 1987 | ST9115369402; 51°25′25″N 2°07′43″W | | 1022186 | Upload Photo | Q26273055 |
| Stable and Coach House to South of No 5 | II | Notton | | | 7 January 1987 | ST9104769571; 51°25′30″N 2°07′49″W | | 1363907 | Upload Photo | Q26645711 |
| Stable Range, Gatepiers And Wall At Notton Lodge | II | Notton | | | 7 January 1987 | ST9116069385; 51°25′24″N 2°07′43″W | | 1283781 | Upload Photo | Q26572604 |
| No 5 (notton Cottage) and Screen Walls to Road | II | 5, Notton | | | 20 December 1960 | ST9107269588; 51°25′31″N 2°07′47″W | | 1022187 | Upload Photo | Q26273056 |
| 7-9, Notton | II | 7-9, Notton | | | 20 December 1960 | ST9105469678; 51°25′34″N 2°07′48″W | | 1198572 | Upload Photo | Q26494598 |
| Arum Cottage | II | 10, Notton | | | 7 January 1987 | ST9101569679; 51°25′34″N 2°07′50″W | | 1022188 | Upload Photo | Q26273057 |
| Little Notton Farmhouse | II | 16, Notton | | | 20 December 1960 | ST9105969814; 51°25′38″N 2°07′48″W | | 1198578 | Upload Photo | Q26494604 |
| 18 and 19, Notton | II | 18 and 19, Notton | | | 7 January 1987 | ST9114669906; 51°25′41″N 2°07′43″W | | 1283791 | Upload Photo | Q26572613 |
| 20 and 21, Notton | II | 20 and 21, Notton | | | 7 January 1987 | ST9117669891; 51°25′41″N 2°07′42″W | | 1022189 | Upload Photo | Q26273058 |
| 26 and 27, Notton | II | 26 and 27, Notton | | | 7 January 1987 | ST9132469906; 51°25′41″N 2°07′34″W | | 1198590 | Upload Photo | Q26494386 |
| Cuckoo Bush Farmhouse | II | Reybridge | | | 7 January 1987 | ST9174369467; 51°25′27″N 2°07′13″W | | 1022193 | Upload Photo | Q26273064 |
| Disused Cottage to South of No 1 | II | Reybridge | | | 7 January 1987 | ST9186469061; 51°25′14″N 2°07′06″W | | 1363909 | Upload Photo | Q26645713 |
| Pigeon House to South of No 8 | II | Reybridge | | | 7 January 1987 | ST9187969226; 51°25′19″N 2°07′05″W | | 1022192 | Upload Photo | Q26273063 |
| Rey Bridge | II | Reybridge | | | 20 December 1960 | ST9191569129; 51°25′16″N 2°07′04″W | | 1022190 | Upload Photo | Q26273060 |
| Rey Mill House | II | Reybridge | | | 7 January 1987 | ST9218769382; 51°25′24″N 2°06′50″W | | 1198630 | Upload Photo | Q26494424 |
| Reybridge House | II | Reybridge | | | 7 January 1987 | ST9224569084; 51°25′15″N 2°06′46″W | | 1363911 | Upload Photo | Q26645715 |
| 1, Reybridge | II | 1, Reybridge | | | 20 December 1960 | ST9187269081; 51°25′14″N 2°07′06″W | | 1283761 | Upload Photo | Q26572586 |
| 4, Reybridge | II | 4, Reybridge | | | 20 December 1960 | ST9189569082; 51°25′14″N 2°07′05″W | | 1022191 | Upload Photo | Q26273062 |
| 5 and 6, Reybridge | II | 5 and 6, Reybridge | | | 7 January 1987 | ST9188369126; 51°25′16″N 2°07′05″W | | 1283762 | Upload Photo | Q26572587 |
| Hill Cottage | II | 7, Reybridge | | | 7 January 1987 | ST9189069184; 51°25′18″N 2°07′05″W | | 1363910 | Upload Photo | Q26645714 |
| 8, Reybridge | II | 8, Reybridge | | | 7 January 1987 | ST9188869256; 51°25′20″N 2°07′05″W | | 1198614 | Upload Photo | Q26494410 |
| 11, Reybridge | II | 11, Reybridge | | | 7 January 1987 | ST9188969326; 51°25′22″N 2°07′05″W | | 1198623 | Upload Photo | Q26494418 |
| 31-33, Reybridge | II | 31-33, Reybridge | | | 7 January 1987 | ST9233769029; 51°25′13″N 2°06′42″W | | 1198633 | Upload Photo | Q26494426 |
| Mead Farmhouse | II | The Wharf | | | 7 January 1987 | ST9254668029; 51°24′40″N 2°06′31″W | | 1283721 | Upload Photo | Q26572552 |
| Strode House | II | The Wharf | | | 7 January 1987 | ST9250467960; 51°24′38″N 2°06′33″W | | 1022200 | Upload Photo | Q26273070 |
| Wharf Cottage | II | The Wharf | | | 7 January 1987 | ST9258568005; 51°24′40″N 2°06′29″W | | 1363916 | Upload Photo | Q26645720 |
| Saddler's Green | II | 7, The Wharf | | | 7 January 1987 | ST9254268094; 51°24′43″N 2°06′31″W | | 1283722 | Upload Photo | Q26572553 |
| The Old Coaching House | II | 8, The Wharf | | | 7 January 1987 | ST9253668151; 51°24′44″N 2°06′31″W | | 1022201 | Upload Photo | Q26273071 |
| Notton War Memorial | II | West Street, Melksham Road, SN15 2LH | | | 7 November 2017 | ST9148368348; 51°24′51″N 2°07′26″W | | 1451057 | Notton War Memorial More images | Q66479123 |
| Stable to Cantax House, To Rear Of Nos 6 and 7 | II | West Street | | | 7 January 1987 | ST9149268518; 51°24′56″N 2°07′25″W | | 1022199 | Upload Photo | Q26273069 |
| The George Inn | II | West Street | | | 20 December 1960 | ST9151268484; 51°24′55″N 2°07′24″W | | 1022198 | The George Inn More images | Q26273068 |
| The War Memorial | II | West Street | | | 7 January 1987 | ST9152368426; 51°24′53″N 2°07′24″W | | 1283747 | The War Memorial More images | Q26572574 |
| 1, West Street | II | 1, West Street | | | 20 December 1960 | ST9152068414; 51°24′53″N 2°07′24″W | | 1022197 | 1, West Street More images | Q26273067 |
| 2, West Street | II | 2, West Street | | | 20 December 1960 | ST9151968437; 51°24′54″N 2°07′24″W | | 1363914 | Upload Photo | Q26645718 |
| 3, West Street | II | 3, West Street | | | 20 December 1960 | ST9151668460; 51°24′54″N 2°07′24″W | | 1198666 | 3, West Street More images | Q26494637 |
| 5, West Street | II | 5, West Street | | | 20 December 1960 | ST9151268496; 51°24′55″N 2°07′24″W | | 1363915 | 5, West Street More images | Q26645719 |
| 6 and 7, West Street | II | 6 and 7, West Street | | | 20 December 1960 | ST9151368508; 51°24′56″N 2°07′24″W | | 1283719 | 6 and 7, West Street More images | Q26572550 |
| 8 and 9, West Street | II | 8 and 9, West Street | | | 20 December 1960 | ST9155568528; 51°24′57″N 2°07′22″W | | 1022195 | 8 and 9, West Street More images | Q26273065 |
| 10, West Street | II | 10, West Street | | | 20 December 1960 | ST9154868518; 51°24′56″N 2°07′23″W | | 1198648 | 10, West Street More images | Q26494619 |
| 11, West Street | II | 11, West Street | | | 20 December 1960 | ST9154168507; 51°24′56″N 2°07′23″W | | 1022196 | 11, West Street More images | Q26273066 |
| 12 and 12a, West Street | II | 12 and 12a, West Street | | | 20 December 1960 | ST9153668492; 51°24′55″N 2°07′23″W | | 1198653 | 12 and 12a, West Street More images | Q26494624 |
| No 14 (Grove House) and Barn Attached | II | 14, West Street | | | 20 December 1960 | ST9155268464; 51°24′54″N 2°07′22″W | | 1363913 | No 14 (Grove House) and Barn Attached More images | Q26645717 |
| 15, West Street | II | 15, West Street | | | 20 December 1960 | ST9154768441; 51°24′54″N 2°07′23″W | | 1283744 | 15, West Street More images | Q26572571 |
| Barn at Catridge Farm | II | Wick Lane, Catridge Farm | | | 7 January 1987 | ST8987267588; 51°24′26″N 2°08′49″W | | 1283732 | Upload Photo | Q26572561 |
| Barn at Wick Farm | II* | Wick Lane | | | 20 December 1960 | ST9022167894; 51°24′36″N 2°08′31″W | | 1022204 | Upload Photo | Q17534139 |
| Catridge Farmhouse | II | Wick Lane, Catridge Farm | | | 7 January 1987 | ST8989467604; 51°24′27″N 2°08′48″W | | 1022205 | Upload Photo | Q26273074 |
| Cottage Adjacent to No 4 Folly Lane | II | Wick Lane | | | 7 January 1987 | ST9065368557; 51°24′57″N 2°08′09″W | | 1283724 | Upload Photo | Q26572555 |
| Little Wick Wick Farmhouse | II | Wick Lane | | | 20 December 1960 | ST9022367924; 51°24′37″N 2°08′31″W | | 1022203 | Upload Photo | Q26273073 |
| Stable and Barn Range to South West of Wick Farmhouse | II | Wick Lane | | | 7 January 1987 | ST9020467876; 51°24′35″N 2°08′32″W | | 1198716 | Upload Photo | Q26494684 |
| Thatch Cottage | II | Wick Lane | | | 7 January 1987 | ST9062168533; 51°24′57″N 2°08′11″W | | 1022202 | Upload Photo | Q26273072 |
| Granary to South of Showell Farmhouse | II | A350 | | | 7 January 1987 | ST9090970926; 51°26′14″N 2°07′56″W | | 1363926 | Upload Photo | Q26645729 |
| Home Park | II | | | | 7 January 1987 | ST9193769938; 51°25′42″N 2°07′03″W | | 1363943 | Upload Photo | Q26645743 |
| Lacock Bridge | II* | Approximately 400m South-east Of Lacock Abbey | | | 20 December 1960 | ST9232568089; 51°24′42″N 2°06′42″W | | 1022127 | Lacock Bridge More images | Q17534092 |

== See also ==
- Grade I listed buildings in Wiltshire
- Grade II* listed buildings in Wiltshire

== Sources ==
- Orbach, Julian; Pevsner, Nikolaus; Cherry, Bridget (2021), Wiltshire, The Buildings of England, New Haven and London: Yale University Press, ISBN 978-0-300-25120-3
