= China Tang =

Chinese restaurant in London, England

Coordinates: 51°30′26.8″N 0°9′10.2″W

- Interactive map of China Tang

Restaurant information
- Established: 2005
- Location: London, United Kingdom

China Tang is a Chinese restaurant located at 53 Park Lane in London, which was owned by entrepreneur David Tang, until his death in 2017. The restaurant was opened in 2005. It is located within the Dorchester Hotel and the nearest London Underground station to the restaurant is Hyde Park Corner.

== Overview ==
The restaurant is designed with an Art Deco style lounge bar reminiscent of 1930s Shanghai. People have been seen there, including Kate Moss and former British Prime Minister Tony Blair. Charity events have been hosted at the restaurant, as well as fundraising events for the Television Trust for the Environment.

The restaurant has been ranked among the top 29 "must-try" Chinese restaurants in London by Squaremeal, with model Kate Moss naming it among the best restaurants in the world in 2023.

== See also ==
- List of Chinese restaurants
