= The Dorchester =

Hotel in London

Coordinates: 51°30′26″N 0°09′09″W

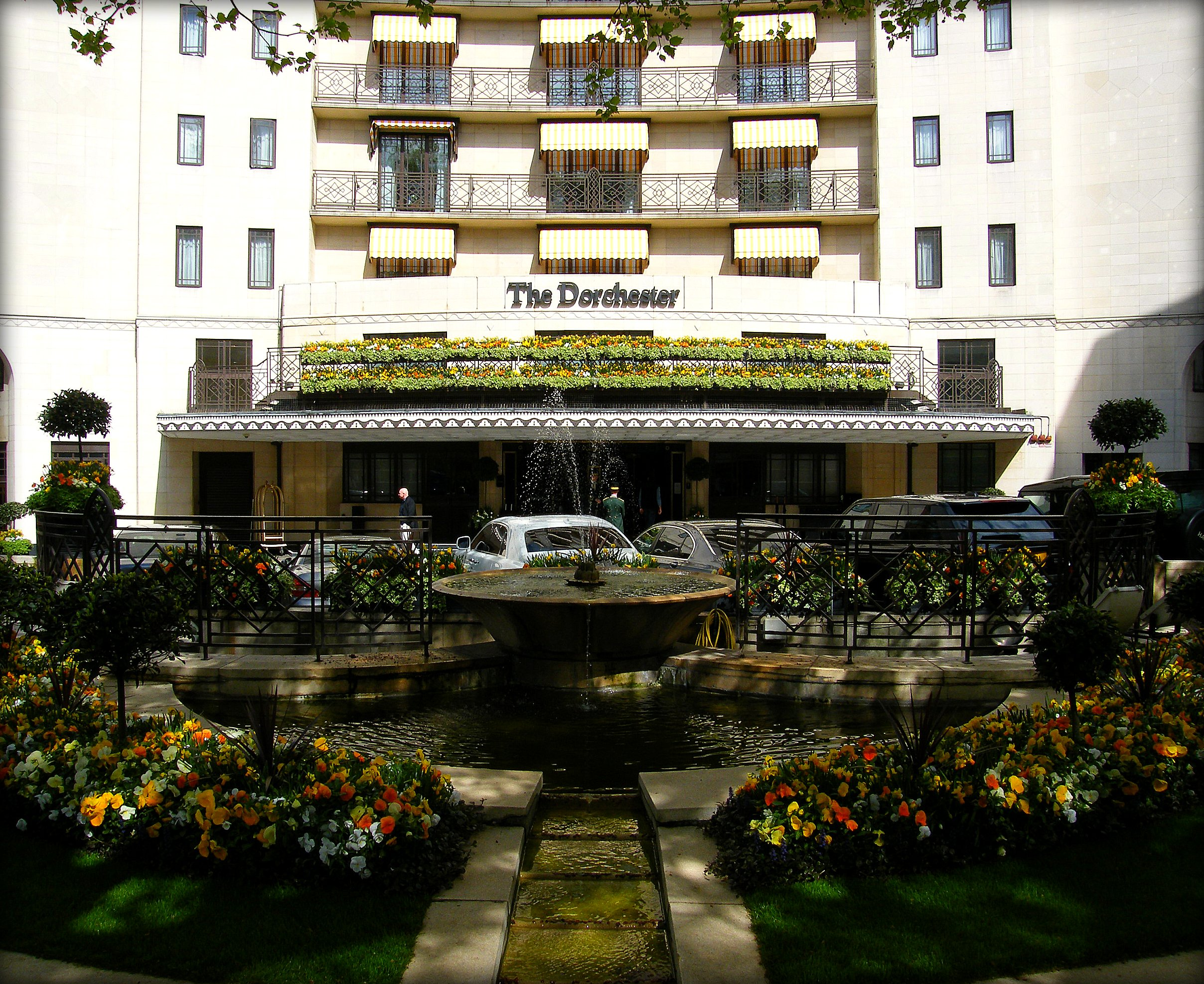

General information
- Type: Luxury hotel
- Location: Mayfair, London, England
- Opened: 18 April 1931
- Client: Sir Francis Towle
- Owner: Brunei Investment Agency
- Operator: Dorchester Collection

Design and construction
- Architects: Owen Williams & William Curtis Green
- Main contractor: Sir Robert McAlpine

Other information
- Number of rooms: 250
- Number of suites: 49

Website
- Official website

The Dorchester is a five-star hotel on Park Lane and Deanery Street in Westminster, Greater London, England, to the east of Hyde Park, one of the world's most prestigious hotels. It opened on 18 April 1931, and still retains its 1930s furnishings and ambiance, despite later alterations.

Throughout its history, the hotel has been associated with the rich and famous. During the 1930s, it became known as a haunt of writers and artists such as poet Cecil Day-Lewis, novelist Somerset Maugham, and the painter Alfred Munnings. It has held prestigious literary gatherings, such as the "Foyles Literary Luncheons", an event the hotel still hosts today. During the Second World War, the strength of its construction gave the hotel the reputation of being one of London's safest buildings, and some politicians and military leaders chose it as their London residence. Princess Elizabeth was at the Dorchester the day before her engagement to Philip Mountbatten was announced on 10 July 1947. The hotel has long been popular with film actors, models, and rock stars; Elizabeth Taylor and Richard Burton often stayed at it during the 1960s and 1970s. It became a Grade II listed building in January 1981 and in 1985 was bought by the Sultan of Brunei. It now belongs to the Dorchester Collection, owned by the Brunei Investment Agency.

In the 1950s, the stage set designer Oliver Messel made changes to the interior of the hotel. Between 1988 and 1990, it was completely renovated at a cost of $100 million by Bob Lush of the Richmond Design Group.

Today, the Dorchester has five restaurants: The Grill, Alain Ducasse, The Spatisserie, The Promenade, and China Tang. Alain Ducasse's restaurant is one of the UK's five 3-Michelin-starred restaurants. Afternoon tea, a tradition at the hotel since it opened in 1931, is served every day of the week at five in the afternoon in The Promenade and the Spatisserie. Harry Craddock, a well-known barman in the 1930s, invented the "Dorchester of London" cocktail here at the Dorchester Bar. A well-lit plane tree stands in the front garden and was named as one of the Great Trees of London by the London Tree Forum and Countryside Commission in 1997.

== History ==
=== Background ===
The site was originally part of the Manor of Hyde, which was given by William the Conqueror to Geoffrey de Mandeville. Joseph Damer acquired it in the 18th century, and a large house was constructed in 1751. It was named Dorchester House in 1792, after Damer became the Earl of Dorchester. In the early 19th century it became known as Hertford House after it was purchased by Francis Seymour-Conway, the 3rd Marquess of Hertford, and alterations were made to it. Following the death of Hertford, it was rebuilt as a new Dorchester House for the use of Captain Robert Stayner Holford.

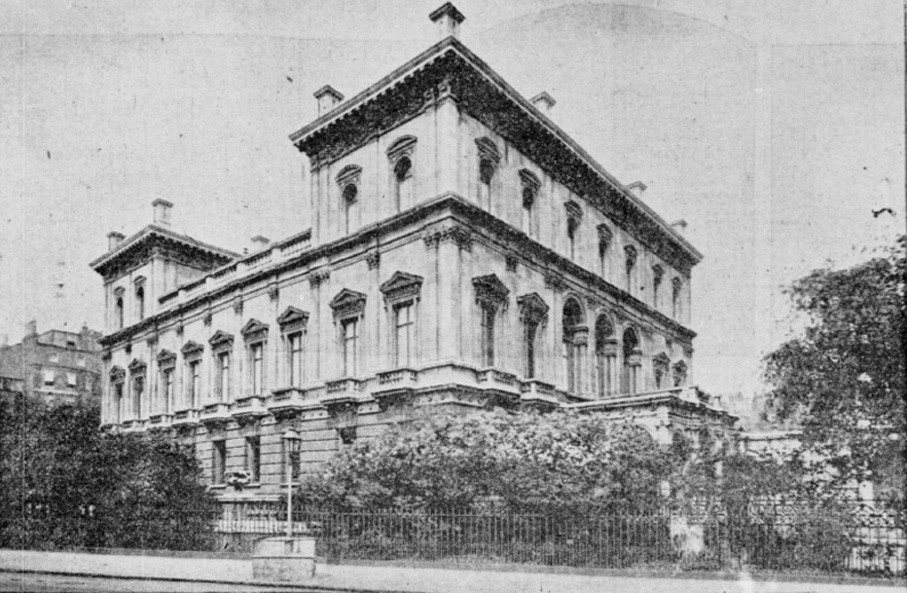
Dorchester House, pictured in 1905, before its demolition in 1929

The background to the development of the Dorchester Hotel is complicated.

Sir George Holford died in 1926. His heir was his nephew Edmund Parker, 4th Earl of Morley, who had inherited large debts from his father and grandfather. He immediately put his Holford inheritance of both Dorchester House and Westonbirt House up for sale.

Sir Francis Towle, managing director of Gordon Hotels, saw Dorchester House as an ideal site for a luxury hotel, but his company would not take the project on. However, Prudential Insurance offered to put up £625,000, and Towle approached Malcolm McAlpine, a partner in the building company Sir Robert McAlpine & Sons, civil engineering contractors, offering him the construction contract if McAlpine's would match the Gordon Hotels' contribution of £315,000. This was agreed. Gordon Hotels, the Prudential, and McAlpine planned to form a new company to build and own the new hotel, but the Prudential added a condition to its funding: it would put up £350,000, the cost of buying the house, but no more than that until building work to the value of £200,000 had been completed. McAlpine's refused to agree to this, and the Prudential withdrew; McAlpine's immediately agreed to step into the shoes of the Prudential, but that meant putting nearly a million pounds into the venture, which had a construction contract worth an estimated £900,000.

The Dorchester House Syndicate Ltd was incorporated in August 1929, with exactly half the shares owned by Sir Robert McAlpine & Sons, 40 per cent by Gordon Hotels, and 10 percent by Towle himself. McAlpine's bought the property on behalf of the new company, and Dorchester House was quickly demolished.

The BBC had also shown an interest in purchasing the property and had almost done so prior to the McAlpine acquisition, but instead it turned its attention to Foley House. The purchase and destruction of Dorchester House was part of significant redevelopment which took place on Park Lane around the same time; it followed soon after the gutting of Grosvenor House and the building of the Grosvenor House Hotel, which had been completed in 1929.

=== Construction ===
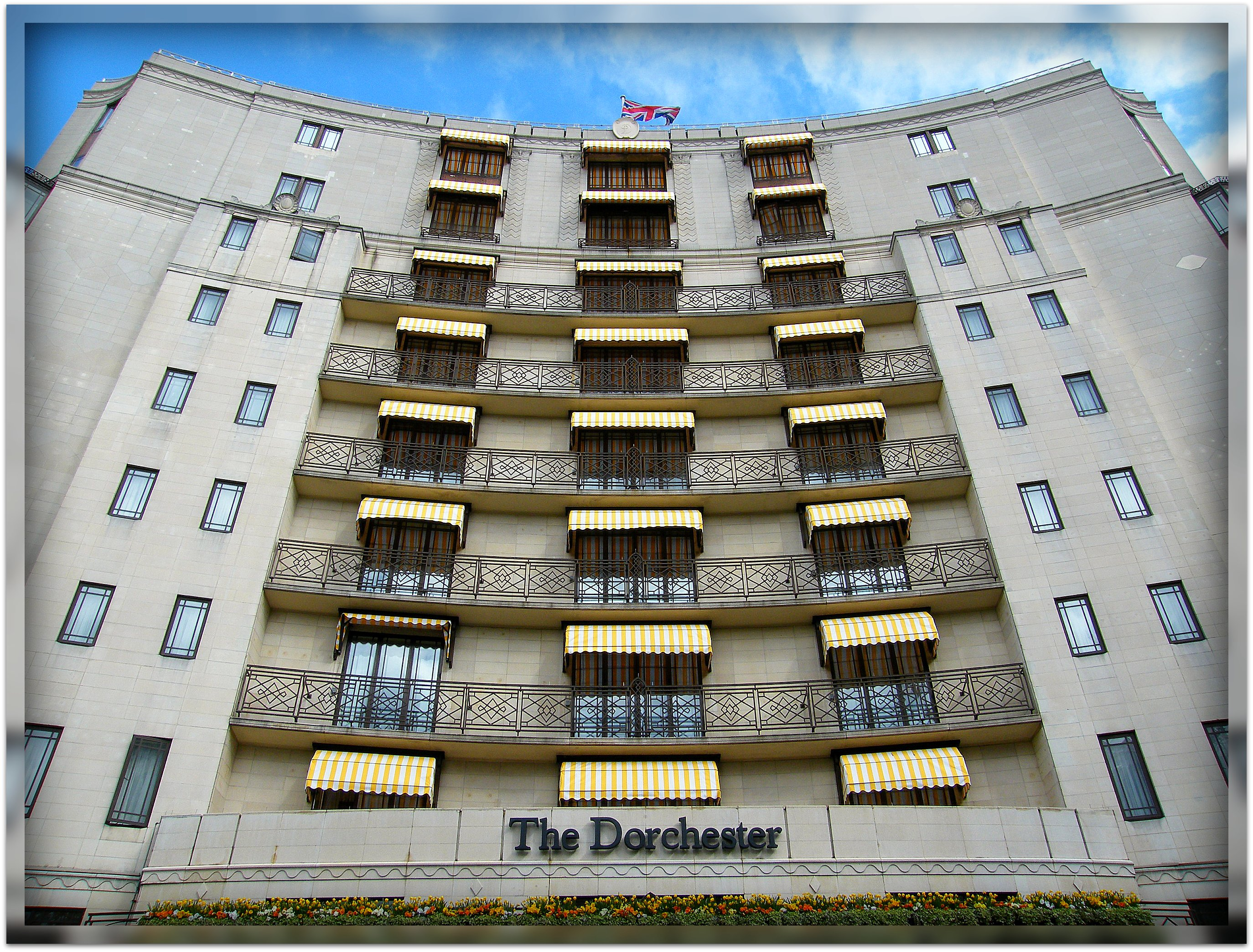
The exterior

Sir Owen Williams was commissioned to design the new hotel, using reinforced concrete to allow the creation of large internal spaces without support pillars, but he abandoned the project in February 1930 and was replaced with William Curtis Green. James Maude Richards, hired by Williams, served as an architectural assistant within the all-engineer staff. Percy Morley Horder, consulting architect to Gordon's Hotels, had not been consulted during the design process and, after seeing the plan, resigned from the project, remarking to The Observer that the design was ill-suited for the location, assuming the concrete was to be left unpainted, and that the insulation would be minimal. Some 40,000 tonnes of earth were excavated to make room for the hotel's extensive basement which is one-third of the size of the hotel above the surface. The upper eight floors were erected in just 10 weeks, supported on a massive 3 feet (0.91 m) thick reinforced concrete deck that forms the roof of the first floor. With the development of the Dorchester, concerns were raised that Park Lane would soon look like New York City's Fifth Avenue.

=== 1931–1945 ===
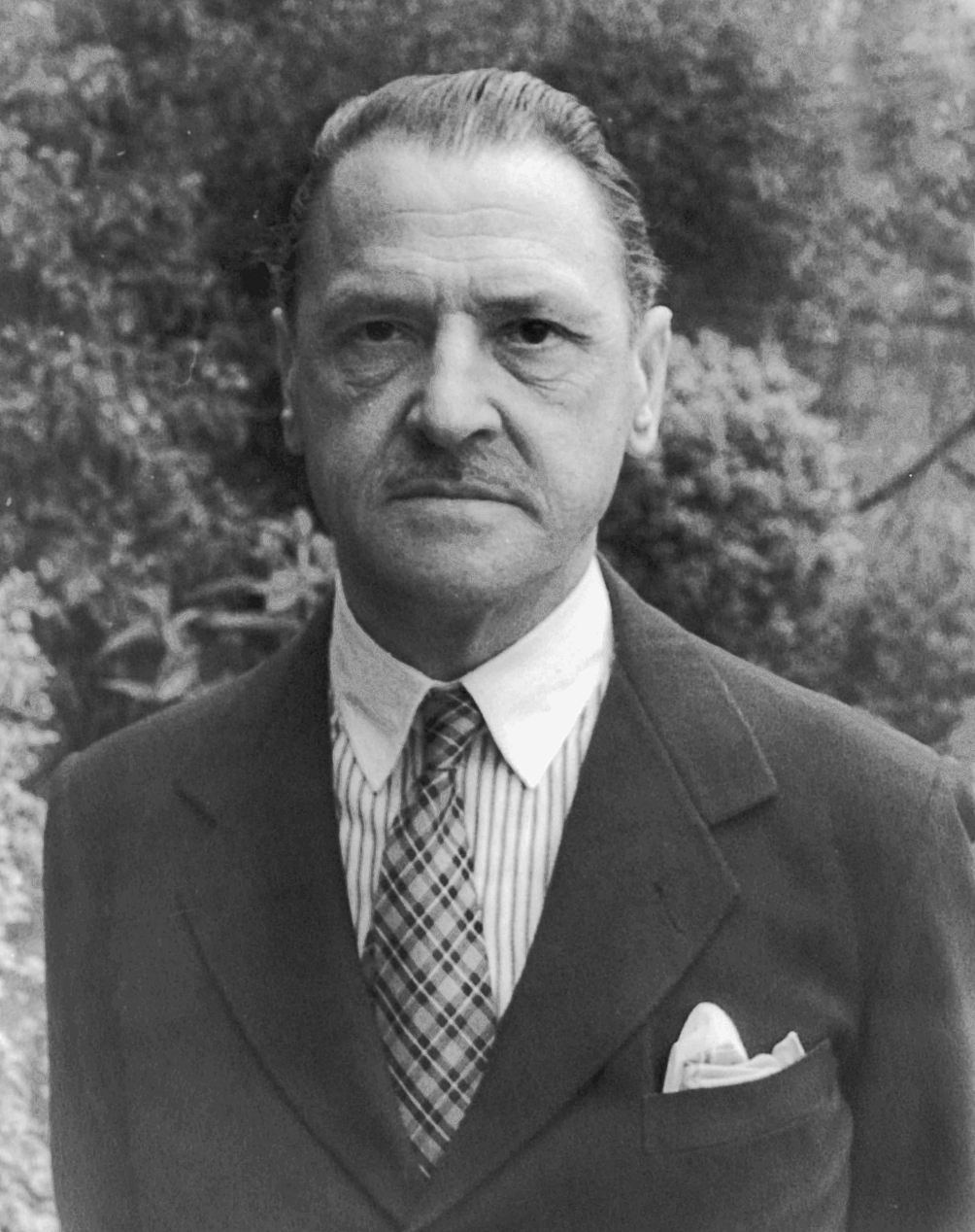
Somerset Maugham

On Saturday 28 March 1931, Queen Mary was given a tour of the new Dorchester Hotel by Sir Francis Towle, the managing director of Gordon Hotels. The hotel was launched by Lady Astor at a grand luncheon on Saturday 18 April, with a speech by J. H. Thomas, Secretary of State for Dominion Affairs. It opened for business on Monday 20 April and on Tuesday 21 April this was celebrated by a "Lace Ball" in the ballroom.

The Dorchester quickly gained a reputation as a luxury hotel. During the 1930s it became known as a haunt of numerous writers and artists such as poet Cecil Day-Lewis, novelist Somerset Maugham, and the painter Sir Alfred Munnings. There were prestigious literary gatherings, including "Foyles Literary Luncheons", an event the hotel still hosts. Shortly after the opening, Sir Percival David, a leading admirer of Chinese porcelain, moved his growing collection from the Mayfair Hotel to the Dorchester, where he kept it in his suites for many years. Danny Kaye began appearing in cabaret at the hotel in the 1930s, initially earning £50 a week. Many blues and jazz artists appeared at the hotel, including Alberta Hunter and the Jack Jackson Orchestra. In 1934, Hunter was the vocalist on Jackson's recordings of Noël Coward's "I Travel Alone" and Cole Porter's "Miss Otis Regrets" at the hotel; both Coward and Porter were fans. It also became a rendezvous for many businessmen; it was at the Dorchester that BP formed a joint Collaborate Committee with ICI in 1943.

During the Second World War, the strength of its construction gave the hotel the reputation of being one of London's safest buildings. On its opening, Sir Malcolm McAlpine declared it to be "bomb-proof, earthquake-proof and fireproof," and the only damage inflicted on the building by the Luftwaffe during the war was several broken windows. Some felt the communal air-raid shelter in the basement to be insufficiently exclusive and retreated to the hotel's underground gymnasium and Victorian-style Turkish baths, which had been converted into a shelter by Victor Cazalet. Its wartime clientele included Lord Halifax (Foreign Minister), Oliver Stanley (Minister for War), Air Chief Marshal Sir Charles Portal (Chief of the Air Staff), Duff Cooper (with his wife Lady Diana Cooper), Oliver Lyttleton (President of the Board of Trade) and Duncan Sandys (Financial Secretary to the War Office). Halifax and his wife took eight rooms as well as a chapel in the hotel, and when possible he enjoyed trysts with his mistress, Alexandra "Baba" Metcalfe, who was also staying in the hotel and concurrently having an affair with Dino Grandi, Mussolini's representative Italian ambassador in London.

General Dwight D. Eisenhower took a suite on the first floor (now the Eisenhower Suite) in 1942 after having previously stayed at Claridge's, and in 1944 he made it his headquarters; Kay Summersby, his chauffeur and purported mistress, and Roosevelt's representative Averell Harriman also stayed there thanks to its reputation as a safe haven. During a dinner party which Harriman attended in the Dorchester, the bombing was so intense that guests came down to join him there as it was safer than in the upper-floor rooms. Bostonian Sherry Mangan of Time was one of several American correspondents who stayed at the hotel during the war, meeting the Trotskyist Sam Gordon in 1944, who asked if the Dorchester was safe from air raids, to which Mangan assured him that "every fifth columnist in London is staying here". Other hotel guests reflected the directors' wide-ranging political beliefs: it was at once the base for the Zionist movement's leaders, including Chaim Weizmann, as well as a group of upper-class British anti-Semites, including Margaret Greville. According to Cecil Beaton the clientele was a "mixed brew"; to its wartime chronicler, it was "a building in which the respectable and the dubious mixed by the thousand, knocking back cocktails and indulging in careless talk". In March 1945, Ernest Hemingway and Time correspondent and lover Mary Welsh stayed at the Dorchester, where they were entertained by Emerald, Lady Cunard, who had a three-room suite on the seventh floor.

=== Post-war ===
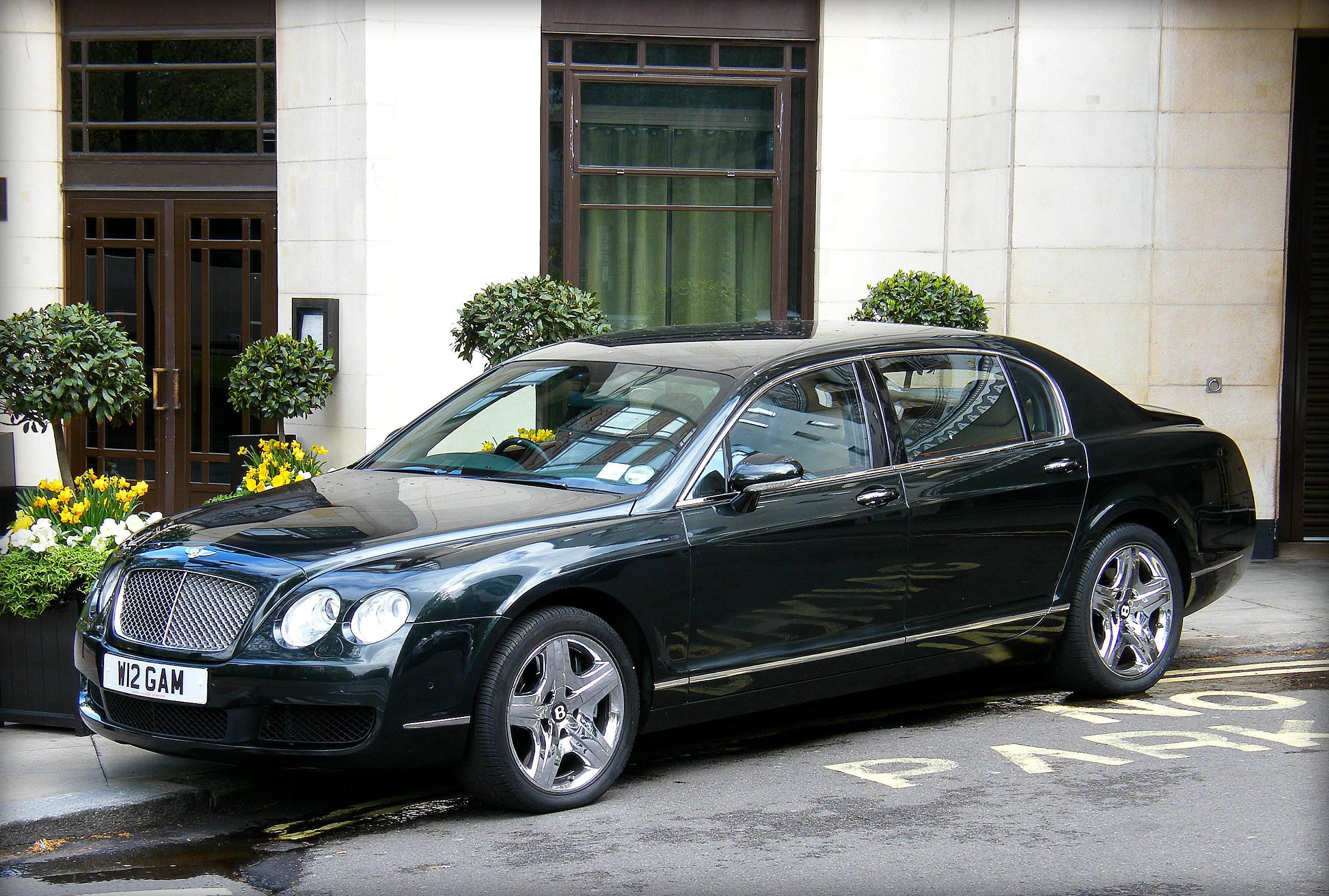
A black Bentley Continental Flying Spur belonging to the Dorchester in 2010

In 1949, the 150th anniversary of Alexander Pushkin's birth was organised at the hotel by the Society of Cultural Relations with the USSR, attended by the Soviet chargé d'affaires, the Polish ambassador, the Romanian minister, and Cecil Day-Lewis, raising MI5's suspicions that he still had communist sympathies, a contention he later denounced. The Dorchester became one of the most high-profile hotels in London for actors, entertainers, and royalty, and the ballroom and banqueting rooms became known for hosting events, particularly with charities. Diners at the Dorchester included Cyril Connolly, T. S. Eliot, Harold Nicolson, Edith Sitwell, Ralph Richardson, Elizabeth Taylor, Alfred Hitchcock, and Barbra Streisand. Queen Elizabeth II attended the Dorchester when she was a princess on the day prior to the announcement of her engagement to Philip Mountbatten on 10 July 1947. Philip also held his stag night party at the hotel, which has been documented in a plaque. Comedian Kenneth Horne died of a heart attack on stage at the Dorchester on 14 February 1969, while hosting the annual Guild of Television Producers' and Directors' Awards ceremony.

When Said bin Taimur of Oman was ousted in a coup in July 1970 and replaced with his son Qaboos bin Said, he was sent in exile and lived at the Dorchester until his death in 1972. The McAlpine family owned the hotel until 1977 when they sold it to a consortium of businessmen from the Middle East headed by the Sultan of Brunei. On 3 June 1982, Shlomo Argov, the Israeli ambassador to the United Kingdom was shot and seriously injured in an assassination attempt as he left the Dorchester. The attack was the immediate cause for the 1982 Lebanon War.

In 1985, the hotel was purchased by the Sultan of Brunei. The hotel is currently owned by the Dorchester Collection, which in turn is owned by the Brunei Investment Agency (BIA), an arm of the Ministry of Finance of Brunei. The Dorchester Collection owns luxury hotels in the United Kingdom, the United States, France, Switzerland and Italy. In 1988, the hotel closed for two years for a major refurbishment.

In June 1998 the brother of the Sultan of Brunei, Prince Jefri Bolkiah, was sued by his former business partners in a case that was settled out of court. During the case the Manoukians claimed that Prince Jefri kept 40 prostitutes at a time at the Dorchester. In 1999, the hotel hosted the first ever Pride of Britain Awards. In March 2002, a robbery took place in the lobby of the hotel when thieves wearing ski masks smashed the jewellery cabinets with a sledgehammer and took off with jewels. The Dorchester celebrated its 80th anniversary in 2011. To mark the event, the charity 'Trees for Cities' planted eighty 'future great trees' around the capital.

From about 1985 to 2018, the hotel hosted the annual Presidents Club charity dinner, a "mainstay of London's social calendar". The charity disbanded in 2018 after reports that hired hostesses had been sexually harassed and assaulted by the all-male guests.

== Architecture ==
=== Exterior ===
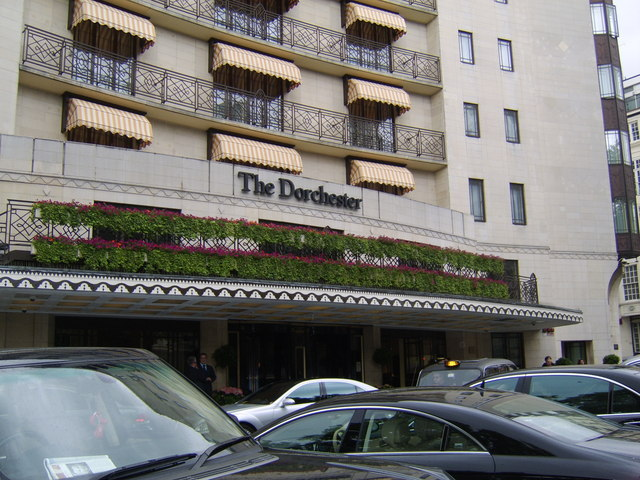
The exterior facade of the Dorchester

The architectural style adopted by William Curtis Green, largely based on Owen William's design, was a departure from the Neoclassical with its reinforced concrete covered over with terrazzo slabs. British Modernists were disappointed with the result, describing Green's adaptation as, "a genteel period piece which looks the compromise it is". In comparison to some of the other hotels in London such as the Lanesborough, the building's exterior is unremarkable. It is eight storeys high aside from the ground floor, with the central bay containing three windows on each floor. Christopher Matthew has stated that he thinks of the Dorchester as a "rather American hotel", not only because of the strong association with American actors such as Elizabeth Taylor, but because the sweeping 1930s facade reminded him of many of those which appeared in American film musicals. However, he notes that the hotel still remains "very much an English hotel". The hotel became a Grade II listed building in January 1981.

=== Interior ===
The interior displays a "subtle amalgam of styles", testament to the number of different designers involved over the years, including William Curtis Green, Oliver Frederick Ford, Alberto Pinto and Oliver Messel. Kim Einhorn believes that this fusion of style was achieved tastefully and has remarked that the Dorchester Hotel is "a good example of somewhere it may be better to add decor rather than completely re-invent". DK Eyewitness describes the Dorchester as "the epitome of the glamorous luxury hotel, with an outrageously lavish lobby and a star-studded history".

Gold leaf and marble remain distinct features of the public rooms of the hotel, including the restaurants, with features more reminiscent of an English country house than a hotel. Considerable efforts to make the rooms soundproof at the Dorchester were made from the outset; the exterior walls were faced with cork, and the floors and ceilings of the bedrooms and suites were lined with compressed seaweed. Following renovation, the hotel was fitted with double glazing, and triple glazing on the Park Lane side to further improve soundproofing.

In the 1950s, stage set designer Oliver Messel made significant changes to the interior of the hotel. He incorporated aspects of stage design into the hotel interior, and designed the lavish apartments on the 7th and 8th floors. As Country Life documented, Messel's rooms at the hotel "represents a rare glimpse into the world of mid-20th-century interior design", in which he drew upon his skills as a theatre designer to fill his rooms with "tricks of space and light, colour and period reference". Today one of the suites is named after him, the Oliver Messel Suite, designed in the Georgian country house style. Messel made the changes on the Deanery Side of the building in 1952–3. Oliver Frederick Ford served as consultant designer from 1962, decorating both the Stanhope Suite and the Orchid Room, a corner of which was completely re-built and decorated in the English rococo style. He also remodelled the white, gold, and green entrance hall. The current dark green staff uniform of The Dorchester was designed in 1980 and is also attributed to Ford.

Between 1988 and 1990, the hotel was completely renovated by Bob Lush of the Richmond Design Group at a cost of $100 million. Liberace's piano sits in the lobby.

As of 2012, the Dorchester has 250 rooms and 49 suites. In the rooms, specially made Irish linen sheets cover the four poster beds, with cherry wood furnishings. The bath tubs, cited as "probably the deepest in London", are made of Italian marble in the Art Deco style. All rooms in the hotel either provide views of Hyde Park or of its landscaped terraces. During the major renovation of 2002, all rooms and suites were fitted with modern telecommunication systems. The hotel has its own floristry team who are responsible for regularly updating the flowers on display in the hotel and providing their services for weddings and special occasions.

In 2023 the Dorchester revealed extensive refurbishments, including guestrooms and suites designed by Pierre-Yves Rochon and the renamed Vesper Bar by Martin Brudnizki.

=== Restaurants ===
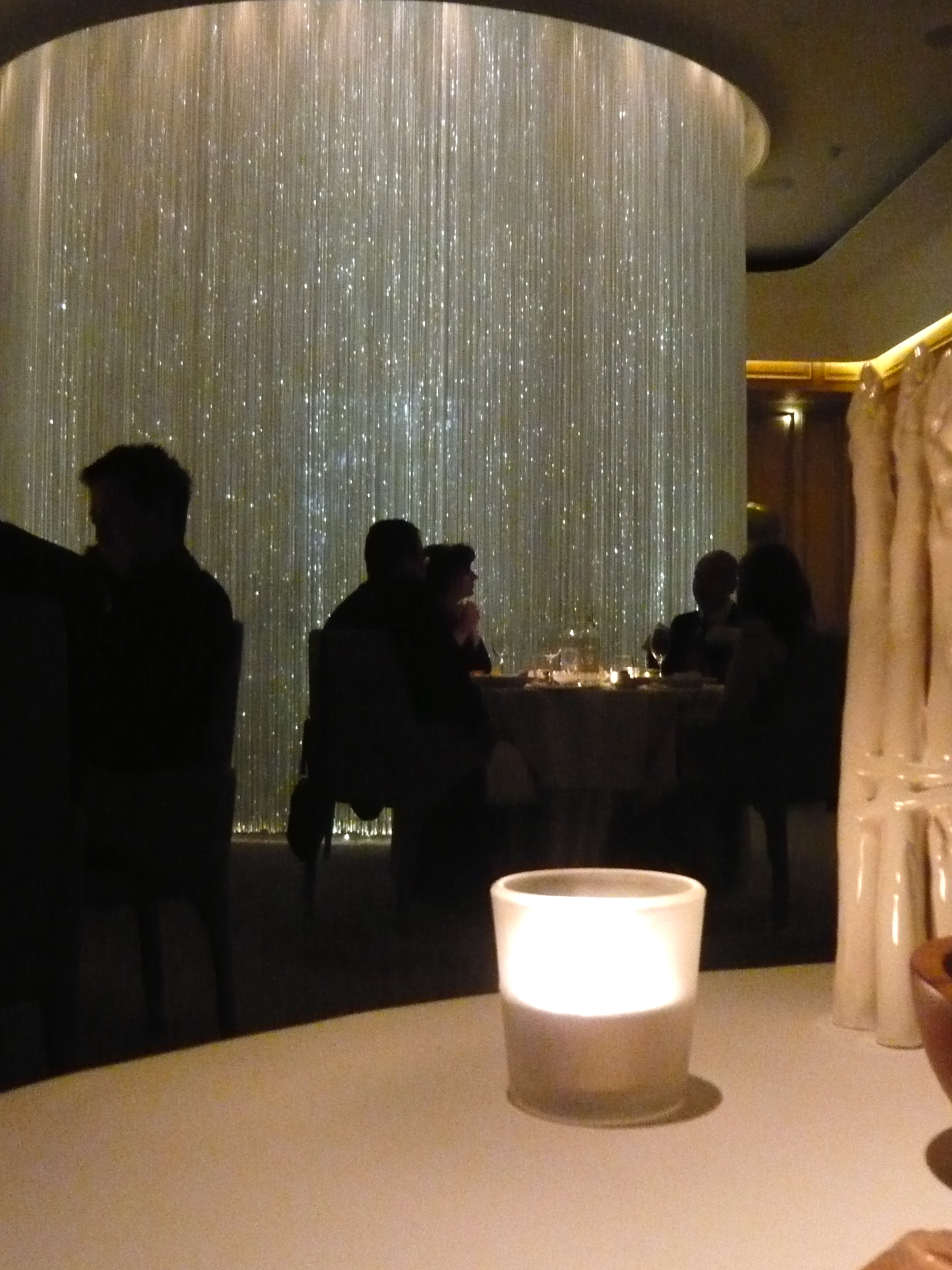
The Table Lumière at Alain Ducasse at the Dorchester

The Dorchester has five restaurants: The Grill, Alain Ducasse, The Spatisserie, The Promenade, and China Tang, and three bars, two of which are in the last two restaurants. Employing 90 full-time chefs, the hotel has long had a reputation for its cuisine, and chefs such as Jean Baptiste Virlogeux, Eugene Kaufeler, Willi Elsener and Anton Mosimann have all run restaurants there. Mosimann ran the Maitre Chef des Cuisines at the Dorchester for 13 years. Virlogeux, head chef during the Second World War, had to succumb to rationing and a national maximum-price restriction of five shillings for a three-course meal.

Alain Ducasse's restaurant, Alain Ducasse at the Dorchester, holds three Michelin stars. When refurbished along with other parts of the hotel in 2007, the redesign purposefully retained its 1940s influence. The restaurant serves contemporary French cuisine using seasonal French and British ingredients. The restaurant features a special table for up to six diners called the "Table Lumière", lit by 4500 fibre optic lights. It is surrounded by a thin white curtain which allows diners at the table to view out into the restaurant but prevents other diners from viewing in.

The Grill restaurant, which serves British cuisine, is decorated in a Moorish theme, attributed to King Alfonso's influence during his time in London in exile in the 1930s. The cream-painted walls feature gilded gratings and mirrored arches and display a Flemish tapestry. The ceilings are ornate, featuring gold leaves and brass chandeliers, and the room also features deep red riveted leather chairs and deep red curtains. According to restaurant critic Jay Rayner, "when you drill down on the menu it's what the faded gentry used to call high tea. It's nursery food at stupid prices."

The Promenade was refurbished in 1990 by Leslie Wright with a gilded ceiling and reliefs and brass lanterns, and was altered again in 2005 by Thierry Despont, who fitted it with an oval leather bar; it forms the grand entrance and has a length which is equal to that of Nelson's Column. Piano music is played throughout much of the day, with live jazz from 19:30. Afternoon tea, a tradition which has taken place at the hotel since its opening in 1931, is served every day of the week at five in the afternoon in the large Promenade and the Spatisserie, with guests seated in decorative upholstered sofas with low tables placed in front of them. The tables are set with elegant silver cutlery and crockery, with Corinthian columns made of marble, glittering chandeliers, French tapestries and potted plants in the background. Tea is served by waiters dressed in English-style long coats. Hollywood actor Charlton Heston, a frequent guest at the hotel, once commented on the aspect of service at the hotel: "The cooks and bakers, the clerks and porters, the maids and the flower ladies, the bell men are the hotel".

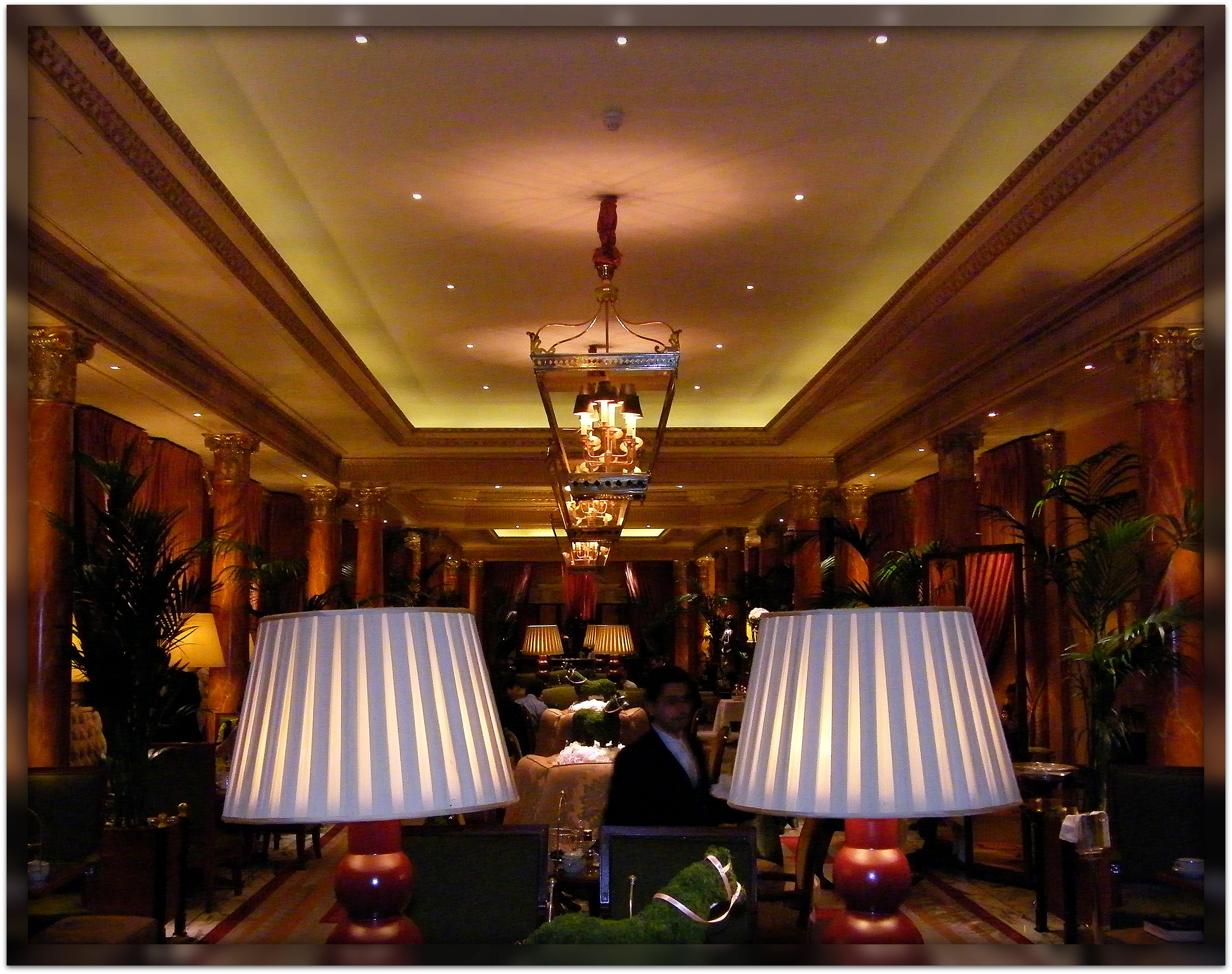
The Promenade

The choice of tea offered to the guests is diverse, and includes the hotel's own Dorchester Blend. The service includes a first course consisting of finger sandwiches with sliced cucumber, cream cheese, and smoked salmon, all served in silver trays, a second course consisting of scones with clotted cream and jam, followed by a pastry tray with a selection of freshly made patisseries.

China Tang is owned by the businessman David Tang and was opened in 2005. The restaurant is luxuriously designed, with an art deco lounge bar reminiscent of 1930s Shanghai. The Spatisserie is an informal restaurant, which specialises in light snacks and afternoon tea, serving cakes, biscuits and pastries.

The Dorchester Bar was initially rebuilt in 1938 and was run by Harry Craddock, one of the world's most famous barmen of the period, known for his Martini, Manhattan and White Lady cocktails. Craddock invented the "Dorchester of London" cocktail here in the 1930s. The bar was refurbished in 1979.

=== Grounds ===
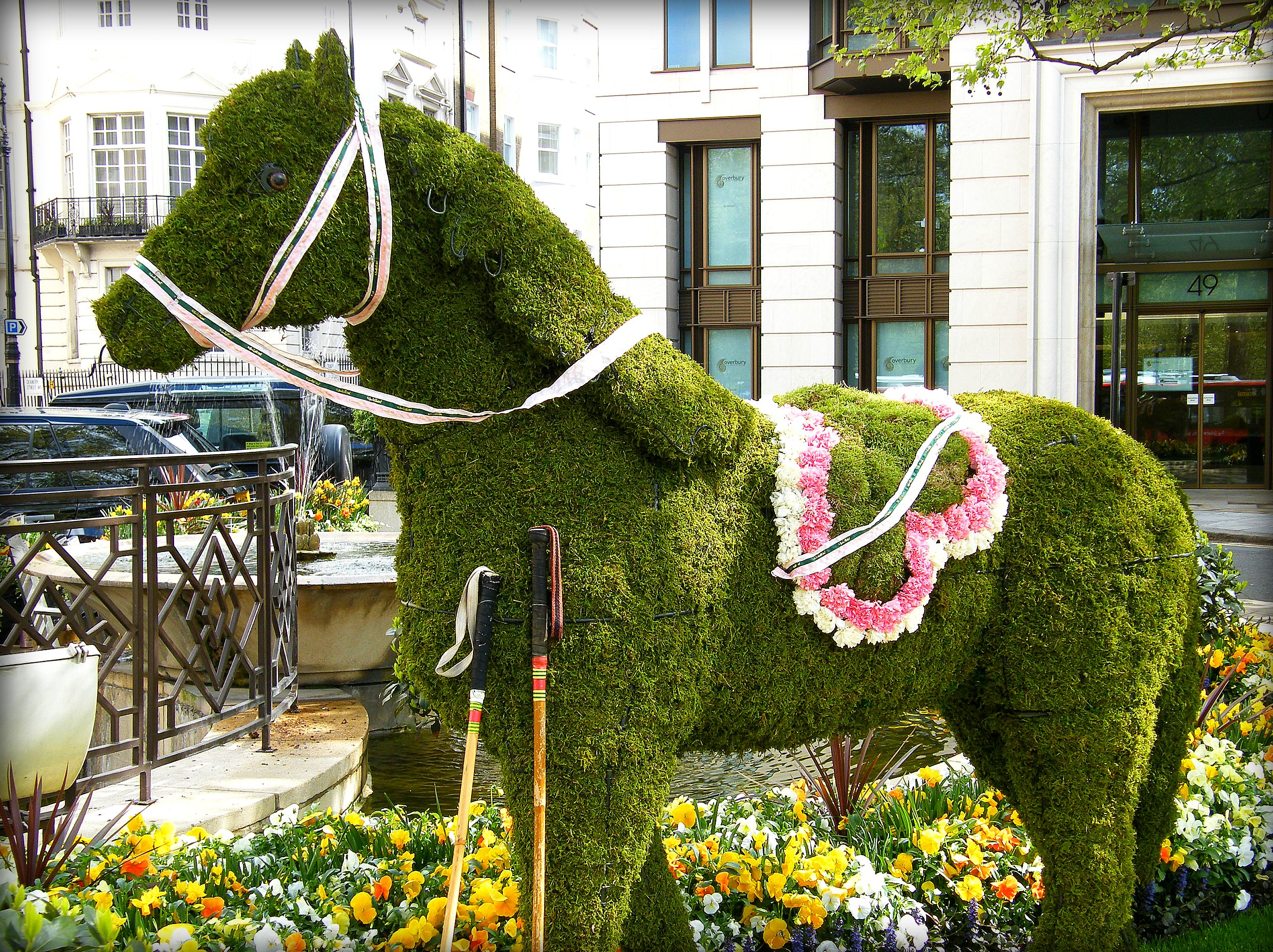
Green horse outside The Dorchester

A plane tree, with its monumental root system, stands at the edge of the hotel in the well-tended front garden. The branches of the tree are fitted with numerous bulbs which makes the night scene of the hotel evocative. Named one of the "Great Trees of London" by the London Tree Forum and Countryside Commission in 1997, it featured in a BBC programme Meetings with Remarkable Trees in 2000.

== Entertainment ==
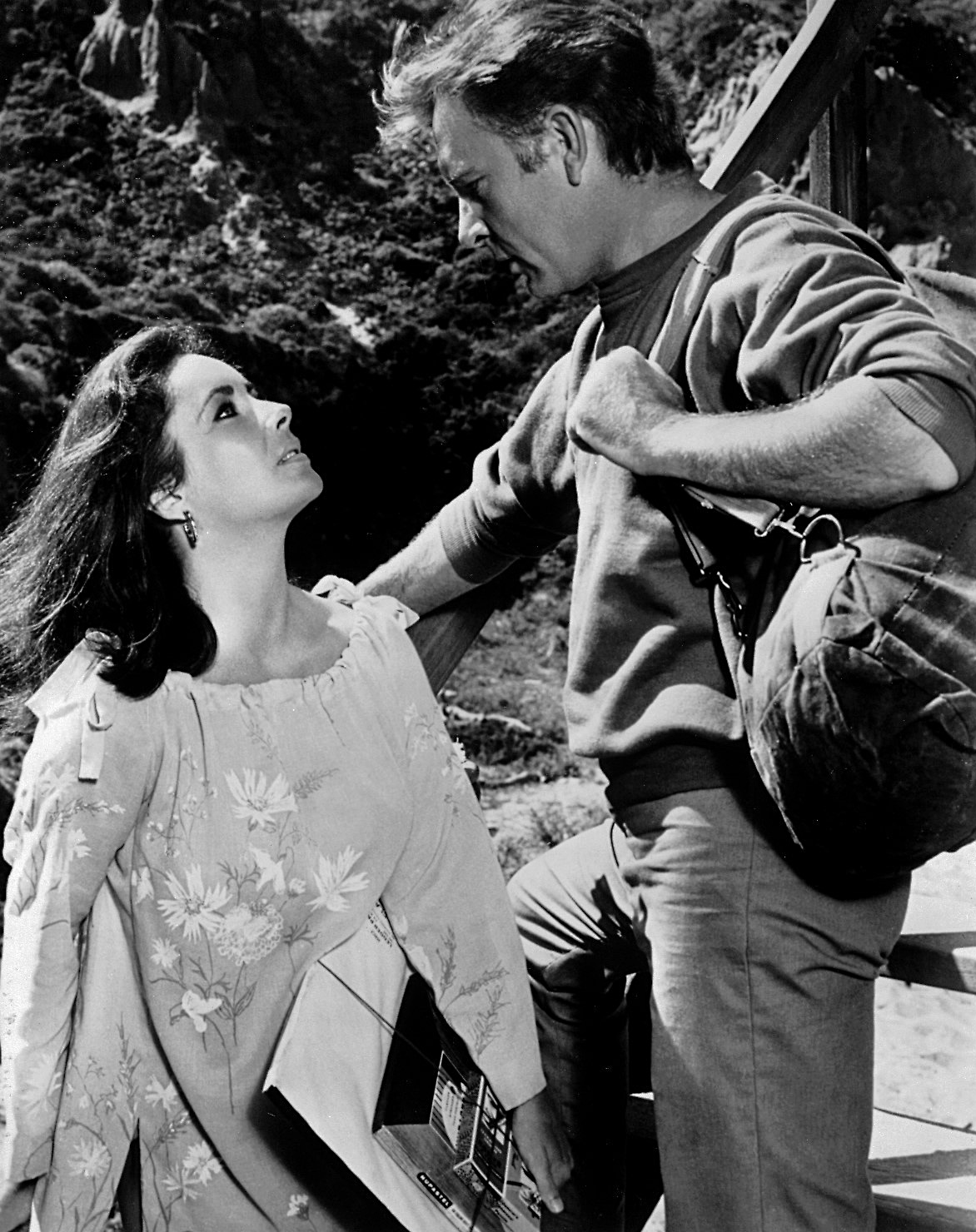
Elizabeth Taylor and Richard Burton frequented The Dorchester.

The hotel has continued to be associated with actors, rock stars and people in entertainment. Numerous film actors and people have auditioned, been interviewed or have stayed at the Dorchester over the years, and it is strongly associated with cinema, particularly American film. From the 1940s onwards the Dorchester was a common rendezvous for film producers, actors and casting agents. In 1940, Gabriel Pascal and David Lean used Pascal's hotel suite as the casting location for the movie Major Barbara; Deborah Kerr, who auditioned for the film, said of it: "How bizarre it was. This room full of chaps smoking enormous cigars and drinking martinis and this young girl reciting the Lords' Prayer."

In the 1940s, producer Earl St. John was found drunk at the hotel; writer and co-producer Eric Ambler promptly sent him back to John Davis in a taxi with a board around his neck with the words "Return to John Davis with compliments". Ray Bradbury stayed at the hotel during the filming of Moby Dick (1956). In 1964, John Lennon was invited to attend one of the Foyle Literary Luncheons after he received acclaim for his book In His Own Write. John and Cynthia were unaware of the high profile of the event and attended with a hangover, with Lennon disappointing the crowd which had gathered at the Dorchester who were expecting a speech, simply muttering "Thank you very much, it's been a pleasure". Richard Burton and Elizabeth Taylor were regulars at the hotel throughout the 1960s and 1970s and spent their honeymoon in the Oliver Messel suite in March 1964.

The hotel has also hosted many footballers attending the F.A. Cup Finals over the years, and in 1961 Leicester City players checked in before playing Tottenham Hotspur. Taylor and Burton were staying there at the time. In 1972, Raquel Welch visited Stamford Bridge and invited the Chelsea Football Club team back to a cocktail party at the Dorchester, which was also attended by the Rolling Stones. In 2003, Ken Bates agreed to sell Chelsea Football Club to Roman Abramovich after they met for 20 minutes at the hotel. It was also at a Dorchester suite that actor Christian Bale was alleged to have assaulted his mother and sister shortly before The Dark Knight premiere in July 2008 and was subsequently arrested.

=== Boycotts ===
In 2014, numerous celebrities started boycotting the hotel due to its links, via the sultanate, to the introduction of Sharia law in Brunei, which includes the death penalty for various forms of immorality.

In March 2019, George Clooney renewed calls for the Dorchester and other hotels owned by the sultanate to be boycotted, after the sultanate adopted a policy of death by stoning as punishment for gay sex. In April 2019, Clooney's call was echoed by Ellen DeGeneres and Elton John. The same month, Deutsche Bank banned its staff from staying at Brunei-owned hotels; the Financial Times and the TV Choice awards said they would cancel events that had been planned at the Dorchester; and the English National Ballet, the Make-A-Wish Foundation and Tempus Magazine said they would review their associations with the Dorchester. Protesters demonstrated outside the Dorchester against the sultanate's policies. The Police Federation of England and Wales cancelled plans to host its awards ceremony at the venue.

== See also ==
- List of restaurants in London
