= Bewley Common =

Hamlet in Wiltshire, England

Coordinates: 51.410°N 02.098°W

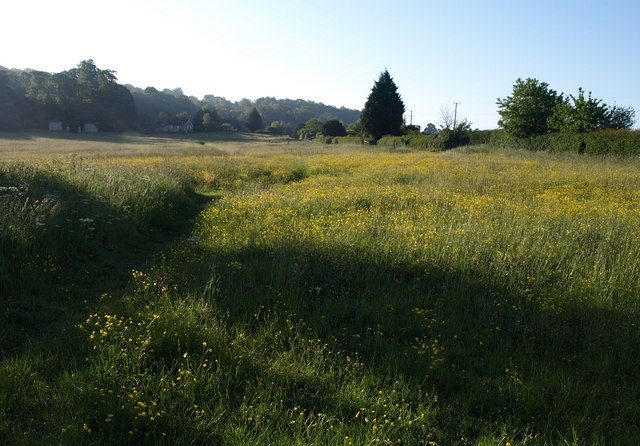
- Bewley Common

- Location within Wiltshire
- OS grid reference: ST933679
- Civil parish: Lacock
- Unitary authority: Wiltshire
- Ceremonial county: Wiltshire
- Region: South West
- Country: England
- Sovereign state: United Kingdom
- Post town: Chippenham
- Postcode district: SN15
- Police: Wiltshire
- Fire: Dorset and Wiltshire
- Ambulance: South Western
- UK Parliament: Chippenham

Bewley Common is a hamlet in Wiltshire, England. It lies in the civil parish of Lacock, west of Bowden Hill and about 1 mile (1.6 km) east of Lacock village.

Bewley Court is a Grade I listed manor house from the 14th century or early 15th. The house was restored and extended c. 1920 to designs by Harold Brakspear, and was the home of interior designer Oliver Ford until his death in 1992.
