= Francis Towle =

British business man

Sir Francis Towle, portrait by Howard Coster, June 1929

Sir Francis William Towle CBE (18 April 1876 – 19 December 1951) was a British business man, Controller of the Navy and Army Canteen Board, managing director of Gordon Hotels, and President of the International Hotel Association.

== Early life ==
Born in Litchurch, Derby, in April 1876, and baptized into the Church of England on 20 May of the same year at Saint Andrew's Church, Towle was the son of William Towle and his wife Elizabeth. He was educated at Marlborough College and Trinity College, Cambridge, where in 1898 he graduated BA, later promoted by seniority to MA.

At the time of Towle's birth, his father was hotel keeper at the Midland Hotel, Derby. He was later manager of the Midland Railway's hotels, a post he held until 1914, planning and overseeing the building of the Midland Hotel, Manchester, and the Midland Adelphi Hotel, Liverpool. A member of the railway's central control board, he was knighted in 1920.

== Career ==
Towle and his younger brother Arthur became joint assistant managers of the Midland Railway hotels under their father. During the First World War, Towle was commissioned into the Royal Army Service Corps and rose to the rank of honorary Lieutenant-Colonel. In 1915 he was appointed as Assistant Inspector, Quartermaster General Services. Between 1916 and 1919, he was Controller of the Navy and Army Canteen Board. In 1918, he was appointed a Commander of the Order of the British Empire and on 19 May 1919 he was knighted. After the war, he was appointed as managing director of Gordon Hotels Ltd, a post he held from 1921 to 1936.

Between 1929 and 1931, Towle was the key player in the creation of the new Dorchester Hotel, in which he had a personal holding of 10 per cent of the share capital. On 28 March 1931, shortly before the hotel opened for business, he gave Queen Mary a personal tour of it.

Towle was President of the International Hotel Alliance from 1935 to 1938 and of the International Hotel Association from 1946 until his death.

== Personal life ==
On 10 April 1901, at St John-at-Hampstead, Towle married Emma Annette, daughter of Thomas Carter and widow of Captain D. A. N. Lomax. They had one daughter, Dorothy Annette, born in 1902; and Towle became the stepfather of his wife's three sons by her previous marriage, one of whom was Cyril Lomax. Captain Lomax was killed at the Battle of Driefontein on 10 March 1900. His youngest son, Victor, was born a few days later on 16 March. He left an estate valued at £19,279 (equivalent to £2,048,778 in 2025), nearly all to his wife and children.

In 1932, at St George's, Hanover Square, Towle's daughter married as his third wife Lieut. Colonel Thomas Walter Colby Carthew, a former Royal Flying Corps fighter pilot.

In 1949, Towle was living at Church Cottage, Winkfield, near Windsor.

Towle's wife died in Kensington on 17 July, 1951, he himself in December of that year.
