= Jean Baptiste Virlogeux =

French chef

Jean Baptiste Virlogeux (1885–1958) was a French chef.

He was the chef at the Savoy Hotel in London during the 1930s. In the 1940s, Virlogeux launched The Dorchester's Chef's Table. He was the head chef of The Dorchester for 10 years, where he catered to, among others, Queen Elizabeth II and Prince Philip.
