= David Tang =

Hong Kong businessman (1954–2017)

Sir David Tang KBE
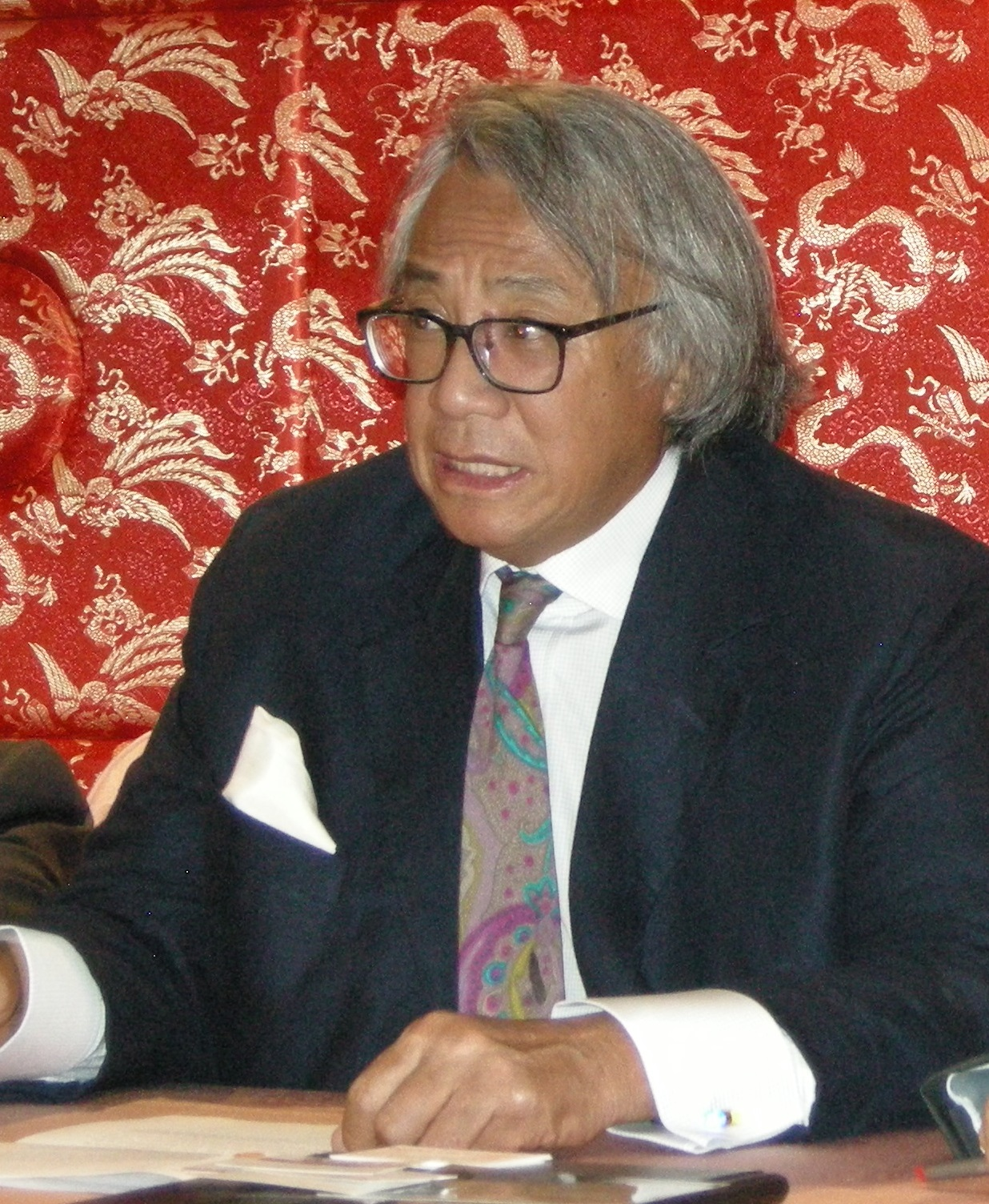
- Tang in 2009
- Born: 2 August 1954; British Hong Kong
- Died: 29 August 2017 (aged 63); The Royal Marsden Hospital, Chelsea, London, England
- Education: King's College London; University of Cambridge
- Occupation: Businessman

Sir David Wing-cheung Tang, KBE (Chinese: 鄧永鏘; pinyin: Dèng Yǒngqiāng; Sidney Lau: Dang^{6}Wing^{5}Cheung^{1}; 2 August 1954 – 29 August 2017), was a Hong Kong businessman, philanthropist and socialite. He was best known for founding the Shanghai Tang fashion chain in 1994, which he sold in 1998 to Richemont.

== Early life and education ==
Tang was born into a prominent, affluent family in Hong Kong. His grandfather, Sir Shiu-Kin Tang (鄧肇堅), co-founded the Kowloon Motor Bus Company and was considered "one of Hong Kong's greatest philanthropists". At the age of 12, he moved with his parents to England. Following his primary education at La Salle Primary School, Tang was sent to board at The Perse School, Cambridge: he later claimed that he was then "aged 13, hardly able to speak a word of English". After leaving Perse in 1973 he went to King's College London to read Philosophy and then Law at the University of Cambridge.

== Career ==
Tang started his career at his grandfather's solicitor firm. He joined the London law firm Macfarlanes as a trainee solicitor, where he was described by the then senior partner Vanni Treves as being "confident, quick witted and funny", as well as being "charmingly undisciplined and unreliable". By mutual agreement he left the firm after a couple of months without completing his training contract, and instead changed career path and joined Swire Pacific Limited. He was the founder of the China Club in Hong Kong, Beijing, and Singapore the Shanghai Tang stores, Havana House and Pacific Cigar Company Ltd (the exclusive distributor for all Cuban cigars in Asia Pacific). More recently Tang opened the Cipriani in Hong Kong and the China Tang restaurant at the Dorchester Hotel. Tang was also a director and advisor to a number of boards, including Tommy Hilfiger.

In 1983–84, Tang taught English literature and philosophy at Peking University in Beijing, China.

== Awards ==
Tang was promoted from OBE to Knight Commander of the Order of the British Empire (KBE) in the 2008 New Year Honours. He was also honoured by the French Government as Chevalier of the Ordre des Arts et des Lettres (1995). He received the award for Outstanding Achievement in Art and Design at the Asian Awards in 2014.

== Other roles ==
Sir David was the Honorary Consul of Cuba in Hong Kong. From time to time, he contributed articles for newspapers.

Tang was patron of the Hong Kong Youth Arts Festival from 1993.

Tang was invited to provide a weekly English column for the Chinese-language Hong Kong newspaper Apple Daily. A selection of his articles has been published in a book An Apple a Week (published in 2006). He also contributed an "agony uncle" column to the weekend Financial Times, in which he responded to readers' social dilemmas.

According to the Epstein files, Tang sent emails in 2010 to Ghislaine Maxwell, a close associate of the financier and sex offender Jeffrey Epstein. Tang asked her to invest in ICorrect, a website where celebrities could post fixes and refutations of incorrect information spreading over the internet, which launched in 2011. Celebrities who joined ICorrect included Cherie Blair, John Bond, Jemima Goldsmith, Sienna Miller, Zac Goldsmith, Niall Ferguson, Stephen Fry and Naomi Campbell. ICorrect charged them US$1,000 annually and Tang paid himself a million-dollar salary. It was criticized for not needing proof or assessment. Maxwell called the business plan "a joke" and expressed reservations over possible legal implications, eventually withdrawing her stake.

Tang was a contact in Epstein's "little black book" and, in 1997, went to a party with Epstein and Maxwell in London. Tang defended Prince Andrew's friendship with Epstein in 2012.

== Support for Hong Kong democracy ==
Tang was unrestrained in speaking, at times scathingly, in opposition to the Hong Kong Government. He was particularly incensed by its intransigence on democratic reform. In a speech, on 18 February 2016, to the Foreign Correspondents Club, Hong Kong, in reference to the Chief Executive's policy address, he said,

"Whoever wrote that first sentence for the chief executive, if he himself did not write it, must be a comedian; or perhaps a monkey who accidentally typed up those words on a typewriter. What it all means to me is the disingenuousness of our chief executive and government, and the contempt with which they hold us, the citizens of Hong Kong. ... Our government has been growing apart from the people of Hong Kong and they must anticipate trouble. Already, there are over one million people in Hong Kong who are trapped by poverty, and they cannot be too pleased about the government. It is simply invidious that in a prosperous community such as Hong Kong, over 15 percent of our population should be living below the breadline. It is a shameful state, scandalous if you ask me. Then there was the Umbrella Movement, which clearly demonstrated the resolution of many ordinary people taking real democratic power seriously, and their dissatisfaction can only be increased by the defeat of the universal suffrage motion in LegCo."

== Later life ==
In August 2017, Asia Times reported that Tang planned a farewell party at the Dorchester Hotel in London as doctors had given him only a month or two to live. However, before the farewell party could occur, Tang died on 29 August 2017 from liver cancer, four weeks after his 63rd birthday, leaving behind his wife Lucy and two children from his first marriage to Susanna Cheung.

== Lawsuits ==
The China Club (China Investment Incorporations) Limited filed a lawsuit against the estate of the late Sir David Tang in the High Court, alleging breaches of fiduciary duty. The suit claims that Tang improperly transferred over HK$100 million from the company's funds to his personal accounts or those of related companies, violating his responsibilities as a director.

Key allegations include: 1. Cash Transfers: Between 2016 and 2017, Tang allegedly transferred more than HK$51.87 million from the club's account to his personal or controlled accounts.

2. Art Auction Proceeds: From 2007 to 2014, Tang is accused of auctioning artworks belonging to the club and depositing the HK$56.29 million proceeds into his own account.

3. Dividend Misappropriation: Between 1998 and 2016, he reportedly distributed over HK$6.74 million to himself during shareholder dividend distributions.

== Books ==
- Rules for Modern Life: A Connoisseur's Survival Guide, Portfolio Penguin, 2016
- A Chink in the Armour, Enrich Publications, 2010 (second edition)
- An Apple a Week, Next Publications, 2007 (third edition)
- East Meets West: Global Design for Contemporary Interiors, Conran, 1998 (Kelly Hoppen), foreword.
- Quotations from Chairman Uncle Dave, privately printed
