= Bowden Hill =

Village in Wiltshire, England

Coordinates: 51.410°N 02.091°W

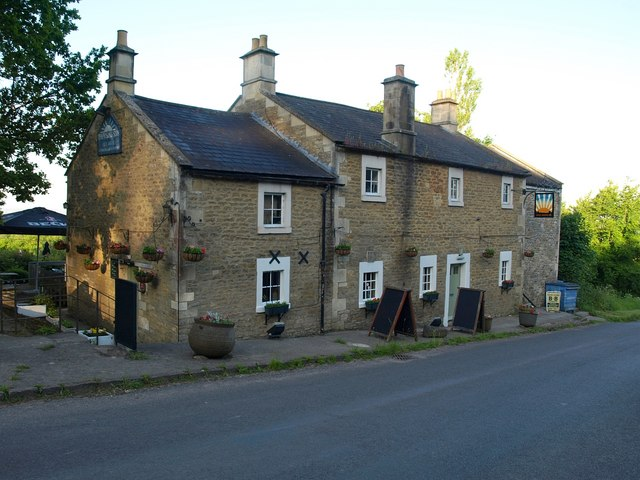
- The Rising Sun, Bowden Hill

- Location within Wiltshire
- OS grid reference: ST938679
- Civil parish: Lacock
- Unitary authority: Wiltshire
- Ceremonial county: Wiltshire
- Region: South West
- Country: England
- Sovereign state: United Kingdom
- Post town: Chippenham
- Postcode district: SN15
- Dialling code: 01249
- Police: Wiltshire
- Fire: Dorset and Wiltshire
- Ambulance: South Western
- UK Parliament: Chippenham

Bowden Hill is a village in Wiltshire, England, in Lacock parish about 3 1/2 miles (6 km) south of Chippenham and 1 1/2 miles (2.4 km) to the east of Lacock village. Bowden Hill has about 50 houses, a pub, and a small industrial estate.

== Origins of the name ==
The spelling 'Bowdon Hill' was used on Andrews’ and Dury’s maps of 1773 and 1810. There are a number of theories around why the village got its name. One is that the name comes from the old English words 'bow', meaning bow shaped, and 'dun' meaning hill. However, alternative theories suggest the name comes from a corruption of 'bdl' (meaning dwelling) into 'bow' meaning 'hill slope on which are dwellings'. Another theory from 'Wiltshire Collections' by Aubrey and Jackson suggests that the name means 'the winding hill'.

== Location ==
Bowden Hill sits on the side of a hill and rises up from the River Avon, at an elevation of 50m, to its peak at 172m above sea level. The village has views to the south and south-west of the river's flood plain and is surrounded by a mixture of woodlands and agricultural land. Bowden Hill borrows many of its facilities from the nearby village of Lacock and doesn't provide amenities such as a school or post office. The village encompasses the small hamlet of Bewley Common and enjoys a relatively sparse population density due to its designation as a conservation area.

== Landmarks ==
=== Parish church ===
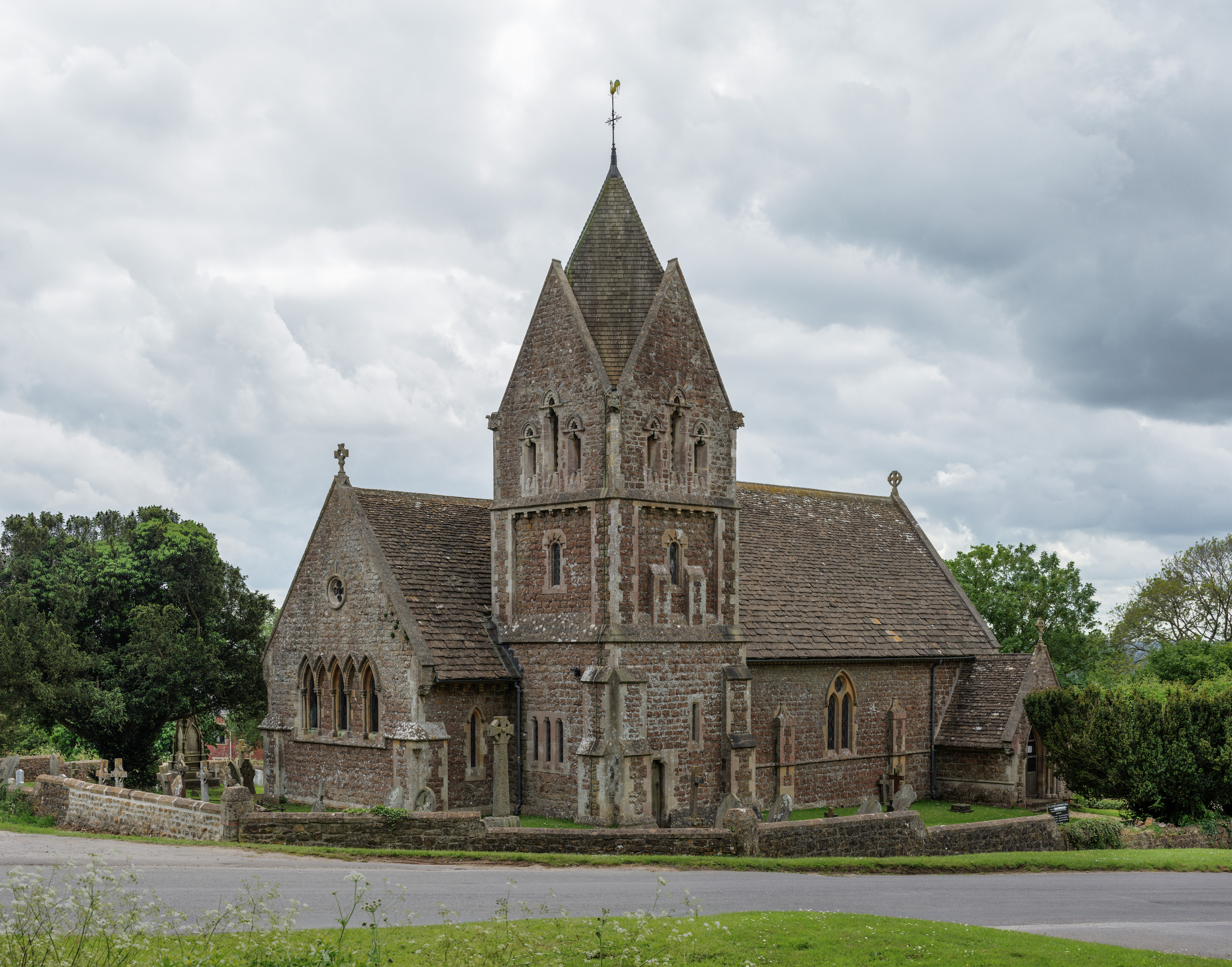
Church of St Anne

In 1856, John Gladstone, owner of Bowden Park, had the Church of England parish church of Saint Anne built to celebrate the birth of a son in the Gladstone family. The architect was S.B. Gabriel of Bristol who designed the nave and chancel in the Early English Gothic style but gave the northeast tower Norman details and a Rhenish helm, a German Romanesque roof. The parish of Lacock was split and the new parish of Bowden Hill served around 300-400 people, but the two parishes were reunited in 1958. Today services are held at St Anne's on the first Sunday of each month.

=== Conduit House ===
Sitting in the common land in the village is a small building which was used as a supply of water for the nearby Lacock Abbey. Built in the 16th century, this small 3.7m square building still supplies water to the abbey albeit through a modern water pipe. The original conduit house was built in around 1280 when Willian Bluet of Bewley Court granted Beatrice, Abbess of Lacock, the right to operate a watercourse on his land to serve the nunnery. This original building was replaced by the owner of the abbey, William Sharington, after its dissolution. The new building is built of limestone and has a steep roof, reaching 4.64m high, constructed of interlocking stone slabs.

=== Bowden Park ===
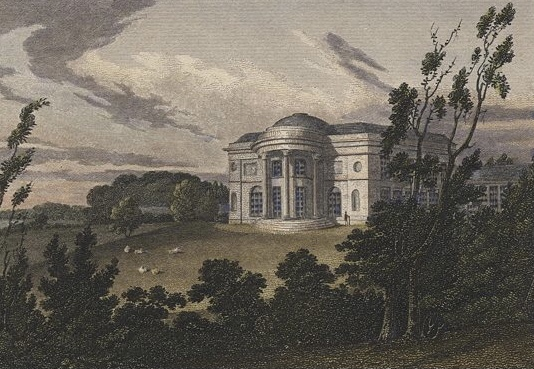
Bowden Park, an engraving of 1811

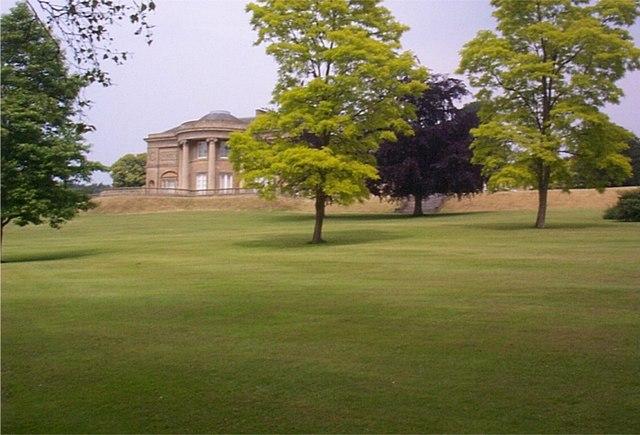
Bowden Park in 2000, obscured by trees

One of largest landmarks in Bowden Hill is the Bowden Park estate with its country house of 1796, designed by James Wyatt for Barnard Dickinson. The Dickinson family had owned plantations in Jamaica since 1655, and were among Wiltshire's biggest users of slave labour. The property had a previous building, built for George Johnson who lived there in the 1600s. The estate was sold in 1751 to Ezekiel Dickinson who modified the house; it was later owned by the Dickinson Harmer family.

The house was bought in 1849 and extended by Captain John Gladstone, older brother of Prime Minister William Gladstone. In the 20th century it was the seat of the former chairman of the General Electric Company, Arnold Weinstock. The house was remodelled in the mid 1950s, and the extensions were made smaller by owner K. Peacock who sold Bowden Park in 1967 to Lord Weinstock. A 2020 report summarizes the building as: "Built on two storeys of ashlar under a slate roof, the grand 15,900sq ft house is Classically symmetrical in style, with a central bow front, where the original front door was placed, and finely detailed wings to either side".

Bowden Park was designated as Grade I listed in 1960.

=== Spye Park ===
Spye Park lies on the edge of Bowden Hill to the southeast of the village. Although most of Spye Park is in Bromham parish, the gatelodge at its northwest entrance (originally a 16th-century building) stands on the edge of Bowden Hill village.
