= William Howard Winterbotham =

British solicitor

Sir William Howard Winterbotham (13 December 1843 – 24 January 1926) was a British solicitor. He was Official Solicitor to the Supreme Court from 1895 to 1919. He was knighted in 1919.
