= William Robert Smith (physician) =

British forensic scientist, public health expert and local politician

Sir William Robert Smith FRSE DL JP (1850–1932) was a 19th/20th century British forensic scientist, public health expert and a local politician. He was founder of the Public Health Medical Society which was later renamed the Royal Institute of Public Health.

== Life ==
He was born in Plumstead in Kent on 28 May 1850 the son of Captain R. T. Smith. He was initially apprenticed to a chemist.

He studied medicine at Edinburgh and Aberdeen University graduating MB ChB in 1876. He then did further studies at University College, London also undergoing practical training at St. Bartholomew's Hospital in London.

In 1880 he was elected a Fellow of the Royal Society of Edinburgh. His proposers were William Pirrie, James Matthews Duncan, Thomas Wright and John Hutton Balfour.

In 1881 he obtained a diploma in public health from Cambridge University. In 1888 he also passed the bar as a barrister. In 1889 he became professor of forensic medicine and toxicology at King's College, London.

In 1908 he joined the Territorial Army at the rank of major and in the First World War he served in the Royal Army Medical Corps as sanitary officer of the 67th Division.

He presided over two international Public Health Congresses: London in 1894 and Paris in 1913. He had honorary doctorates from Athens, Padua, Ghent and Geneva. He was principal of the Royal Institute of Public Health, which he helped found. He was a member of the Metropolitan Asylums Board, and from 1910 to 1913 served as its vice-chairman.

He died in London on 17 March 1932, aged 82.

== Local politics ==
From 1893 to 1896 he was Mayor of Holborn. He was also served as chairman of the Holborn Board of Guardians. For twenty years he represented the ward of Farringdon Without in the Court of the Common Council for the City of London. He served as a Sheriff of London for 1918/19 and at the point of his death was Deputy Lieutenant for London.

== Publications ==
- Laboratory Textbook of Public Health
- Editor of the 7th edition of Guy & Ferrier's Forensic Medicine

== Family ==
In 1913 he married Frances Wheeler Byles.
