= Lacock =

Village in Wiltshire, England

Coordinates: 51.415°N 2.123°W

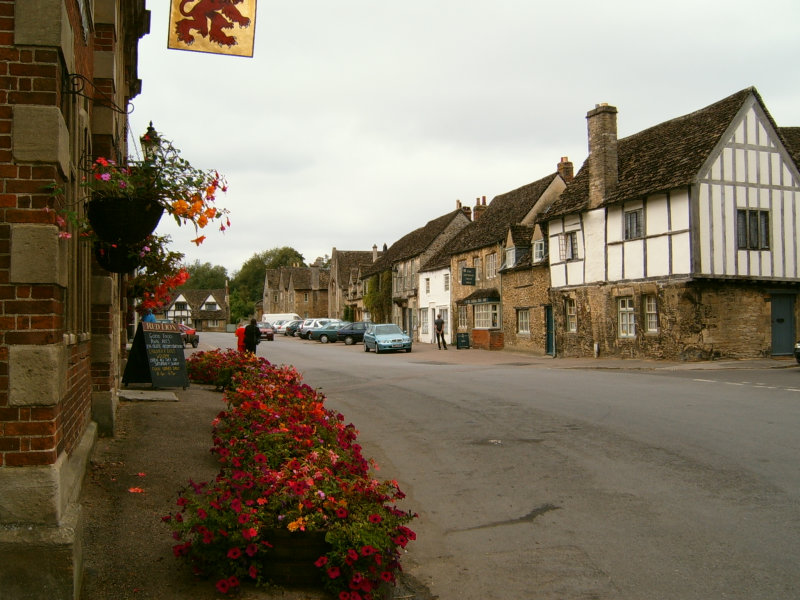
- High Street, Lacock

- Location within Wiltshire
- Population: 1,159 (in 2011)
- OS grid reference: ST915685
- Unitary authority: Wiltshire
- Ceremonial county: Wiltshire
- Region: South West
- Country: England
- Sovereign state: United Kingdom
- Post town: CHIPPENHAM
- Postcode district: SN15
- Dialling code: 01249
- Police: Wiltshire
- Fire: Dorset and Wiltshire
- Ambulance: South Western
- UK Parliament: Chippenham
- Website: Parish Council

Lacock is a village and civil parish in the county of Wiltshire, England, about 3 miles (5 km) south of the town of Chippenham, and about 3.7 miles (6.0 km) outside the Cotswolds area. The village is owned almost in its entirety by the National Trust and attracts many visitors by virtue of its unspoiled appearance.

The parish includes Bowden Hill, a small village 1 mile (1.6 km) to the east of Lacock, and the hamlets of Bewley Common, Notton and Reybridge. The Chippenham–Melksham section of the A350 primary route crosses the parish from north to south, as does the River Avon.

A scarecrow festival is held annually in Lacock and is popular with visitors from the local area. All funds raised are donated to Lacock Primary School.

== History ==
Lacock is mentioned in the Domesday Book of 1086, with a population of 160–190; with two mills and a vineyard. Lacock Abbey was founded on the manorial lands by Ela, Countess of Salisbury and established in 1232; and the village – with the manor – formed its endowment to "God and St Mary". Lacock was granted a market and developed a thriving woollen industry during the Middle Ages. Reybridge, and a packhorse ford, remained the only crossing points of the River Avon until the 18th century.

At the dissolution, the Abbey and estate, including the village, were sold to William Sharington, later passing into the Talbot family by marriage. The Lacock estate was home to photography pioneer Henry Fox Talbot from 1800 to 1877.

In 1916 Henry Fox Talbot's son Charles bequeathed the Lacock estate to his niece, Matilda Gilchrist-Clark, who took the name of Talbot. The estate – comprising 284 acres (1.15 km^{2}), the Abbey and the village – was given to the National Trust in 1944 by Matilda Talbot. Lacock has three public houses and a number of shops in its High Street including a grocery store, a bakery, gift shops and a National Trust shop.

== Notable buildings and structures ==
Most of the surviving houses in the village are 18th century or earlier in construction. Lacock Abbey, the 14th-century St Cyriac's Church and a 14th-century tithe barn are Grade I listed. Elsewhere in the parish, the country houses at Bewley Court (14th century, restored 1920) and Bowden Park (1796) are also Grade I listed.

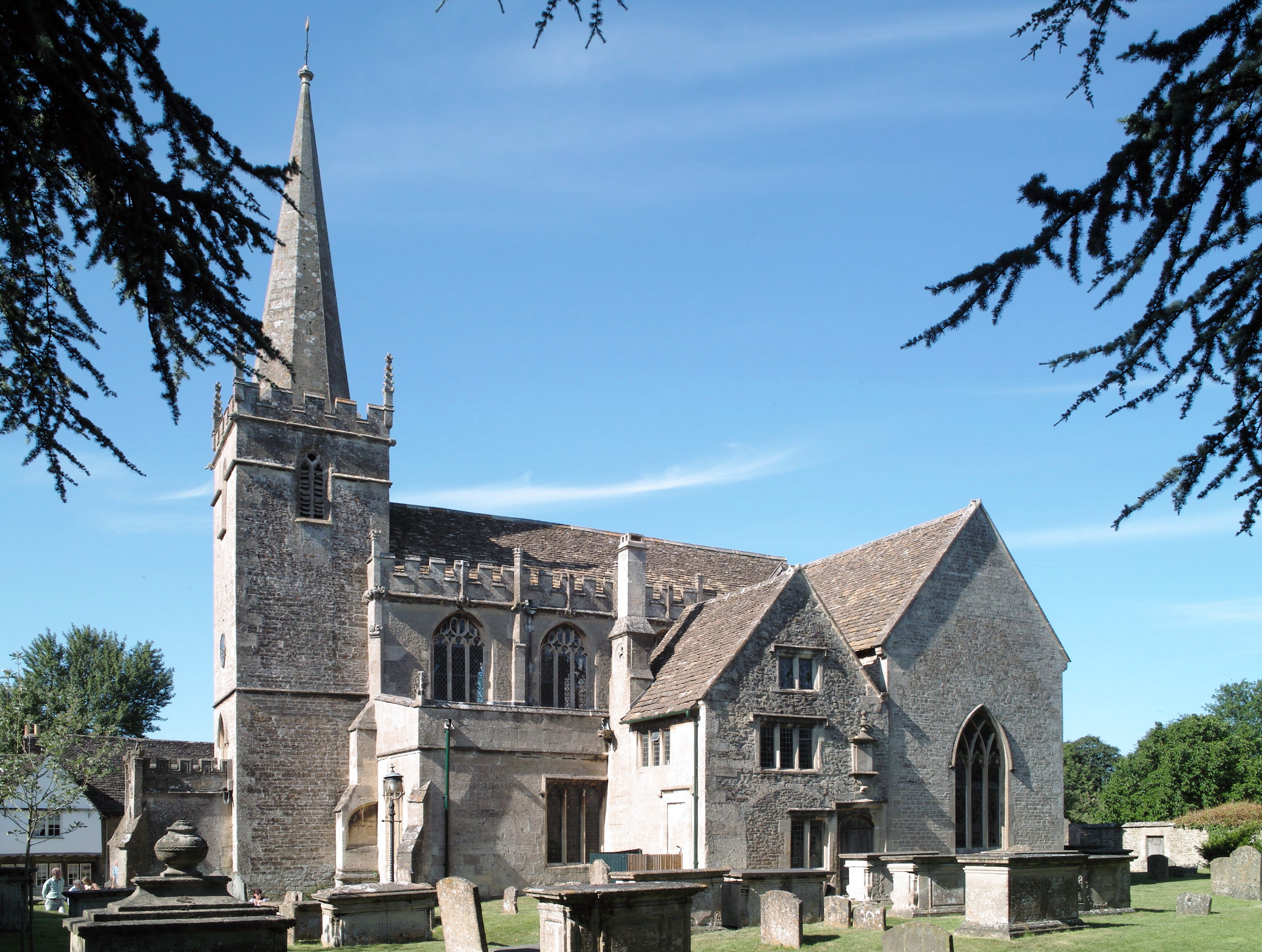
Church of St Cyriac, Lacock was established in the late 11th century

There are four Grade II* listed structures: The Sign of the Angel (late 15th-century house, now an inn); a village cross (late medieval, re-erected outside the school in the late 19th century); a pair of bridges carrying the Bowden Hill road over the Avon (late medieval, 17th and 19th century); and a 16th-century conduit house, part of the abbey's water supply, opposite Bowden Hill church. Next to the tithe barn is a small lock-up from the late 18th century.

Ray Mill House, north of the village on the left bank of the Avon beyond Reybridge, is a country house built in Italianate style around 1860. Since 1996 it has been a residence of Camilla Parker Bowles, later Queen Camilla.

Further north and also overlooking the Avon, Lackham House was built in 1791–1796 for James Montagu, naval officer. It is a three-storey country house in Palladian style.

== Education ==
A school was provided on a central site in Lacock village by Henry Fox Talbot in 1824, with accommodation for 100 pupils. Another classroom was added in 1852 and around this time it became a National School; by 1858 there were about 120 pupils. The school was rebuilt on the same site in 1859, again at the expense of the Talbot family, for 220 pupils and 80 infants. Numbers declined in the 20th century; 135 attended in 1955 when the school gained voluntary controlled status. Children of all ages were educated until the early 1960s when older pupils were transferred to Chippenham.

Since 1946 there has been an agricultural college at the Lackham estate, in the north of the parish towards Chippenham. With its 400-acre (160 ha) farm it is now part of Wiltshire College.

== Filming location ==
The village has been used as a film and television location, notably for the 1995 BBC production of Pride and Prejudice and the 2007 BBC production of Cranford. It also made brief appearances in the Harry Potter films Harry Potter and the Philosopher's Stone and Harry Potter and the Half-Blood Prince, and in the spin-off film Fantastic Beasts: The Crimes of Grindelwald. In the spring of 2012, it was a filming location for the fantasy adventure film Mariah Mundi and the Midas Box.

In 2015, Lacock was used for an episode of the Downton Abbey TV series, portraying a livestock market of the 1920s; Lord Grantham, his family and some of the staff appeared in this location. Not long after, the village was featured in two episodes of the Wolf Hall series, based on the novels by Hilary Mantel. Scenes for the 2017 film Beauty and the Beast were shot here, and in late 2018, scenes for the film version of Downton Abbey included a royal parade; the film was released in September 2019.

The village was also used for the music video for the song I Believe (In Love), a 1971 hit for the British band Hot Chocolate.

== Notable people ==
Lacock was the childhood home of Zoe Sugg and Joe Sugg, siblings who both run YouTube channels.
