= International Hotel & Restaurant Association =

Trade association

- Abbreviation: IHRA
- Formation: November 1947
- Type: Trade association
- Legal status: Non-profit company
- Purpose: Umbrella trade association for worldwide hotel restaurant industry
- Headquarters: 42 Avenue General Guisan, Lausanne, 1009 Pully-Switzerland
- Region served: Global
- Members: Respective national trade associations
- Official language: English and French
- President: Dr. Ghassan Aïdi
- Main organ: Executive Committee
- Website: IHRA http://www.ih-ra.org

The International Hotel & Restaurant Association (IHRA) is an international trade association representing the interests of the hotel and restaurant industries.

== History ==
The IHRA was founded in Koblenz, Germany in 1859.

In April 1921, various European, African and North and South American hotel associations met and decided to merge into a new globally recognized, international association, under the name of the International Hotels Alliance (IHA).

November 1947: Shortly after the end of the Second World War and the creation of the United Nations, hoteliers from the IHA met together with The European Aubergistes Association, and with the Asian Innkeepers Association in London, United Kingdom, and decided to merge into a larger international association aimed at defending the hospitality private sector worldwide, by lobbying governments, public sectors, and the Military. This was the launch of the International Hotels Association (IHA), with Sir Francis Towle as its first President. He had previously chaired the International Hotel Alliance from 1935 to 1938.

The French Government registered IHA in September 1949 and granted it the status of a Public Utility Association and a Non-Profit status. The head office was moved from London and established in the heart of Paris, France.

December 1949: The Argentinean Government recognized IHA and gave it a Non-Profit status, under the name of Asociación Internacional de Hosteleria.

May 1950: The West German Government recognized IHA and gave it a Non-Resident Association status, under the name of Internationaler Hotelverband.

November 1953: The United Nations Economic and Social Council (ECOSOC) gave IHA the status of Consultative Representation of hoteliers worldwide. Further, the United Nations Conference on Trade and Development granted IHA a Permanent Observer status.

October 1960:The Hotel Association of New York (HANYC) applied to join IHA and become the first US association to join IHA and to become a full member.

January 1978: New by-laws and articles of incorporation came into effect worldwide and for the first time, all global IHA members met and voted to adopt them effective immediately for a period of 30 years.

The organization changes its name to the International Hotel and Restaurant Association in November 1996 and, year later, in November 1997, the International Hotel and Restaurant Association and the International HORECA (hotels, restaurants, and cafes) agreed to a merger, effective immediately. The organization continued to operate under the IH&RA's name and headquarters in Paris, France.

The organization was granted special consultative status by the United Nations in 1995.

In December 2007, IH&RA’s head office was moved to Geneva, Switzerland, after 65 years in France.

February 2008: The Swiss government registered IH&RA with its new adopted status.

May 2016: Dr. Ghassan Aidi was elected President of IH&RA for a term of four years.

In the present time, IH&RA has expanded its offices to Geneva, Paris and Barcelona, with new international offices opening soon in Washington, D.C. and Hong Kong.

== Structure ==
IH&RA members are national hotel and restaurant associations throughout the world, and international and national hotel and restaurant chains representing some 50 brands. Officially recognized by the United Nations, IH&RA monitors and lobbies international agencies on behalf of the industry, estimated to comprise 400,000 hotels and 8 million restaurants, employs 60 million people and contributes 950 billion USD annually to the global economy.

== Awards ==
- Hotelier of The Century
- Emeraude Hotel of The Year
- Diamond Leader of The Year

== See also ==
- Confederation of Tourism and Hospitality
