= Boungbale =

- Location in Togo
- Coordinates: 9°5′N 0°40′E
- Country: Togo
- Region: Kara Region
- Prefecture: Bassar
- Time zone: UTC + 0

Boungbale is a town in the Bassar Prefecture in the Kara Region of Togo. Nearby towns and villages include Bongbon (2.3 kilometres [1.4 miles]), Lidialabo (1.6 km [1.0 mi]), Demon (3.2 km [2.0 mi]), Diabirdo (3.2 km [2.0 mi]), and Tipakpane (3.5 km [2.2 mi]).

The nearest airport is 40 km (25 mi) away at Niamtougou International Airport.

There are also two other villages in the Prefecture which have the same name. These are located at:

- Boungbale 9°47′N 0°30′W
- Boungbale 9°40′N 0°0′W
