= Haba =

Haba may refer to:

- Habermaaß, a.k.a. Haba, a German toy maker
- Haba, Togo, a village in the Bassar Prefecture in the Kara Region of north-western Togo
- Haba Xueshan, a mountain in Yunnan, China
- La Haba, a municipality located in the province of Badajoz, Extremadura, Spain
- Spanish name for Vicia faba, the fava bean, or for Phaseolus lunatus, the Haba bean
- Alois Hába (1893 – 1973), Czech composer, music theorist and teacher.
- Siling haba, a chili pepper native to the Philippines.

== See also ==
- Haba Station (disambiguation)
- Habas (disambiguation)
