= Bassar Prefecture =

Prefecture of Kara region in Togo

Coordinates: 9.2500°N 0.7833°E

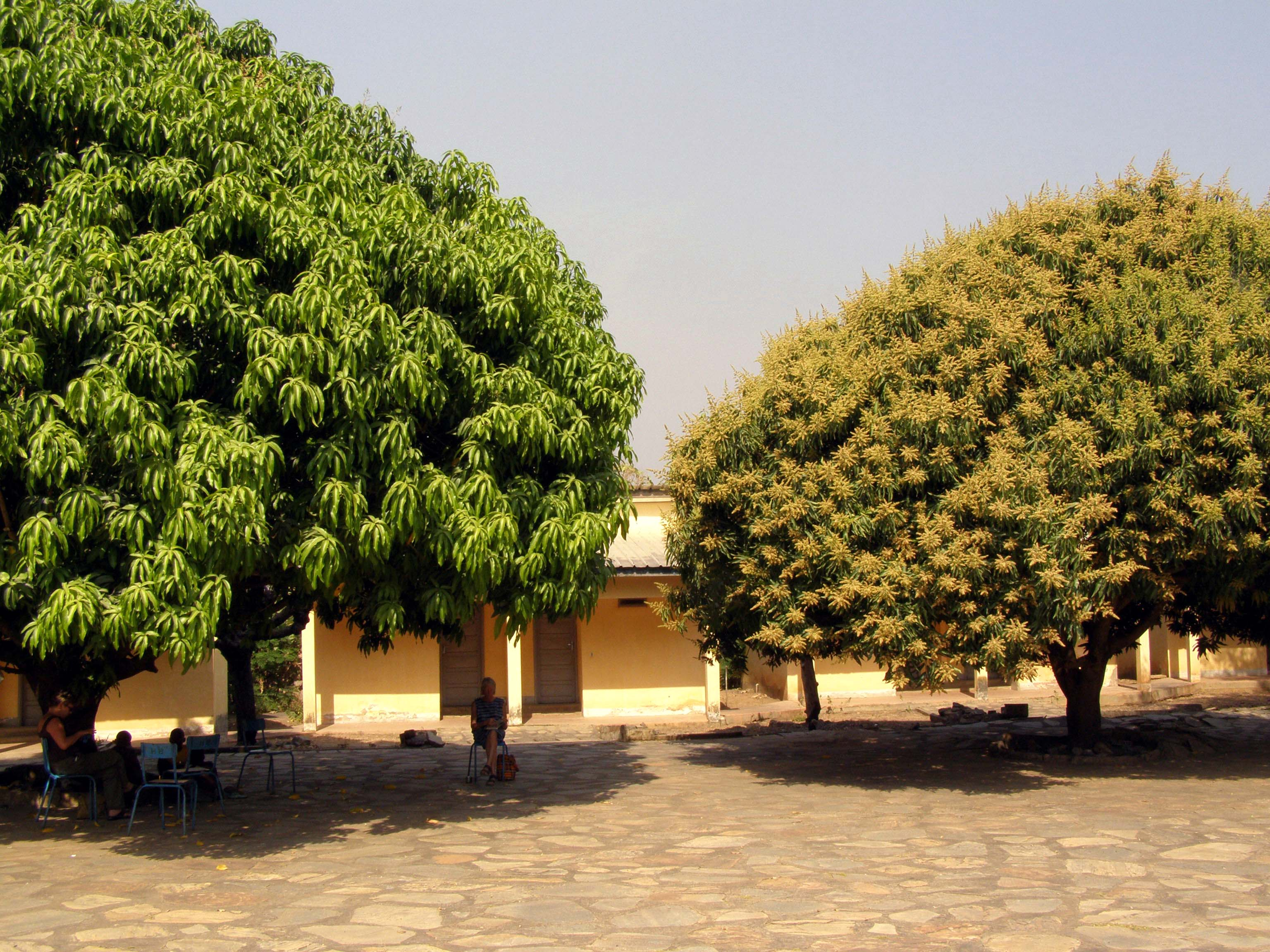
Bassar Prefecture

Bassar Prefecture (French: Préfecture de Bassar) is one of the prefectures of Togo and is located in Kara Region in Togo. The cantons (or subdivisions) of Bassar include Bassar, Kabou, Bitchabé, Dimouri, Sanda-Kagbanda, Bangéli, Baghan, Sanda-Afowou, Manga, and Kalanga. At the time of the 2022 census, it had a population of 152,065 people.

== Climate ==
The overall Kara Region has a tropical Guinean-type climate. There is a dry season from October to April with northern trade winds and a wet season from April to October with southern trade winds. Average temperatures vary from 26.4° C to 28.3° C. Mean annual precipitation is between 1,000 and 1,800 mm.

== History ==
The Bassar People ethnic group is indigenous to the prefecture. Before the European slave trade period, they were known for metallurgical activities, producing tools and weapons made from iron by the early 17th century, which were exported from the region. This activity was disrupted during the slave trade period and settlement patterns shifted to "hilltops, slopes, and rock shelters" more easily defensible against horse-mounted slave traders.

== Towns and villages ==
Towns and villages in Bassar Prefecture:

=== A ===
- Afoou
- Akalede
- Aketa
- Akomomboua
- Alidounpo
- Apoeydoumpo
- Atontebou

=== B ===
- Badao
- Baga
- Bakari
- Bakoule
- Bakpaya
- Bamandou
- Bamoundo
- Bandiadou
- Bandjeli
- Bangan
- Bangbou
- Banjena
- Baouda
- Baoulinse
- Bapele
- Bapure
- Bassambo
- Bassar
- Bassassin
- Bassoude
- Baya
- Bekando
- Bekouleb
- Bekouroube
- Belemele
- Benata
- Beoaja
- Bessarakpenbe
- Bia
- Biakpabe
- Bidaibe
- Bigabo
- Bijobebe
- Bijomanbe
- Bikambombe
- Bikoutikpandi
- Bikpadiab
- Bikpandib
- Binadioub
- Binadioube
- Binako
- Binanoualiba
- Binaparba
- Binatape
- Bindiba
- Bissibi
- Bissokpabe
- Bitankpan
- Bitiakpa
- Bittindam
- Bokourobe
- Bongboldo
- Bongbon
- Bongoulou
- Borbogou
- Boro
- Borokpindo
- Bouele
- Bougab
- Boukoukpanbe
- Boukpassiba
- Boulou
- Bouman
- Boundiale
- Boundido
- Boungbale
- Bounkoulinki
- Bounkouloum
- Bounlare
- Boussekou
- Boussie
- Boutado
- Boutiatiale
- Boutob
- Bouzem

=== C ===
- Chaboua
- Chapouko
- Chodouko

=== D ===
- Daboute
- Dakpetab
- Demon
- Dengbaza
- Diab
- Diabagbal
- Diabirdo
- Diabougou
- Diadiaba
- Diakpanion
- Diampele
- Dianbildo
- Diangouyadou
- Dianta
- Dibaldi
- Dibanjori
- Dibeti
- Didyoyeri
- Dimouri
- Diotaoul
- Dioubo
- Ditanpayabouri
- Dolardo
- Dondonne
- Douande

=== E ===
- Egbetab
- Etiotia

=== F ===
- Fono
- Fougo

=== G ===
- Gangan
- Garimbomb
- Garka
- Gassema
- Gbangbale
- Guérin-Kouka

=== H ===
- Haba

=== I ===
- Iboundiou
- Idambado
- Ikokoueni
- Ikpasse
- Immoudo
- Inare
- Infalebou
- Inkoukoumamne
- Insadou
- Insalabou
- Insandiapo

=== J ===
- Jimbiri
- Jiunjiunde

=== K ===
- Kabanda
- Kabangbag
- Kabikou
- Kabou
- Kada
- Kadio
- Kadjika
- Kadogou
- Kadoue
- Kaka
- Kakourou
- Kakpale
- Kaktapalessi
- Kalanga
- Kali
- Kamaama
- Kampale
- Kanboua
- Kandiado
- Kankounde
- Katcha
- Katchamba
- Ketangbao
- Kidjaboum
- Kikpan
- Kikpeou
- Kiniakara
- Kissaboui
- Kissaboun
- Kissachieou
- Kiteou
- Kitoman
- Kojenade
- Kolaboun
- Konadiou
- Konassi
- Kossamossi
- Kotateou
- Kouangan
- Kouboabo
- Koubodohon
- Koubongou
- Koudaboubou
- Koudyobe
- Koudyobon
- Koudyoman
- Koudyopongpong
- Koukoumboul
- Koukpan
- Koulamon
- Koulation
- Koulassi
- Koulifiagou
- Koumalo
- Koumalou
- Koumaye
- Koumbiretou
- Koundouta
- Kouni
- Kountoum
- Koupassassi
- Koussatieou
- Koussatine
- Koutanbado
- Koutchicheou
- Kouteo
- Koutian
- Koutiere
- Koutobi
- Kpale
- Kpandia
- Kpankpande
- Kperea
- Kpouembek

=== L ===
- Labo
- Ladiek
- Lajoudoun
- Langonde
- Lanke
- Laou
- Latioubdo
- Lekpande
- Lele
- Liagalbou
- Liboungdial
- Lidialabo
- Lidyobilbou
- Lidyomalbo
- Lie
- Ligbale
- Ligbalebou
- Loajoule
- Loande
- Louakban
- Louholoubo

=== M ===
- Mabo
- Maboualabi
- Makalea
- Manando
- Manka
- Manniedo
- Massejioun
- Massipou
- Meda
- Meifogou
- Mewindo
- Moande
- Mogbante
- Moukpido

=== N ===
- Nabib
- Nabouab
- Naboukor
- Nabouni
- Nabouri
- Nafindioul
- Nafou
- Nagbidjabou
- Nahile
- Nakbako
- Nakpate
- Namab
- Namandioure
- Namanjo
- Nambowedo
- Namon
- Namore
- Nampoa
- Nampoak
- Nanaeni
- Nandouta
- Nangbani
- Nanguele
- Nanhal
- Nanioumboul
- Nanjere
- Nankoul
- Naoulema
- Napateou
- Napimbo
- Napitik
- Napoulou
- Narbale
- Nassibiki
- Natako
- Natchamba
- Natchiboura
- Natchikpil
- Natchitipi
- Nawako
- Nawallo
- Naware
- Nayombo
- Niadou
- Niagbangbou
- Niakambou
- Niambi Kara
- Niankale
- Nianpandi
- Niantoule
- Niempenou
- Nikpakpare
- Nimbeolo
- Niniando
- Nintambada
- Nintin
- Nlaman
- Nouhoulme
- Ntchiado

=== O ===
- Onbatedempo
- Oubombo
- Oukredo
- Ounado
- Oussalne
- Ouyombo

=== P ===
- Pabouale
- Padioule
- Pakando
- Paktanga
- Pamboa
- Papoual
- Passao
- Patadou
- Patalabo
- Patieli
- Payoubo
- Pebadjibe
- Pensaka
- Pesside Koundoum
- Petab
- Pipidioule
- Pirinio
- Pitambade
- Pokpon
- Poutamele

=== S ===
- Sadjale
- Sakpale
- Samba
- Sandiado
- Sanpa
- Sanpale
- Sansale
- Sante-Bas
- Sante-Haut
- Sapone
- Sapounoumbo
- Sara
- Sayagali
- Segou
- Seni
- Sichalebe
- Sitiboubou
- Sondina

=== T ===
- Tabale
- Tabalo
- Tabara
- Takoundou
- Takpapie
- Tamabade
- Taman
- Tameme
- Taniamboul
- Taouleba
- Tapoun
- Tayaro
- Tchapossi
- Tchatchaminade
- Tcheoka
- Tchiale
- Tchiorgo
- Tchirkpambo
- Tchitchoa
- Tchotchopola
- Tchoutchoubeni
- Tekfate
- Tema
- Tiakasso
- Tiakbal
- Tiambilibi
- Tiamou
- Tibado
- Tiepakdo
- Tieressou
- Tikakan
- Tiore
- Tioutiou
- Tipakpane
- Tipil
- Tirka
- Titiar
- Toguen
- Tounabopi

=== W ===
- Wabounian
- Wadande
- Wadiado
- Wagam
- Wakade
- Waman
- Wande Nadoum
- Wangbale
- Wango
- Wapambouni
- Weripi

=== Y ===
- Yabido
- Yachiboule
- Yakassi
- Yankassia
- Yapoutando
