= Kabanda =

Kabanda may refer to:

- Kabanda, Togo, a village in the Bassar Prefecture, Kara Region, Togo
- Kabanda (surname)
- Kabanda (film), a 2026 Gujarati film
