= Lanke =

Lanke may refer to:

- Lanke, manor by Bogensee, Brandenburg, Germany, once owned by Joseph Goebbels
- Lanke Cup, Chinese Go competition
- Krumme Lanke, a lake near Berlin
- Lanké, a village in the Kara Region of Togo
- Lånke Municipality, a former municipality in the old Nord-Trøndelag county, Norway
- Ola T. Lånke (born 1948), Norwegian politician
- Lanke (film), a 2021 Indian Kannada-language action drama film
