= Kalanga =

Kalanga may refer to:

- Kalanga people
- Kalanga language
- Kalanga, Iran
- Kalanga, Togo
