= Saponé =

Saponé may refer to several places:

- Saponé Department, Burkina Faso
- Saponé, Burkina Faso, town
- Saponé, Togo, town

== See also ==
- Sapone, surname
