= Bouman =

Bouman may refer to:

- Bouman (surname)
- Bouman, Togo, Togolese village

== See also ==
- Bouwman
