= Diabougou (disambiguation) =

Diabougou may refer to:

== Places ==
=== Senegal ===
- Diabougou (Senegal) - a gold mining village in east Senegal near Mali
- Diabougou (Thiès) - a village in west Senegal known for the "Diabougou Declaration"

=== Togo ===
- Diabougou - a village in north west Togo
