= Tipil =

Tipil can refer to the following places:

- Tipil, Togo, a village in Togo
- Tipil, Turkey, a village in Turkey
