= Katcha =

Katcha may refer to:

- Katcha, Sudan, a village in the Nuba Mountains Region in the south of Sudan
- Katcha, Togo, a village in the Bassar Prefecture in the Kara Region
- Katcha, Nigeria, a Local Government Area in Niger State
- Katcha language, a dialect of Kadugli in Sudan

== Persons ==
- Vahé Katcha (1928–2003), French Armenian novelist, screenwriter and journalist

== See also ==
- Katchal (disambiguation)
