= Kalangula =

Kalangula is a surname. Notable people with the surname include:

- Peter Kalangula (1926–2008), Namibian political and religious leader
- Tuhafeni Kalola (born 1994), Namibian politician

== See also ==
- Kalangala
- Kalanga (disambiguation)
