= Labo =

Labo may refer to:

== Places ==
- Labo, Camarines Norte, Philippines
- Labo, Ozamiz, Philippines
- Labo, Togo

== People ==
- Ken "Labo" Labanowski (born 1959), American-Israeli basketball player

== Other uses ==
- Labo Phowa language (China)
- Labo Ninde language (Vanuatu)
- Nintendo Labo, a gaming and construction toy developed by Nintendo.
