= Manka =

Manka may refer to:

- Manka, a fictional Czech fairy tale character, wife of robber Rumcajs
- Manka, Togo, a village
- Manka, a district in Taiwan now known as the Wanhua District
- Manka (stone), a famous stone that lies on an old tomb in the city of Multan, Punjab, Pakistan
- Manka Dhingra, an Indian-American politician
- Manka (caste) in Gujarat
