= Katchal =

Katchal may refer to:

- Katchal Island, one of India's Nicobar Islands
- Katchal language, an Austroasiatic language spoken in the Nicobar Islands

== See also ==
- Katcha (disambiguation)
- Katchalski (disambiguation)
