= Kasse =

Kasse is both a given name and a surname. Notable people with the name include:

- Kassé Mady Diabaté (1949–2018), Malian singer
- Freda Mubanda Kasse (1943–2020), Ugandan legislator
- Mansour Kasse (born 1992), Senegalese basketball player
- Kódjo Kassé Alphonse (born 1993), Ivorian footballer
- Mamadou Kassé Hann (born 1986), Senegalese hurdler
