= Codex Kingsborough =

16th-century Mesoamerican manuscript

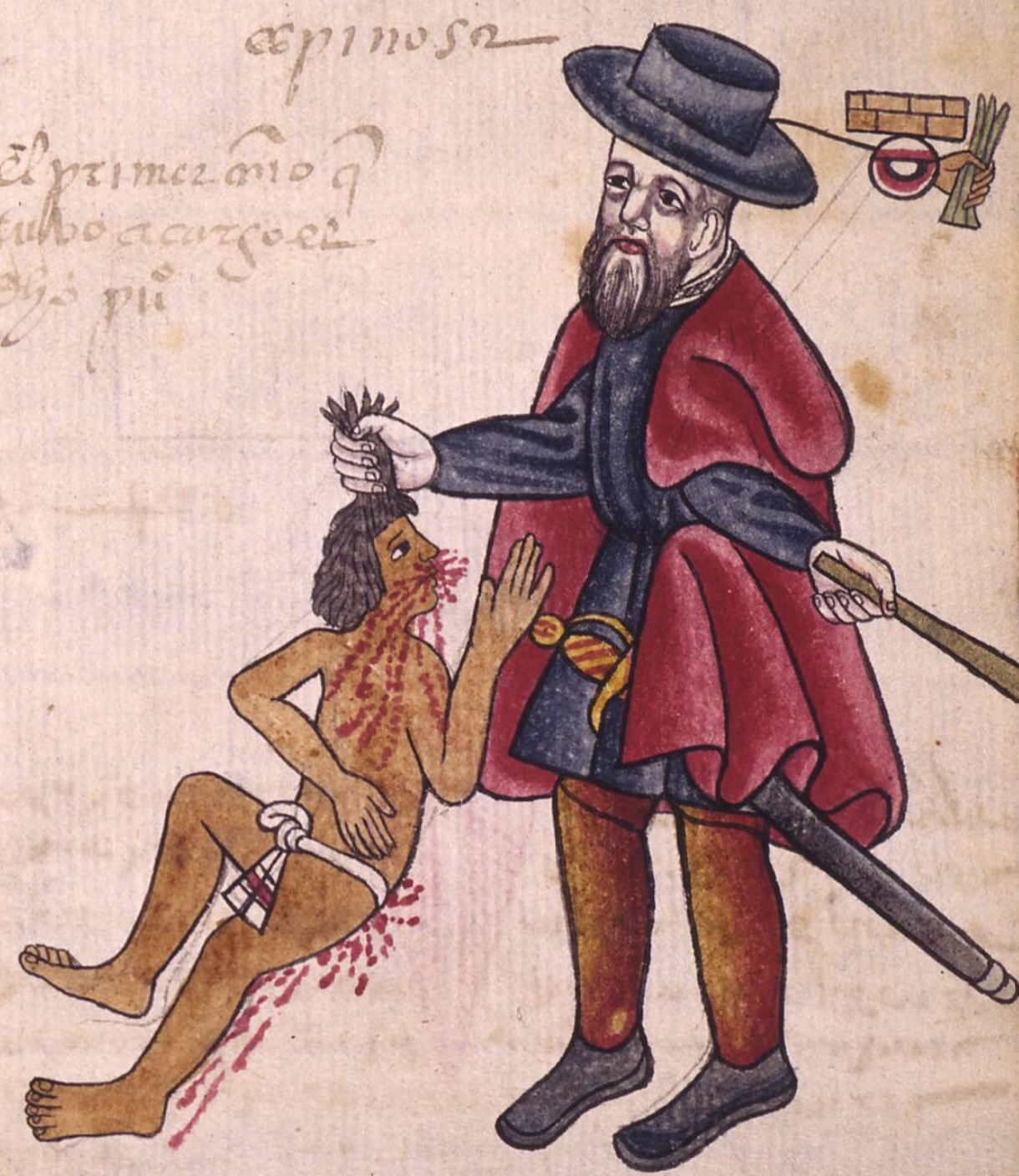
- Folio from the Codex Kingsborough showing indigenous people and Spanish officials.
- Material: European paper
- Size: 29.5 cm x 21.5 cm
- Writing: Pictographic with Spanish commentary
- Created: c. 1550s
- Place: Tepetlaoztoc, Mexico
- Present location: British Museum, London
- Identification: Am2006,Drg.13964
- Registration: 662793

The Codex Kingsborough, also known as the Codex Tepetlaoztoc or the Memorial de los Indios de Tepetlaoztoc, is a 16th-century Mesoamerican pictorial manuscript on European paper. It consists of seventy-two sheets painted to denounce the abuses committed by Spanish encomenderos against the indigenous population of Tepetlaoztoc following the Spanish conquest of the Aztec Empire. It is currently held in the collections of the British Museum.

== Background and purpose ==
The document was created around the 1550s as a formal petition to the King of Spain and the Council of the Indies. The inhabitants of Tepetlaoztoc, a town northeast of Texcoco, commissioned the work to provide evidence in a lawsuit against their encomendero, Juan Velázquez de Salazar. The town's indigenous governor, Luis de Tepada, sought to demonstrate that the tributes demanded by Salazar were unbearable and vastly exceeded those collected by pre-Hispanic rulers.

== Content and structure ==
The codex functions as an illustrated legal argument and is divided into several thematic sections:

- Geography and History: The manuscript begins with two maps of the Tepetlaoztoc territory and details the genealogy and history of its pre-Hispanic lords.
- Comparison of Tribute: It documents the "reasonable" tributes paid to indigenous rulers before the conquest to contrast them with Spanish demands.
- Catalogue of Exactions: A meticulous record of Spanish demands between 1522 and 1556. This includes gold jewelry, obsidian mirrors, emeralds, livestock, firewood, and the labor of tamemes (human carriers).
- Documentation of Violence: The manuscript is notable for its graphic depiction of colonial violence. It features "figures of the dead"—shrouded bodies in horizontal positions—marking deaths caused by overwork, physical punishments, and torture. Images show indigenous people being hanged, whipped, or beaten with sticks for failing to meet tribute quotas.

== Physical description ==
The codex consists of 72 leaves of European paper (144 pages), of which six are blank. It was produced by highly skilled indigenous artists known as tlacuilos. While the work is pictographic, it includes Spanish text explaining the significance of the images to ensure it could be understood by colonial authorities.

== Provenance and namesake ==
The manuscript was acquired in the 19th century by the Irish antiquarian Edward King, Viscount Kingsborough, after whom it is named. Kingsborough was a scholar obsessed with proving a theory that the indigenous peoples of the Americas were the Lost Tribes of Israel.

Kingsborough devoted his life and fortune to publishing his nine-volume magnum opus, Antiquities of Mexico (1831–1848), which featured costly hand-colored facsimiles of various codices, including the Codex Mendoza. Due to the exorbitant costs of this project, Kingsborough fell into debt and was imprisoned in the Sheriff's Prison in Dublin, where he died of typhoid fever in 1837. Following his death, the codex was purchased by a bookseller named Rodd in 1843 and subsequently acquired by the British Museum.
