= Ségou (disambiguation) =

Ségou is a city in Mali.

Ségou may also refer to:

- Ségou, Togo
- Ségou, Senegal
- Ségou Region in Mali, of which Ségou is the capital
- Ségou Cercle, an administrative sub-division of Ségou Region

== See also ==
- Bamana Empire, also called Ségou Empire
