= Wango =

Wango may refer to:

== People ==
- James Wango, Vanuatuan politician
- Lasuba L. Wango, South Sudanese politician

== Places ==
- Wango, Democratic Republic of the Congo, a commune
- Wango, Togo, a village

== See also ==
- Wango Tango, an annual concert in California, United States
- Wango Tango (song), a 1980 song by Ted Nugent
- Wongo (disambiguation)
