= Namon (disambiguation) =

Namon is a village in Bassar Prefecture, Kara Region, Togo.

Namon may refer to:

- Namon Leo Daughtry (born 1940), Republican member of the North Carolina General Assembly
- Namon Washington (1894 – 1971), American baseball outfielder
- Na Mon District in Kalasin Province, Thailand

== See also ==
- Namong, town in the Ashanti Region of Ghana
