= Gangan =

Gangan may refer to:

- GanGan, Japanese title for Aggressors of Dark Kombat
- Gangan (drum), a West African drum
- Gangan, Northern Territory, also known as Gan Gan, a settlement in Arnhem Land, Australia
- Gangan, Togo, a village in Togo, West Africa

== See also ==
- Gan Gan, a village in Argentina
- Gan Gan massacre, a massacre of Aboriginal Australians in 1911
- Gangan Comics, a manga imprint of Square Enix
- Gangan Verlag, an Austrian Australian publisher
- Gungan, fictional species from Star Wars Universe
