= Kperea =

- Location in Togo
- Coordinates: 9°30′N 0°55′E
- Country: Togo
- Region: Kara Region
- Prefecture: Bassar Prefecture
- Time zone: UTC + 0

Kperea is a village in the Bassar Prefecture in the Kara Region of northern Togo. It is about 11 kilometres (7 miles) east-northeast of the larger village of Kabou.
