= Wande =

Wande may refer to:

- Wande, Shandong, a town in Changqing District, Jinan, Shandong, China
- Wande, Yunnan, a town in Wuding County, Yunnan, China
- Wande (river), a river in Hesse, Germany
- Wande, a former stage name of rapper Anike

== See also ==
- Wande Nadoum, a village in Kara Region, Togo
