= Kabanda, Togo =

Kabanda
- Location in Togo
- Coordinates: 9°28′N 0°54′E
- Country: Togo
- Region: Kara Region
- Prefecture: Bassar
- Elevation: 942 ft (287 m)
- Time zone: UTC+0 (UTC)

Kabanda is a village in the Bassar Prefecture in the Kara Region of north-western Togo. The village is located west the towns of Afoou and Kalia and east of Sante Bas.
