= Fougo =

Village in northwest Togo

- Location in Togo
- Coordinates: 9°3′N 0°31′E
- Country: Togo
- Region: Kara Region
- Prefecture: Bassar
- Time zone: UTC + 0

Fougo is a village in the Bassar Prefecture in the Kara Region of north-western Togo, near the border of Ghana.
