= Freda Mubanda Kasse =

Ugandan legislator (1943–2020)

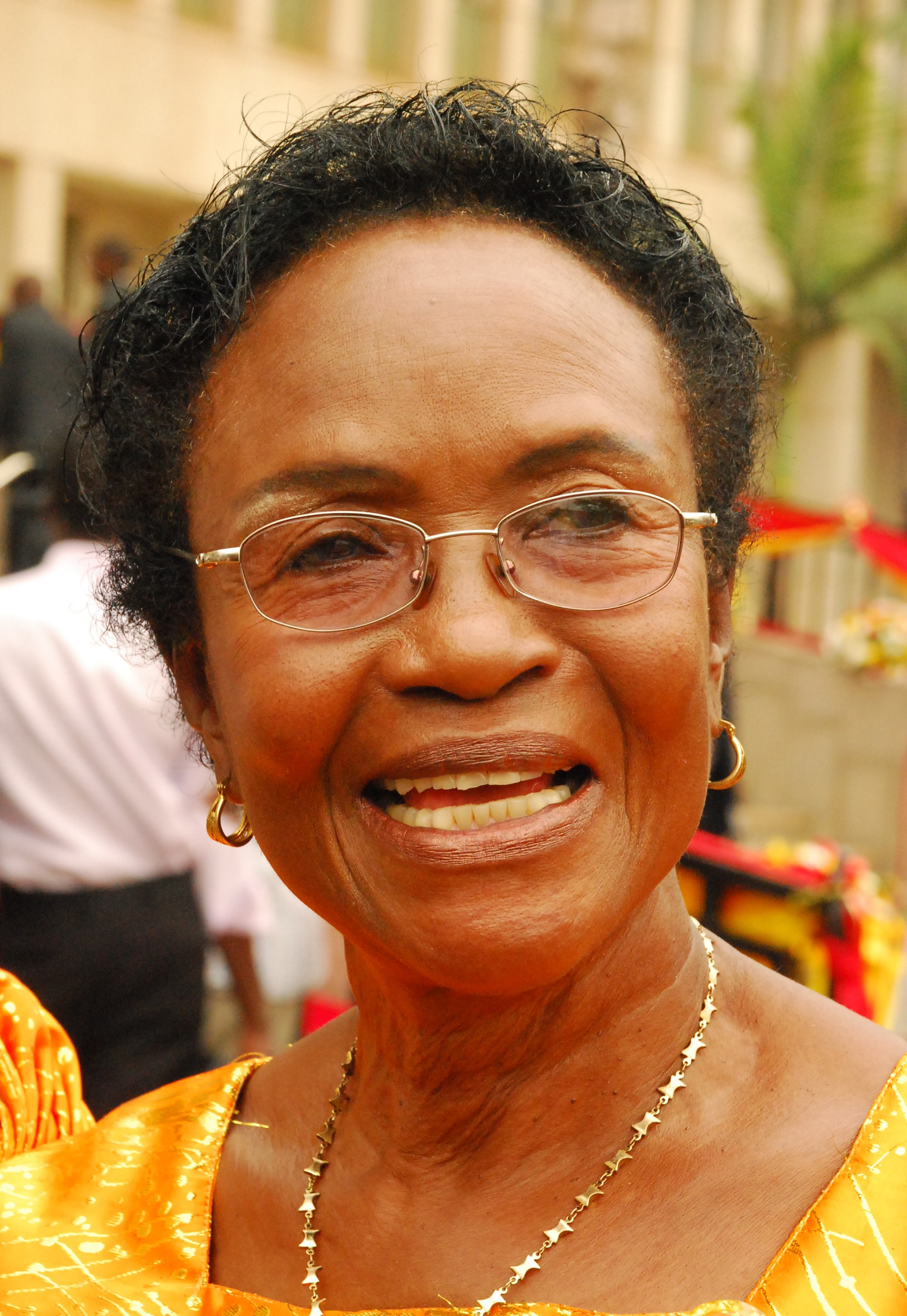
- Freda Mubanda Kasse

Member of the Ugandan Parliament for Masaka district
- In office 2011–2016

Personal details
- Born: August 30, 1943 (age 83)
- Died: December 15, 2020 (age 5) Aga Khan University Hospital, Nairobi
- Citizenship: Uganda
- Party: National Resistance Movement
- Education: Bachelor of Arts degree in political science and history at Makerere University from 1959 to 1964; Diploma in Management from Makerere University in 2004
- Occupation: Politician

Freda Mubanda Kasse Nanziri also known as Mama Masaka, Girl Mubanda (30 August 1943 – 15 December 2020) was a Ugandan legislator. She was the woman MP representative for Masaka district in the Ninth Parliament of Uganda from 2011 to 2016 with affiliation to the NRM party.

== Personal life ==
Freda was born on 30 August 1943 to Yokana Kase and Manjeri Mukebiita in Bukoba, Northern Tanzania. She was the second born among ten children.

Freda died on 15 December 2020 at the age of 76 at Aga Khan hospital in Nairobi, Kenya due to breathing complications.

Freda studied her primary education from Kabwoko Girls School. She joined Gayaza High School and Makerere University where she pursued a Bachelor of Arts degree in political science and history from 1959 to 1964. In 2004, she graduated again from Makerere University with a diploma in management.

From 1964 to 1999, Freda worked with the Uganda's Ministry of Foreign Affairs and with United Nations from 1971 and 1999.

== Political career ==
In 2011, Freda became the woman MP for Masaka district in the ninth parliament after winning the election against Sauda Namaggwa.

In October 2015, Freda survived a boat accident on Lake Victoria as she was moving to Gwamba landing site to campaign in her NRM primaries on 16 October 2015.

On 16 October 2015, Freda was elected the NRM flag bearer for Masaka district woman representative.

She contested for the same position in 2016 and lost to Mary Babirye Kabanda of DP in an election where she got 34,119 votes compared to 51,938 got by her opponent.

Before her death in 2020, Freda served as the chairperson of the NRM women's league in Masaka district.

== See also ==
- List of members of the ninth Parliament of Uganda
- Mary Babirye Kabanda
