= Taouleba =

- Location in Togo
- Coordinates: 9°3′N 0°29′E
- Country: Togo
- Region: Kara Region
- Prefecture: Bassar Prefecture
- Time zone: UTC + 0

Taouleba (originally Taouléba) is a village in Bassar Prefecture in the Kara Region of northwestern Togo.
