= Nambowedo =

- Location in Togo
- Coordinates: 9°41′N 0°36′E
- Country: Togo
- Region: Kara Region
- Prefecture: Bassar Prefecture
- Time zone: UTC + 0

Nambowedo is a village in the Bassar Prefecture in the Kara Region of north-western Togo.
