= Wongo =

Wongo may refer to:

- Wongo (music producer), Australian DJ
- Wongo language, a Bantu language
- Wongo National Park, a nature park in Mali
- The Wild Women of Wongo, a 1958 film

== See also ==
- Wango (disambiguation)
