= Kidjaboum =

- Location in Togo
- Coordinates: 9°47′0″N 0°27′49″E
- Country: Togo
- Region: Kara Region
- Prefecture: Bassar
- Time zone: UTC + 0

Kidjaboum is a village in the Bassar Prefecture in the Kara Region of north-western Togo.
