= Nandouta =

- Location in Togo
- Coordinates: 9°35′55″N 0°24′20″E
- Country: Togo
- Region: Kara Region
- Prefecture: Bassar Prefecture

Population
  - Ethnicities: Bimoba people
- Time zone: UTC + 0

Nandouta is a village in the Bassar Prefecture in the Kara Region of north-western Togo.
