= Sapone =

Sapone is a surname. Notable people with the surname include:

- Marcela Sapone (born 1986), American entrepreneur
- Mike Sapone, American record producer, composer, audio engineer, and mixer

== See also ==
- Saponé (disambiguation)
