= Benata =

- Location in Togo
- Coordinates: 9°7′N 0°30′E
- Country: Togo
- Region: Kara Region
- Prefecture: Bassar
- Time zone: UTC + 0

Benata is a village in the Bassar Prefecture in the Kara Region of north-western Togo.

== Weather ==
Benata, Kara, Togo daily weather:
