= Lidyobilbou =

- Location in Togo
- Coordinates: 9°34′0″N 0°38′0″E
- Country: Togo
- Region: Kara Region
- Prefecture: Bassar Prefecture
- Elevation: 745 ft (227 m)
- Time zone: UTC + 0

Lidyobilbou is a village in the Bassar Prefecture in the Kara Region of northwestern Togo.
