= Boukoukpanbe =

Village in Kara Region, Togo

- Location in Togo
- Coordinates: 9°25′N 0°38′E
- Country: Togo
- Region: Kara Region
- Prefecture: Bassar
- Time zone: UTC + 0

Boukoukpanbe is a village in the Bassar Prefecture of the Kara Region of northwestern Togo.
