= Koutiere =

- Location in Togo
- Coordinates: 9°49′34″N 0°48′11″E
- Country: Togo
- Region: Kara Region
- Prefecture: Bassar Prefecture
- Time zone: UTC + 0

Koutiere is a village in the Bassar Prefecture in the Kara Region of north-western Togo.
