= Kabanda (surname) =

Kabanda is a surname. Notable people with the surname include:

- Bernard Kabanda (1959–1999), Ugandan guitarist
- Elizabeth Kabanda, Ugandan judge
- Ibrahim Kironde Kabanda, Ugandan businessman
- Mary Babirye Kabanda (born 1971), Ugandan politician
