= Ntchiado =

- Location in Togo
- Coordinates: 9°33′N 0°17′E
- Country: Togo
- Region: Kara Region
- Prefecture: Bassar Prefecture
- Time zone: UTC + 0

Ntchiado is a village in the Bassar Prefecture in the Kara Region of north-western Togo. As of 2016, it consisted of six large buildings and several small huts. It lies at an elevation of about 105 meters above sea level.
