= Petab =

- Location in Togo
- Coordinates: 9°43′N 0°22′E
- Country: Togo
- Region: Kara Region
- Prefecture: Bassar Prefecture
- Time zone: UTC + 0

Petab is a village in the Bassar Prefecture part of the Kara Region of north-western Togo.
