= Nangbani =

- Location in Togo
- Coordinates: 9°16′N 0°48′E
- Country: Togo
- Region: Kara Region
- Prefecture: Bassar Prefecture
- Time zone: UTC + 0

Nangbani is a village in the Bassar Prefecture in the Kara Region of north-western Togo.

== Signification of Nangbani and origin of the landlord ==
Nangbani means "in the field". After the descendants of the clan of Nataka-mani left the sacred forest of Dikr, Nangbani, now a big village, was indeed the fields of the Nataka where the youngest son of the first king of the great contemporary Bassar settled with his descendants when he left Kibedipou, a neighborhood on the sacred mountain Barba Bassar.

== Political role of Nangbani in the Kingdom of Grand Bassar ==
Since then, because of the renounced birthright, it is symbolically the elders of Nangbani, precisely the notables from the Tchadoumpou district, who enthrone the King of Bassar; Tchadoumpou has an old diaspora in Kabou Sara and Abiwa, a district of Tchamba.

== Peaceful cohabitation in Nangbani and cousin links through marriage and exogamy ==
The elders of Nangbani welcomed other clans with N'tcham origins and descendants of the Moba-Gourma group that they settled in the pure tradition of fraternity and hospitality; they gave them land for hunting and farming where they live in understanding.

Inter-clan or tribal marriages are the rule. Thus, the links are strengthened between the communities. Maternal uncles and maternal grandparents have a strong influence on the descendants, which contributes to maintaining the bonds of cousinhood so that the kinship is topical. The first names are given according to the clan of the mother or, failing that, that of the father or otherwise a proverb.

== Professor Philippe De Barros and the Great Bassar iron museum ==
According to archaeological excavations, the American anthropologist Professor Philippe de Barros proved by carbon dating that the blast furnaces of Nangbani are more than 2400 years old, the iron metallurgy in Bassar is the second most important in Africa after that of Meroe our origin.

== Common Nubian origin of Bassar, Bassari and Bassa ==
There is a Bassa community around the Adamaoua mountain range and a Bassari community around the Fouta-Djalon mountain range with whom we have distant origins in Meroé precisely around the Djebel Barkal mountain.

== The Nataka clan of Bassar in Togo would be descendants of the Nubian pharaoh Natakamani ==
The name of the Nataka clan comes from our ancestor Pharaoh Nataka-mani, which means in N'tcham NafT-K-gmen, literally "I still want/can do"; Swahili, a language popular in Africa and spoken in Sudan, has kept the same meaning for this ancient word.

So far for proof of this relationship with Natakamani, the descendants of Tchayo, the founder of Tchadoumpou, the first hamlet of Nangbani, invoke everything first during the worship of the ancestors Lintgmen (literally "says we can do") which is a deformation of NafT-K-gmen (I can/want to do) which is nothing but the name of their ancestor pharaoh Nataka-mani. The latter had four sons according to mythology: the eldest was named Tchabagbalombo installed in Boulohou. The younger Tchayo meaning the little Tcha/Patriarch settled in Tchadoumpou in Nangbani. The third Atchol who became Itchol with the wrong pronunciation settled in Akaradè, Aledjo and the Benjamin Gmatchodou settled in Kibedipou.

It is the insecurity which forced the communities of Meroe and surroundings to settle in the depths of Africa where they had their fields, as far as possible from the invaders. After the Westerners, the Arabs will resolve to invade Africa the last ones setting up a colonization then the trans-Saharan slavery and the first ones come back to supplant them with the transatlantic slavery then the colonization of the world.

== Current boundaries of the Great Bassar territory ==
From Malfakassa to Bassar, Baghan, Kagnigbara, Boulohou, Tassi, Agbamassomou, Tchatchakou and Kouida and all the land in the Tabalo region and over, for example, was originally supposed to belong to the Tchawa/Tchida village, i.e. the descendants of Tchadoumpou in Nangbani.

Then, when the Molas arrive at the last, the current entire right part of Tabalo is allocated to their community for hunting up to Na because there are some N'Tchambiya near Nyala River like Nintchè Tribe; to afterwards consider it de facto, as their property, being in number and strength.

And recently, from 1970, consider all the land as their property, by bringing together a few chiefs (most of whom are Molas or allies) to have them sign that all the land assigned to them belonged to them. In reality, in the tradition the land belongs to the whole village which only has the right of effective enjoyment, collectively or individually; land cannot be sold.

No one or group of individuals has the right to individually and legally appropriate it (i.e., have it registered in their name).

However, inside the village, there is the core of the true original owners of the land, who receive a small portion (most often symbolic) as tribute following the collection from the rivers of (for example) bunches of palm trees, and oil, but all that is in the past.

This culture continued in few villages.
