= Bougab =

- Location in Togo
- Coordinates: 9°40′N 0°45′E
- Country: Togo
- Region: Kara Region
- Prefecture: Bassar
- Time zone: UTC + 0

Bougab is a village in the Bassar Prefecture in the Kara Region of north-western Togo. The populated area has a terrain estimated to be approximately 198m above sea level.
