= Bikpandib =

- Location in Togo
- Coordinates: 9°33′N 0°22′E
- Country: Togo
- Region: Kara Region
- Prefecture: Bassar
- Time zone: UTC + 0

Bikpandib is a village in the Bassar Prefecture in the Kara Region of northwestern Togo. The distance from Bikpandib to Lome is around 530 km (330 mi).
