= Badao =

- Location in Togo
- Coordinates: 9°27′N 0°58′E
- Country: Togo
- Region: Kara Region
- Prefecture: Bassar
- Time zone: UTC + 0

Badao is a village in the Bassar Prefecture in the Kara Region of north-western Togo. It is located 229 mi (369 km) north of Lomé, the country's capital.
