= Bikoutikpandi =

- Location in Togo
- Coordinates: 9°15′N 0°45′E
- Country: Togo
- Region: Kara Region
- Prefecture: Bassar
- Time zone: UTC + 0

Bikoutikpandi is a village in the Bassar Prefecture in the Kara Region of north-western Togo.
