= Natchamba =

- Village
- Location in Togo
- Coordinates: 9°24′N 0°35′E
- Country: Togo
- Region: Kara Region
- Prefecture: Bassar Prefecture
- Elevation: 636 ft (194 m)
- Time zone: UTC + 0

Natchamba is a village in the Bassar Prefecture in the Kara Region of north-western Togo.
