= Namore =

- Location in Togo
- Coordinates: 9°30′N 0°35′E
- Country: Togo
- Region: Kara Region
- Prefecture: Bassar Prefecture
- Elevation: 495 ft (151 m)
- Time zone: UTC + 0

Namore is a village in the Bassar Prefecture in the Kara Region of north-western Togo. The village is located approximately 151 meters above sea level.
