= Lie, Togo =

- Location in Togo
- Coordinates: 9°36′N 0°42′E
- Country: Togo
- Region: Kara Region
- Prefecture: Bassar Prefecture
- Time zone: UTC + 0

Lie is a village in the Bassar Prefecture in the Kara Region of north-western Togo. The population is predominantly formed by the Moba people.
