= Guérin-Kouka, Bassar =

Guérin-Kouka
- Guérin-Kouka
- Location in Togo
- Coordinates: 9°41′26″N 0°36′41″E
- Country: Togo
- Region: Kara Region
- Prefecture: Bassar
- Time zone: UTC + 0

Guérin-Kouka is a village in the Dankpen Prefecture in the Kara Region of north-western Togo.
