= Tabara, Togo =

- Location in Togo
- Coordinates: 9°29′N 0°36′E
- Country: Togo
- Region: Kara Region
- Prefecture: Bassar Prefecture
- Time zone: UTC + 0

Tabara, Togo is a village in the Bassar Prefecture in the Kara Region of north-western Togo.

the Region of Bassar is / Bandjeli testify for them the distant work of Iron in the region. Several old blast furnaces have been preserved (Nangbeni-Bassar).
