= Ségou, Togo =

- Location in Togo
- Coordinates: 9°58′N 0°23′E
- Country: Togo
- Region: Kara Region
- Prefecture: Bassar Prefecture

Area
  - Total: 20 sq mi (52 km^{2})
- Elevation: 1,263 ft (385 m)

Population (2010)
  - Total: 785
  - Ethnicities density: 39/sq mi (15/km^{2})
- Time zone: UTC + 0

Ségou is a village in Togo.
