= Toguen =

Village in northern Togo

Coordinates: 9°50′N 0°42′E

Toguen is a village in northern Togo.
