= Haba Station =

Haba Station (羽場駅) is the name of two train stations in Japan:

- Haba Station (Gifu)
- Haba Station (Nagano)
