= Kalanga, Iran =

Kalanga کلنگا
- Village
- Location within Iran
- Coordinates: 36°33′00″N 52°34′00″E
- Country: Iran
- Province: Mazandaran
- County: Babol
- Bakhsh: Lalehabad
- Rural District: Karipey

Population (2006)
  - Total: 454
- Time zone: UTC+3:30 (IRST)
  - Summer (DST): UTC+4:30 (IRDT)

Kalanga (Persian: کلنگا, also Romanized as Kalangā; also known as Kalangāh) is a village in Karipey Rural District, Lalehabad District, Babol County, Mazandaran Province, Iran. At the 2006 census, its population was 454, in 103 families.
