= Lanké =

- Location in Togo
- Coordinates: 9°37′N 0°48′E
- Country: Togo
- Region: Kara Region
- Prefecture: Bassar Prefecture
- Time zone: UTC + 0

Lanké is a village in Togo.
