= Nagbidjabou =

- Location in Togo
- Coordinates: 9°39′N 0°34′E
- Country: Togo
- Region: Kara Region
- Prefecture: Dankpen
- Time zone: UTC + 0

Nagbidjabou is a village in the Dankpen prefecture in the Kara Region of north-western Togo.
