= Katchalski =

Katchalski may refer to:

- Aharon Katzir-Katchalsky, or Aharon Katzir (1914–1972), Israeli pioneer in the study of the electrochemistry of biopolymers
  - Katchalsky (crater), a crater that lies on the far side of the Moon, and is named after scientist Aharon Katzir-Katchalsky
  - Katchalski-Katzir algorithm, algorithm for docking of rigid molecules, developed by Ephraim Katchalski/Katzir
