= Wande Nadoum =

- Location in Togo
- Coordinates: 10°1′N 0°24′E
- Country: Togo
- Region: Kara Region
- Prefecture: Bassar Prefecture
- Time zone: UTC + 0

Wande Nadoum is a village in the Bassar Prefecture in the Kara Region of north-western Togo.
