= Gangan, Togo =

- Location in Togo
- Coordinates: 9°2′N 0°38′E
- Country: Togo
- Region: Kara Region
- Prefecture: Bassar
- Time zone: UTC + 0

Gangan is a village in the Bassar Prefecture in the Kara Region of north-western Togo.

== See also ==
- Togo
