= Katcha, Togo =

Katcha
- Location in Togo
- Coordinates: 9°17′N 0°39′E
- Country: Togo
- Region: Kara Region
- Prefecture: Bassar
- Time zone: UTC + 0

Katcha is a village in the Bassar Prefecture in the Kara Region of north-western Togo.

== Ecology ==
This locale was historically a habitat for the endangered African wild dog, Lycaon pictus, although pressures of the expanding human population render the existence of this species problematic in Katcha.
