= Kabou =

- Location in Togo
- Coordinates: 9°27′N 0°49′E
- Country: Togo
- Region: Kara Region
- Prefecture: Bassar
- Time zone: UTC + 0

Kabou is a village in the Bassar Prefecture in the Kara Region of north-western Togo. Due to its central location, it is used as a marketplace where people travel in from Ghana, Bassar, Kara, and Guérin-Kouka to sell goods. Formerly Kabou was known for iron exporting out of a mine in Banjeli, which is about 20 km outside Kabou, until it was later privatized.

== History ==
The city was founded by Oukpan, also known as Le Guerrier, The Hunter. The local language is Bassar.

== Paysage ==
Kabou offers a panoramic sight on the nature, the mountains, the forests, the rivers. Also, the stars are clearly visible due to the lack of light pollution.
