= Habas =

Habas may refer to:

- Habas, Landes, a commune in France in the Landes department
- Habas, Yemen, a village in Yemen in the Ṣan‘ā’ governorate
- Peeled fava beans
- Bracha Habas (1900–1968), Lithuanian-Israeli journalist
- Stefan Habas (born 1971), Polish skier
