= Diabirdo =

- Location in Togo
- Coordinates: 9°51′N 0°38′E
- Country: Togo
- Region: Kara Region
- Prefecture: Bassar
- Time zone: UTC + 0

Diabirdo is a village in the Bassar Prefecture in the Kara Region of north-western Togo.
