= Mary Babirye Kabanda =

Ugandan politician

Member of Parliament
- Incumbent
- Assumed office 2016
- Constituency: Masaka District

Personal details
- Born: 23 November 1971 (age 54) Masaka, Uganda
- Spouse: Married
- Education: St Joseph Bikira Girls School (PLE, 1985); St Edward SS Bukuumi (UCE, 1989); St Aloysius SS Bwanda (UACE, 1992); Makerere University (B.A. Economics, 1995; Postgraduate Degree in Education, 1996); Uganda Martyrs University (Advanced Diploma in Education Management, 2001; B.A. Microfinance and Community Development, 2010; M.A. Local Governance and Human Rights, 2016)
- Occupation: Politician, Teacher
- Profession: Teacher

Mary Babirye Kabanda (born 23 November 1971) is a Ugandan politician, and teacher. She was born in Masaka and is currently a member of the 10th parliament as the Masaka district MP. Mary Babirye Kabanda is married.

== Background and education ==
In her early life, Kabanda went to St Joseph Bikira Girls school in 1985 for her Primary Living Exams, St Edward SS Bukuumi for her Uganda Certificate of Education in 1989, St Aloysius SS Bwanda for her Uganda Advanced Certificate of Education in 1992, Makerere University for her bachelor's degree in Economics in 1995, postgraduate Degree in Education 1996 and Uganda Martyrs University for her Advanced Diploma in Advanced Education Management in 2001, Bachelor's degree in Microfinance and Community Development in 2010 and Master's degree in Arts in Local Governance and Human Rights in 2016.

== Career ==
Kabanda is a teacher by profession, was a Head teacher at St Joseph SS Kigando, Kilboga from 1995 to 1998, St Peters SS Busubizi Mityana from 1998 to 2000, Blessed sacrament SS Kimanya Masaka from 2000 to 2013, a Director at St Jude SS Masaka 2013 to date and currently a member of Parliament in the Parliament of Uganda 2016 to date.

=== Teaching and education sector work ===
Kabanda has worked in school leadership roles. Daily Monitor reported head teacher appointments in Kiboga District (1995–1998), Mityana District (1998–2000), and Masaka (2000–2013). She has also the proprietor and director of St Jude Secondary School in Kyabakuza, Masaka City.

=== Parliament and elections ===
Kabanda won the Masaka District Woman Member of Parliament seat in the 2016 general election. In July 2016, the High Court in Masaka dismissed an election petition challenging her victory, after the petitioner alleged voter bribery and falsification of results; Uganda Radio Network reported that the court dismissed the petition for lack of evidence and published vote totals cited in the judgement (Kabanda 51,938; Freda Nanziri Kase Mubanda 34,119; Rukiya Nakigudde 3,878).

In March 2017, the Court of Appeal upheld the Masaka High Court decision confirming Kabanda as the validly elected Masaka district woman MP, according to The Independent.

Daily Monitor later reported that in the 2021 elections for Masaka City Woman Representative, Kabanda placed second behind Juliet Nakakande (National Unity Platform), citing vote totals for the top candidates (Nakakande 37,024 votes; Kabanda 18,203 votes).

=== Party roles ===
Kabanda has served as the national treasurer of the Democratic Party (DP).

== Education advocacy and philanthropy ==
Daily Monitor profiled Kabanda in 2022 for education-related support schemes linked to her schools, reporting support to vulnerable learners and sponsorship for students in tertiary institutions. Makerere University News has also referred to her as supporting disadvantaged students through an NGO initiative.

Uganda Radio Network reported her public comments in March 2023, in her capacity as an education stakeholder and school director, calling for government support and instructional materials to help private schools implement Uganda’s new secondary curriculum.
