= Le Meurice =

Luxury hotel in Paris

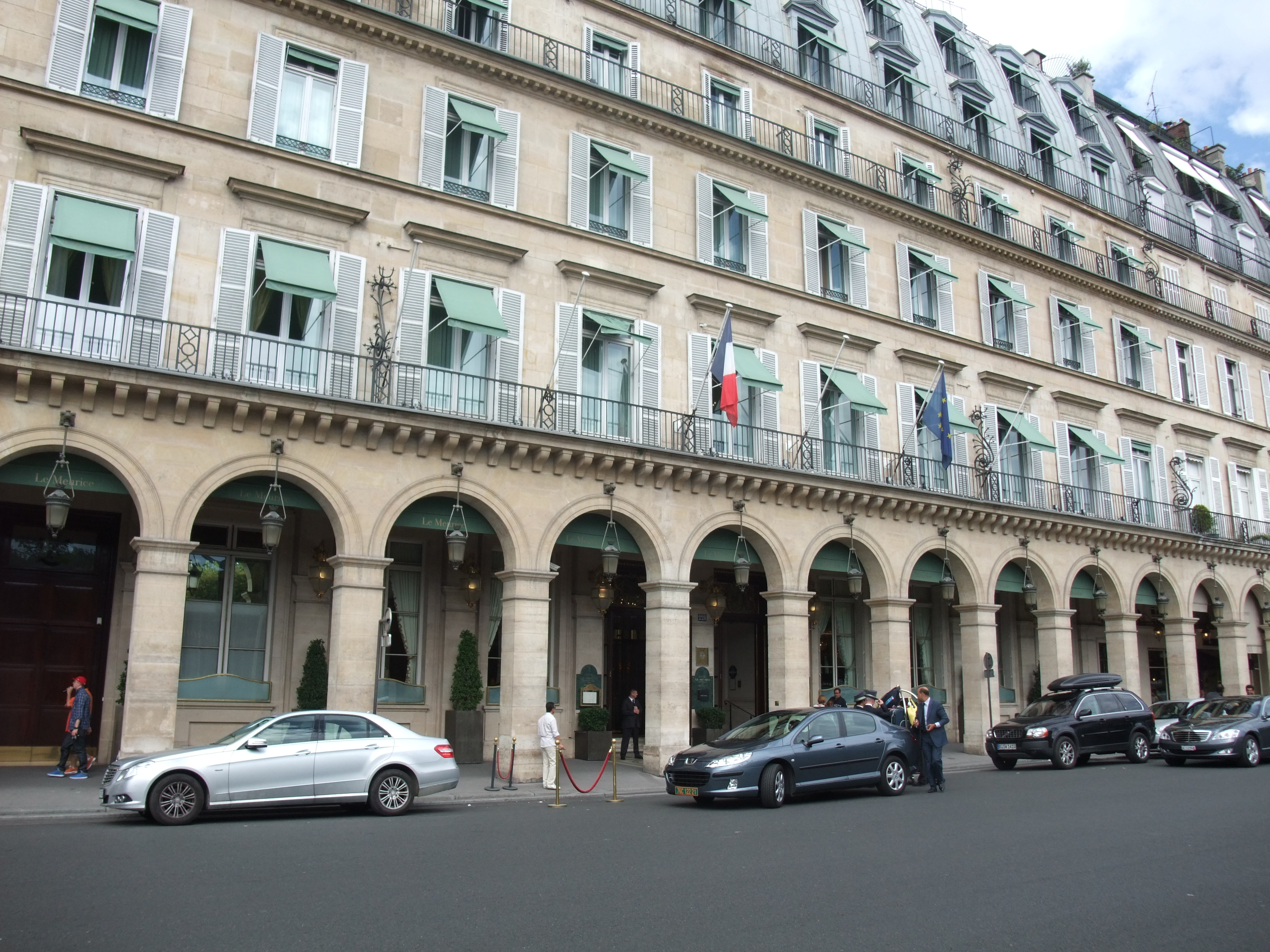

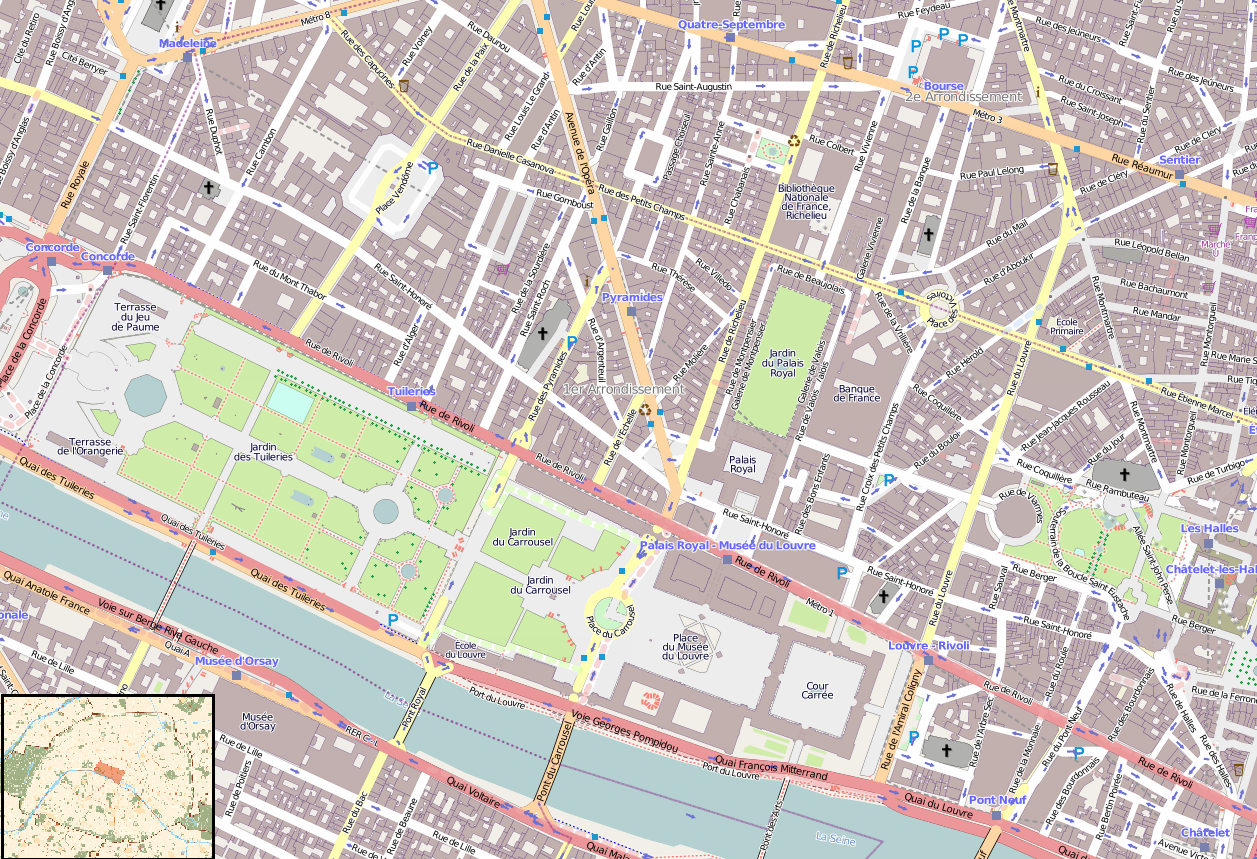
- Location within 1st arrondissement of Paris

General information
- Type: Luxury hotel
- Classification: ("Palace" grade)
- Location: Paris (1st arrondissement), France
- Coordinates: 48°51′55″N 2°19′42″E
- Opened: 1815
- Owner: Brunei Investment Agency
- Operator: Dorchester Collection

Website
- Official website

Le Meurice (French pronunciation: [otɛl møʁis]) is a Brunei-owned five-star luxury hotel in the 1st arrondissement of Paris opposite the Tuileries Garden, between Place de la Concorde and the Musée du Louvre on the Rue de Rivoli. From the Rue de Rivoli, it stretches to the Rue du Mont Thabor. The hotel was opened in 1815. It received the "Palace" distinction from the French government in 2011. Le Meurice is owned and operated by the Dorchester Collection, a luxury hotel operator based in London. The hotel has a staff of over 400 and houses 160 rooms decorated in the Louis XVI style, which start at US$1,235 per night.

== History ==
=== Early years ===
In the mid-18th century, the French postmaster, Charles-Augustin Meurice (born 1738), understood that English tourists wanted to be on the continent with the comforts and conveniences they were used to at home. In 1771, Meurice opened a coach inn on Rue Edmond Roche in Calais, the Hôtel Meurice de Calais. In 1815, he opened the Hôtel Meurice in Paris, originally located at 223 Rue Saint-Honoré. Le Meurice offered everything to make life easier for the traveler; apartments of various sizes, areas set aside where travelers could sit and talk, specialty laundry soap, English-speaking staff, and currency exchange, among other amenities. The hotel advertised, "For an English traveler, no hotel in Paris offers more benefits than Le Meurice."

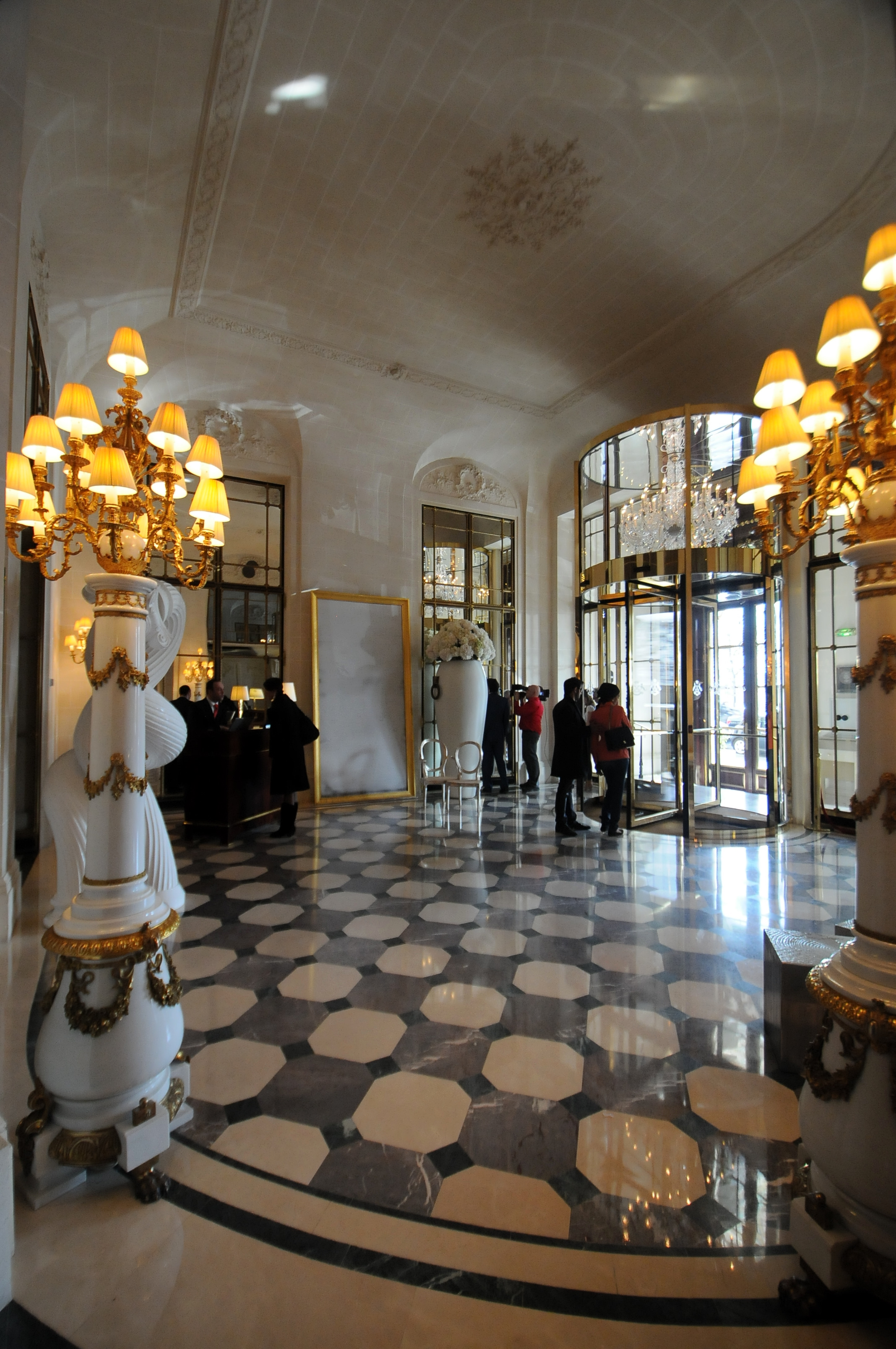
Hotel lobby

In 1835, Le Meurice moved from Rue Saint Honore to its current location on the Rue de Rivoli, in a new luxurious building, close to the Tuileries Palace. A wealthy clientele followed, and during the July Monarchy to the French Third Republic, Le Meurice welcomed the high society of the time, who appreciated the quality of service, the refinement of the rooms and lounges, as well as the exceptional location of the hotel in the heart of Paris, near luxury boutiques.

In the latter half of the 19th century, Henri-Joseph Scheurich was its proprietor and, in 1865, he is documented as managing the hotel under the London and Paris Hotel Company. He is mentioned again in 1867, at which time the hotel offered large and small apartments, or single bedrooms; and featured a reading room and smoking room. In 1891, the hotel had electric lights, new plumbing, and accommodated 200 guests; Scheurich was still the proprietor.

=== Early 20th century ===
In the early 20th century, one of the shareholders of the new company was Arthur Millon, owner of Café de la Paix and restaurants Weber and Ledoyen. To compete with the Ritz, which opened in 1902, Millon turned to a great Swiss hotelier, Frédéric Schwenter. Under these two men, Le Meurice was enlarged by the addition of the Metropole Hotel, located on Rue de Castiglione. Then, with the exception of the façade, the hotel was rebuilt under the guidance of the architect Henri Paul Nénot, winner of the Grand Prix de Rome. For interior decoration, especially for rooms on the ground floor, the Louis XVI style prevailed. The rooms were equipped with modern, tiled bathrooms, telephone, and electric butler bells. Public rooms were relocated and reinforced concrete was added for privacy, and the elevator was a copy of the sedan chair used by Marie Antoinette. Other additions included the grand salon Pompadour with white trimmings, a restaurant with marble pilasters and gilded bronzes as a living tribute to the Peace of Versailles, and the wrought iron canopy over the lobby.

=== World War II ===
Between September 1940 and August 1944, the hotel was requisitioned by the German occupation authorities. In August 1944, the Meurice became the headquarters of General Dietrich von Choltitz, the military governor of Paris. von Choltitz famously disobeyed Hitler's commands to level the city of Paris. Hitler's reported question screamed to von Choltitz over a Hotel Meurice telephone, "Is Paris burning?", later served as the title of a best-selling book about the liberation of Paris, and the 1966 film which was shot partly at the Meurice.

=== Recent history ===
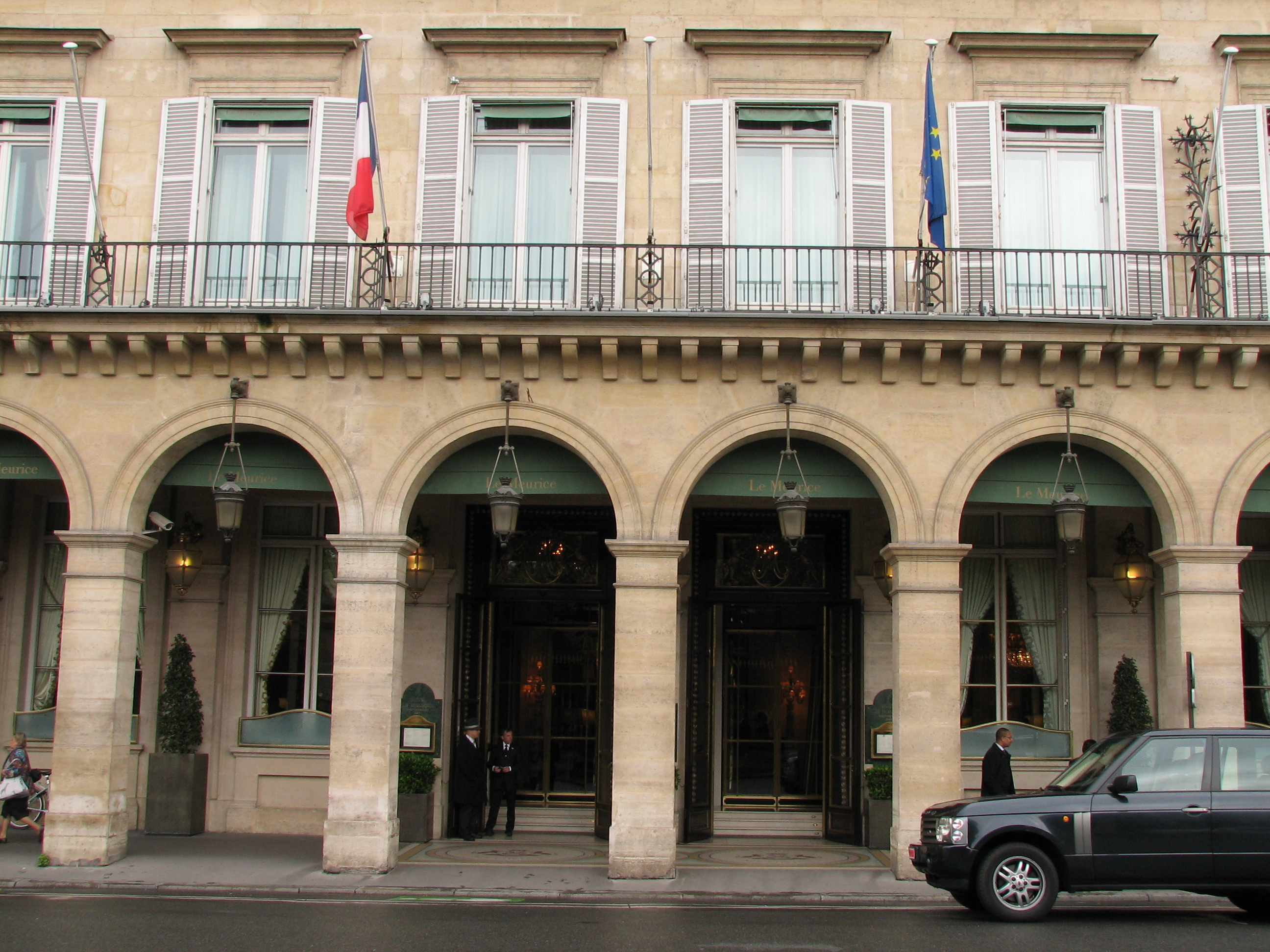

During its long existence, Le Meurice has experienced several transfers of ownership as well as major refurbishments: one from 1905 to 1907, the second in 1947 and most recently in 1998. Each of these renovations included modernization and beautification of the hotel.

The Société du Grand Hôtel, which also owned the nearby Le Grand Hotel and Hotel Prince de Galles, sold the three properties in 1972 to the Italian CIGA Hotels chain. CIGA then sold them in 1978 to Limnico, a subsidiary of Roger Tamraz's First Arabian Corporation. Limnico resold the properties just a year later, in October 1979, to Maxwell Joseph's UK-based Grand Metropolitan Hotels. When Grand Met bought Inter-Continental Hotels a year later, in 1981, they made the Meurice part of that chain. Grand Met sold the Meurice back to CIGA in 1984 for around US$100 million. CIGA was, by this point, controlled by the Aga Khan, the spiritual head of the Ismaili Muslim sect. In 1994, the Aga Khan, faced with extreme financial difficulties, sold the CIGA chain to ITT Sheraton. However, at the urging of his senior hospitality advisor, Paul Ruffino, he maintained ownership of the Meurice until 1997, when he sold the hotel to the Sultan of Brunei's Brunei Investment Agency, who made it part of the company's Dorchester Collection.

The Meurice underwent another round of extensive renovation and restoration between 1998 and 2000. In 2007, Le Meurice began renovations under Philippe Starck and Franka Holtmann, General Manager. Its decor is in the style of Louis XVI. The renovations also included a campaign led by Jean-Loup Roubert and the architect Nicolas Papamiltiades, which changed certain areas of the building for technical reasons, with the creation of an underground infrastructure for heating and cooling, and for aesthetic purposes. New reception rooms have been created on the ground floor, while the main entrance was moved to Rue de Rivoli. Decorations, mosaics and moldings were the subject of extensive renovation by skilled craftsmen.

The hotel is now owned and managed by the Brunei Investment Agency's Dorchester Collection. Le Meurice joined the collection in 1997 which includes nine other luxury hotels: The Beverly Hills Hotel and Hotel Bel-Air in Los Angeles, The Dorchester and 45 Park Lane in London, Coworth Park in Ascot, the Hôtel Plaza Athénée in Paris, the Principe di Savoia in Milan, Hotel Eden in Rome, and Le Richemond in Geneva.

The French ministry of economy recognized Le Meurice with palace distinction in 2011 on the first official list of government-approved palaces in France.

== Restaurants and bars ==
Le Meurice has two main restaurants. Restaurant le Meurice overlooks the Tuileries Garden and was run by 3 Michelin star chef Yannick Alléno until 2013 when he resigned and 3 Michelin star chef Alain Ducasse was named head chef. Restaurant Le Dali is situated under a 145 square metre (1560 square feet) canvas painted by Ara Starck, the daughter of Philippe Starck. It also has the cocktail bar Bar 228 with leather armchairs and dark woodwork furnishings.

== Notable patrons ==
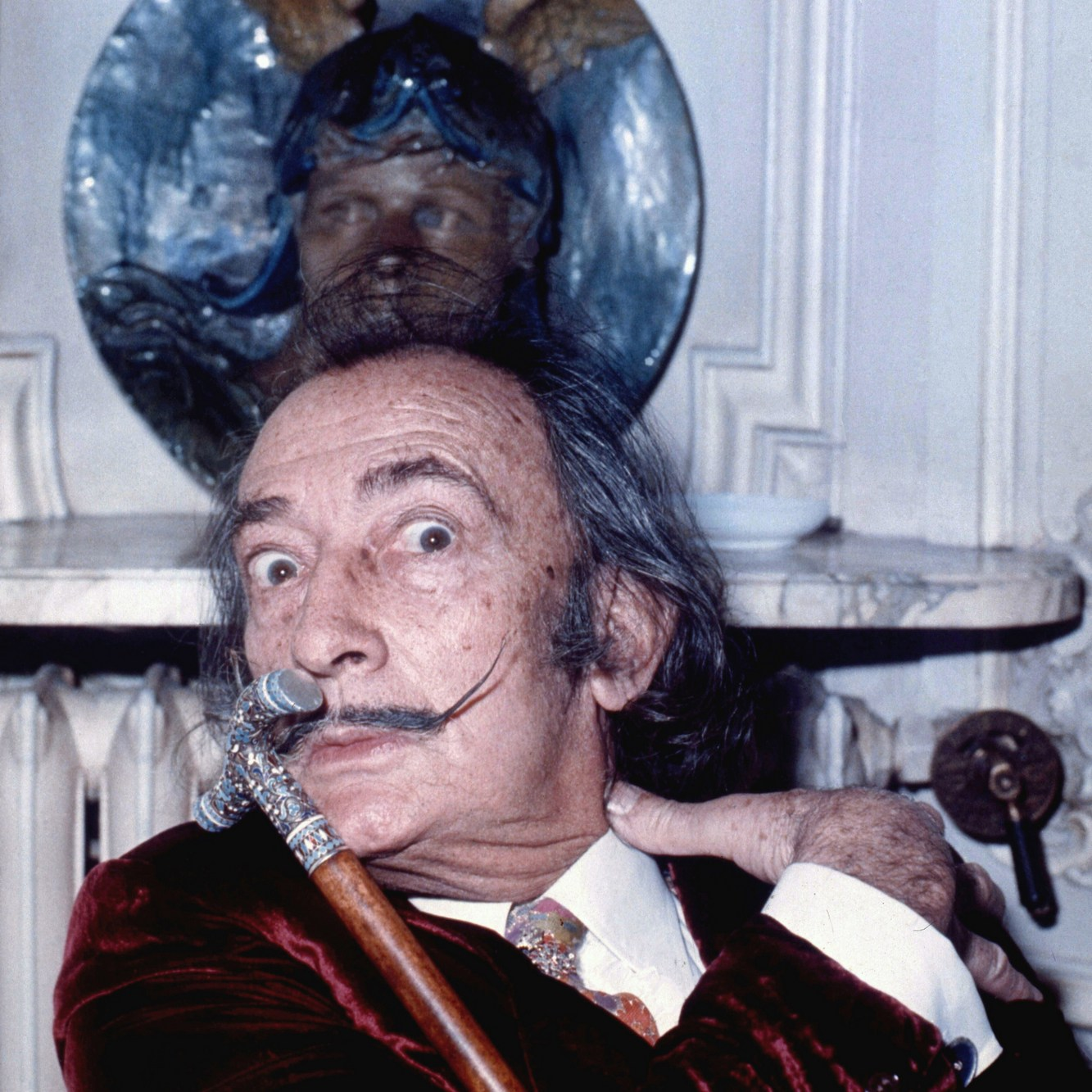
Salvador Dalí, pictured at the Hôtel Meurice, spent about a month of each year over 30 years in the old Royal Suite Alphonse XIII.

The hotel has accommodated numerous kings, sultans, and other eminent guests. Its location near the seat of government was one of the reasons prompting Miss Howard, mistress and patron of the future Napoleon III, to settle at Le Meurice during Napoleon's stay in the capital. The first monarch to have stayed at the new Meurice in Paris was King Alfonso XIII of Spain. When he was ousted in 1931, the fallen monarch sought refuge at the Meurice and set up the seat of his government in exile. Following him, the Prince of Wales, the kings of Italy, Belgium, Greece, Bulgaria, Denmark, Montenegro, the Shah of Persia, and the Bey of Tunis stayed at the Meurice. Business leaders such as Rockefeller, politicians like French President Gaston Doumergue, who sometimes dined with his wife Jeanne-Marie Graves, President of the United States Franklin D. Roosevelt, Count Ciano, the British Prime Minister Anthony Eden, Wilbur Wright, and others were well known guests. The Duke and Duchess of Windsor stayed at Le Meurice on their return from honeymoon in September 1937, and where they announced their intention to tour Nazi Germany later the same year.

Salvador Dalí spent about a month of each year over 30 years in the old Royal Suite, (spanning Rooms 106 and 108) which had been used by King Alfonso XIII. Others included the Wright Brothers, Giorgio de Chirico, Rudyard Kipling, Edmond Rostand, Gabriele D'Annunzio, Paul Morand, Walter Lippmann, Yehudi Menuhin, Seiji Ozawa, Anne-Sophie Mutter and Plácido Domingo. Past guests also include film stars and directors such as Franco Zeffirelli, Liza Minnelli, Fernandel, Mike Todd, Eddie Fisher, Ginger Rogers, Yul Brynner, Bette Midler, Elizabeth Taylor and Richard Burton. The socialite Mata Hari stayed at Le Meurice on several occasions. The manager of the Meurice once even obtained a court order forcing Mata Hari to pay outstanding fees. In December 2006, the President of Algeria, Abdelaziz Bouteflika, after surgery at the military hospital of Val de Grace, continued his recovery at the Meurice. Housed in a presidential suite, the head of the Algerian state gave a television interview from there on 17 December; he left the Meurice on 31 December to return home. In 2011, Jay-Z and Kanye West recorded their hit "Niggas in Paris" at Hôtel Meurice for the Watch The Throne album. Chef Eunji Lee served as its head pastry chef.

== In the media ==
The hotel has been a setting for several films, including Is Paris Burning? (1966, René Clément), Julia (1977, Fred Zinnemann), The Blood of Others (1984, Claude Chabrol), Mata Hari (1985, Curtis Harrington), Angel-A (2006, Luc Besson), Notre univers impitoyable (2007, Léa Fazer), Les Femmes de l'ombre (2008, Jean-Paul Salomé), Demain dès l'aube (Denis Dercourt) and La folle histoire d’amour de Simon Eskenazy (Jean-Jacques Zilbermann) in 2009, Midnight in Paris (Woody Allen) and W.E (Madonna) in 2010 and Diplomacy in 2014.
