= Bier (disambiguation) =

A bier is a flat frame used to carry a corpse to burial.

Bier or Biers may also refer to:

== People ==
- Bier (surname)

== Fictional characters and places ==
- D'Anna Biers or Number Three (Battlestar Galactica), a Cylon in the re-imagined Battlestar Galactica television series
- Riley Biers, a vampire in the Twilight novel series
- Biers, a pub in Ankh-Morpork in Terry Pratchett's Discworld novels

== Places ==
- Bier, Maryland, an unincorporated community
- Bier Point, Antarctica

== Other uses ==
- Biological indicator evaluation resistometer
- Bier is the German word for beer

== See also ==
- Bier block, a technique for intravenous regional anesthesia named after August Bier
- Bier spots, small, light macules occurring in cases of Marshall–White syndrome
- Biar (disambiguation)
- Bere (disambiguation)
- Beer (disambiguation)
