= Christopher Cowdray =

Zimbabwean-British hotel manager (born 1955)

- Born: 1955 (age 70–71); Southern Rhodesia (now Zimbabwe)
- Education: Falcon College
- Alma mater: Columbia University
- Occupation: CEO of The Dorchester Collection
- Years active: 2007– present

Christopher Cowdray (born 1955) is a Zimbabwean-born British hotel manager. He is the chief executive officer of the Dorchester Collection, a hotel operator in Europe and the US.

== Early life ==
Christopher Cowdray was born in 1955 in Zimbabwe.

He was educated at Falcon College in Zimbabwe. He received a degree in hotel management in his home country before attending Columbia University in New York City. After graduating from the Columbia Business School's Executive Program.

== Career ==
Cowdray managed hotels in Africa, Asia, Australia, the Middle East and the United Kingdom. In the United Kingdom, Cowdray was previously the managing director at London's Claridge's. In 2004, Cowdray became the general manager at The Dorchester Hotel. Cowdray was appointed to chief executive officer of The Dorchester Collection in November 2007.

The Dorchester Collection is owned by the Dorchester Group Ltd. After managing The Dorchester, one of the ten hotels included in the Dorchester Collection, Cowdray became the CEO of the luxury hotel operation in 2007. In 2008, following his appointment to CEO, Cowdray added Hotel Bel-Air to the Dorchester Collection. Since then, the New York Palace Hotel was sold off, but the Dorchester Collection has expanded with additions such as Le Richemond in Geneva, Coworth Park and 45 Park Lane in England, and Hotel Eden in Rome.

In 2013, Cowdray was awarded the Lifetime Achievement Award at the European Hospitality Awards for his achievements in the hotel community with the Dorchester collection.
