= BIA =

BIA or Bia may refer to:

== Acronym or abbreviation ==
=== Organizations and companies ===
- Board of Immigration Appeals, an American immigration appellate court
- Bohemia Interactive Australia, a computer simulation software company
- Border and Immigration Agency, a defunct British government agency
- Braille Institute of America, a non-profit organization headquartered in Los Angeles
- Brazilian Intelligence Agency
- Bridgeport International Academy, a U.S. high school
- British Institute in Amman, a British research institute in Amman, Jordan
- British Island Airways, a defunct British airline
- Brunei Investment Agency, a corporation under the Government of Brunei
- Bureau of Indian Affairs, an American government agency
- Burma Independence Army, a name for the predecessor of the Burma National Army in World War II
- Bus Industries of America
- Security and Intelligence Agency (Serbia) (Serbian: Bezbednosno Informativna Agencija), Serbian security and intelligence agency
- Beijing Institute of Aerodynamics, a former research organization in Beijing, China

=== Airports ===
- Baghdad International Airport
- Bahrain International Airport
- Bandaranaike International Airport
- Bangkok International Airport (disambiguation)
- Bangor International Airport, Bangor, Maine
- Bastia – Poretta Airport (IATA: BIA), on the island of Corsica
- Beirut International Airport
- Belfast International Airport
- Bengaluru International Airport, Bangalore, India
- Birmingham Airport, Birmingham, England
- Birmingham–Shuttlesworth International Airport, Birmingham, Alabama, United States
- Blackpool International Airport, Lancashire, England
- Bristol Airport
- Brussels International Airport

=== Other acronyms ===
- Bankruptcy and Insolvency Act, the statute that regulates the law on bankruptcy and insolvency in Canada
- Basic indicator approach, a set of operational risk measurement techniques for banking institutions
- Behavioural investigative advisor, a British term for police psychologist
- Bilateral Immunity Agreement, a type of treaty involving the United States
- Bioelectrical impedance analysis, a way to measure body fat using electrical impulses
- Burned-in address, a globally unique network address assigned to a device at time of manufacture
- Business impact analysis, a component of business continuity planning
- Business improvement area, a defined area within which businesses pay an additional tax or fee in order to fund improvements within the area
- Business–IT alignment, a dynamic state in which a business organization is able to use information technology (IT) effectively to achieve business objectives

== Places ==
- Bīā, a village in Iran
- Bia, Togo, a village
- Bia District, a former district of western Ghana
  - Bia National Park, a national park in Ghana
  - Bia (Ghana parliament constituency)
- Bia River in western Africa
- Phou Bia, the highest mountain in Laos

== People ==
- Bïa, a Brazilian-born singer
- Bia (Brazilian footballer)
- Bia (rapper)
- Maria Francisca Bia, 19th-century Dutch ballet dancer, opera singer and actress
- Bia de' Medici (1536–1542), daughter of Cosimo I de' Medici, Grand Duke of Tuscany
- Beatriz Haddad Maia (commonly known as Bia; born 1996), Brazilian tennis player
- Beatriz Vaz e Silva (commonly known as Bia; born 1985), Brazilian soccer player

== Other uses ==
- Bia (butterfly), a genus of brush-footed butterflies
- Bia (mythology), a Greek mythological figure
- Bia (plant), a genus of plants
- Bia, a synonym for a genus of beetles, Bius
- Bia (TV series), an Argentine telenovela
- Bia, a Filipino name for the Long-finned goby
- Bia, the common name for the Metroxylon salomonense palm

== See also ==
- Biar (disambiguation)
