= Principe di Savoia =

Hotel Principe di Savoia
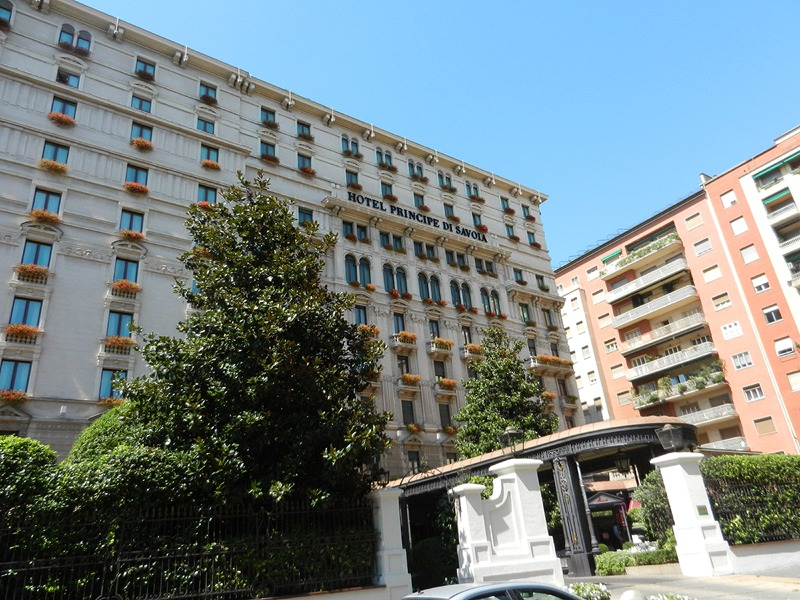

General information
- Type: Luxury hotel
- Architectural style: Neoclassical
- Location: Milan, Italy
- Named for: House of Savoy
- Opened: April 6, 1927
- Owner: Brunei Investment Agency
- Operator: Dorchester Collection

Technical details
- Floor count: 10

Other information
- Number of rooms: 301

Website
- www.dorchestercollection.com/en/milan/hotel-principe-di-savoia/

Hotel Principe di Savoia, also known as "The Principe", is a five-star luxury hotel in Milan, Italy. It was given the name "Principe e Savoia" in 1927, and soon became a home for businessmen.

In 2003, the hotel became part of the Dorchester Collection, a group of luxury hotels owned by the Brunei Investment Agency. Located on Piazza della Repubblica, The Principe houses 301 rooms with 44 suites, on ten floors.

== History ==
The hotel opened in April 1927 as the Hotel Principe e Savoia, developed by S.A. Acquisto ed Esercizio Alberghi Savoia. It has a neoclassical architectural design and was developed by Milanese architect Cesare Tenca. Following the Great Depression in the 1930s, the hotel was acquired by the Compagnia Italiana Grandi Alberghi (CIGA Hotels) in 1938, which also managed hotels including the Danieli and Gritti Palace in Venice.

During World War II, the Principe & Savoia became a headquarters for the Germans, and later served as the American headquarters. The hotel underwent renovations from 1956-1957, adding two wings: Principe Rosso and Metallico.

In the 1980s, CIGA renamed the hotel Principe di Savoia, the proper way to refer to the Italian royal family, the House of Savoy, for which the hotel is named.

In 1994, ITT Sheraton purchased a controlling interest in CIGA, and the hotel became part of the ITT Sheraton Luxury Collection. The hotel was extensively renovated, with three new floors added on top. Work was completed in 1996. Starwood Hotels and Resorts bought ITT Sheraton in 1998, and the hotel became part of The Luxury Collection division.

In 2003, The Dorchester Group, wholly owned by The Brunei Investment Agency, the investment arm of the Government of Brunei, purchased the hotel from Starwood, and it joined a group of five-star hotels that also includes such hotels as The Dorchester, Plaza Athénée, and Hôtel Meurice. The hotel is one of two hotels in Italy owned by the Dorchester Collection, the other being the Hotel Eden in Rome. The hotel was renovated at a cost of $50 million in 2009.

The hotel is scheduled to close on January 1, 2027 for renovations, and will reopen in 2029.

== Overview ==
Principe di Savoia is located in close proximity to Garibaldi, Centrale, and Cadorna stations, as well as the La Scala theatre. The hotel is appointed with a combination of classic Italian and Art Deco furnishings, complemented by various statues and décor throughout the premises. The entrance features an ornate stained-glass domed ceiling, while mosaics and chandeliers are present in both common areas and guest rooms.

Many individuals, including Queen Elizabeth II, Prince Philip, Duke of Edinburgh, Woody Allen, President George H. W. Bush, Bill Gates, and President Vladimir Putin, have stayed here.

The Principe has two restaurants and the Principe Bar (renovated in 2009 by architect Thierry Despont). There is also Salotto, which is a casual lobby lounge, and Acanto, the hotel’s fine-dining restaurant headed by executive chef Fabrizio Cadei.

== Notable guests ==
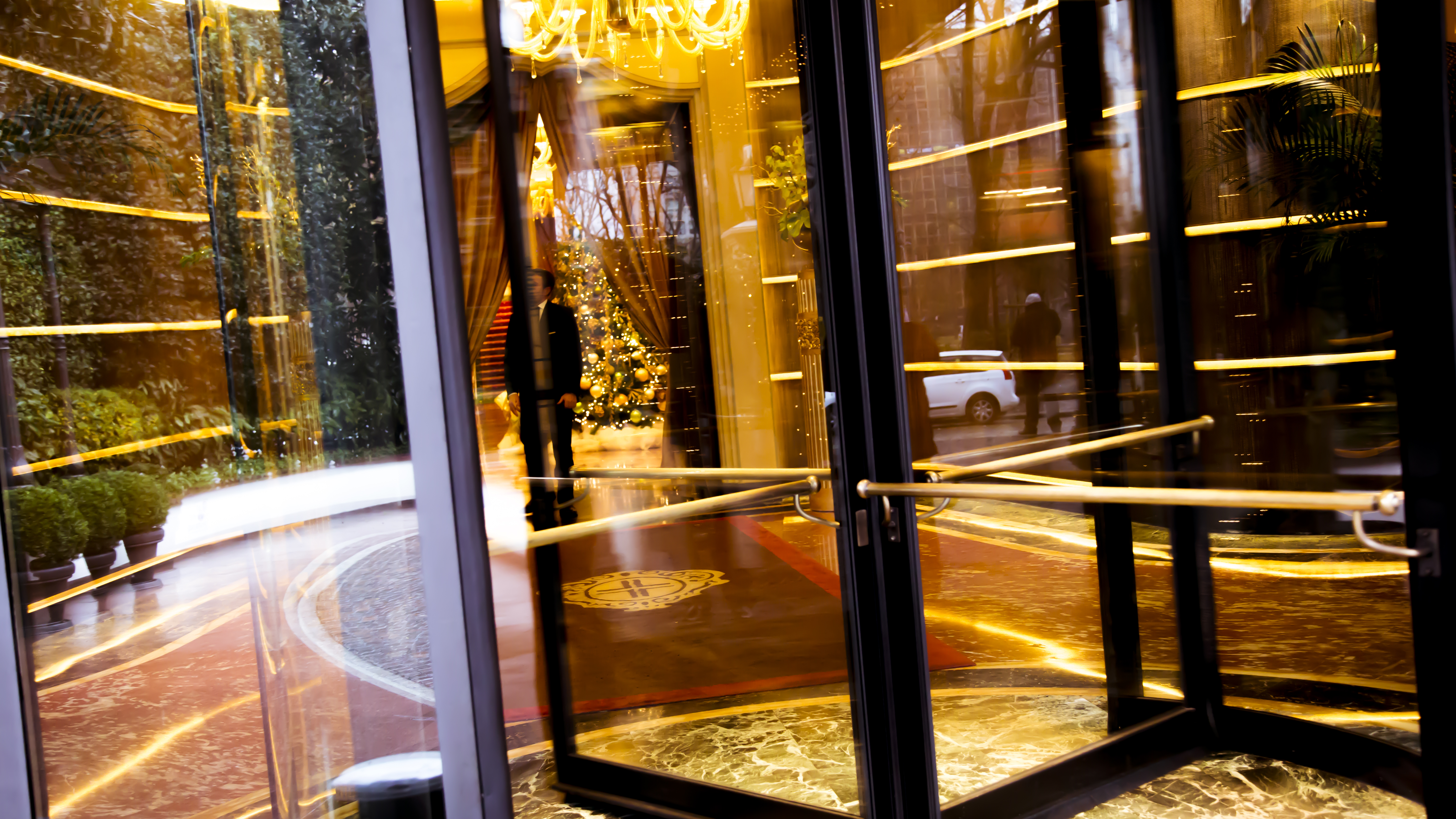
Entrance to the lobby

Since its opening, Principe di Savoia hosted notable guests and celebrities such as Edward VIII, Erich Maria Remarque, Aristotle Onassis, Evita Peron, Maria Callas, Charlie Chaplin, Josephine Baker, The Aga Khan, David Rockefeller, Elizabeth Taylor, Henry Ford and the Prince of Monaco.

Other notable guests of the hotel have included Madonna, George Clooney and David and Victoria Beckham.

== Other projects ==
- "Wikimedia".
