= Beer (disambiguation) =

Beer is an alcoholic drink.

Beer may also refer to:

== Places ==
- Beer, Devon, England, a coastal village
- Beer, Somerset, England, a hamlet
- Beer, Khyber Pakhtunkhwa, Pakistan, a union council
- Beer, Togdheer, Somaliland, a village
- Beer (lunar crater)
- Beer (Martian crater)
- List of minor biblical places: Beer

== Arts and entertainment ==
- "Beer" (The Apprentice), a 2013 television episode
- "Beer" (Blackadder), an episode of the British sitcom Blackadder II
- Beer (film), a 1985 film starring Loretta Swit and Rip Torn
- "Beer" (song), a song by Reel Big Fish
- "Beer!", a 2003 song by Psychostick from the album We Couldn't Think of a Title
- "Beer", a 2006 song by The Itchyworms from Noontime Show
- "Beer", a 2023 song by Hardy from The Mockingbird & the Crow
- Beer, a 1999 novel by Chris Walter

== Other uses ==
- Beer (surname)
- Beer (magazine), a publication from the Campaign for Real Ale
- BEER (Boot Engineering Extension Record), a special data structure at the end of hard disks pointing to "hidden" partitions, see host protected area

== See also ==
- Bear (disambiguation)
- Beare (disambiguation)
- Beers (disambiguation)
- Bere (disambiguation)
- Biar (disambiguation)
- Bier (disambiguation)
- Birr (disambiguation)
