= Biar (disambiguation) =

Biar is a town in southern Spain.

Biar or BIAR may also refer to:

- Biar, Iran, a village in western Iran
- Biar-e Kord, a village in northeastern Iran
- Akureyri Airport (ICAO code: BIAR), an airport in Iceland

== See also ==
- El Biar, a suburb of Algiers, Algeria
- Biars-sur-Cère, a commune in southwestern France
- Bier (disambiguation)
- Bere (disambiguation)
- Beer (disambiguation)
- Bia (disambiguation)
