= Fred Ball (producer) =

Norwegian record producer

- Born: Fredrik William Ball; Fredrikstad, Norway
- Occupations: Record producer; songwriter
- Website: rocnation.com/music/fred-ball

Fredrik William Ball is a Norwegian record producer, songwriter and record executive living in London. He is originally from Fredrikstad in Norway.

His production and writing credits include songs performed by Rihanna, Beyonce, Jay-Z, Eminem, Alicia Keys, Mariah Carey, Zara Larsson, Jessie Reyez, Raye, Jessie Ware, Sienna Spiro, Toni Braxton, Bernhoft, J Balvin and more. He's been nominated five times for a Grammy (Best R&B Album 2015, Best Urban Contemporary Album 2017, Best R&B Album 2019, Best Urban Contemporary Album 2019, Best Urban Contemporary Album 2020)

Fred moved to the UK when he formed his solo project 'Pleasure'; the album was hailed as The Sunday Times' favourite debut of the year. It featured artists such as Justine Frischmann, Ed Harcourt and Dr. Fink. Pleasure launched the start of Ball¹s songwriting and production career.

Ball co-wrote and produced the single "Love on the Brain" for Rihanna's album Anti. "Love on the Brain" peaked at number 5 on the Billboard Hot 100. Billboard called it "The Most Influential Pop Single of 2017." It's been certified 10 x platinum in the US. In 2017 Billboard listed Ball as number 8 in the "Hot 100 Top 10 Producers".

In June 2018, Ball contributed as a producer on three songs ("713", "Friends" and "Heard about us") for Jay-Z and Beyoncé's collaborative studio album "Everything Is Love".

Ball produced "Nice Guy feat. Jessie Reyez" on Eminem's album Kamikaze, surprise released 31 August 2018. He also produced "One Mo' Gen" on Mariah Carey's critically acclaimed album "Caution".

Ball is published by Reservoir Music Publishing and managed by Roc Nation.

== Production/writing discography ==
Jessie Reyez

- Ur Heartbeat

Dermot Kennedy

- Happiness

Giulia Be

- Girls Just Wanna

Leigh-Anne

- Me Minus U

Mulaa Joans

- Liverpool Street

Bia

- October

Lous & The Yakuza

- To Me (Smurf Soundtrack)

Cuco

- Ridin'
- Dreamin'

Lous & The Yakuza

- No Big Deal

Jessie Reyez

- I Never Said I Was Sane

Sienna Spiro

- Origami

Aurora

- The Devil is Human

Poppy

- Crossroads

Gwen Stefani

- Somebody Else's

Suki Waterhouse

- Blackout Drunk
- Cliffhanger

Jess Glynn

- We Has Something

Umi

- Why Don't We Go
- Hummingbird feat. Teezo Touchdown

J Balvin feat. Usher, Dj Khaled

- Dientes

Madison Beer

- Nothing Matters But You
- I Wonder

Zak Abel

- Winging It
- Cry
- Let Me Sing
- Midnight Gospel

Kito x Grimes

- Cold Touch

Shenseea

- Curious

Kamal

- Falling
- White Wine

Ruel

- Lie

Louis Tomlinson

- The Greatest
- Lucky Again
- All This Time
- Common People
- Holding On To Heartache

Debbie

- Cherry Wine

Dodgr

- You

Emeli Sande

- There Isn't Much

Nemahsis

- I'm Not Gonna Kill You

Alicia Keys

- Dead End Road (Originals)
- Dead End Road (Unlocked)

Harloe

- Overthinking (Feat.Nile Rodgers)

Ray BLK

- Over You (Feat.Stefflon Don)

Olivia Dean

- Fall Again

Anne-Marie

- X2
- Breathing

Zara Larsson

- Last Summer

Sam Dew

- Thinking of You

Harry Hudson

- Closing Doors feat. Astrid S

Astrid S

- Marilyn Monroe

Jessie Reyez

- Do You Love Her

Harloe

- Rivers Run Dry
- One More Chance
- Cut Me Loose
- We're All Gonna Lose
- Crush On You

Mura Masa

- Vicarious Living Anthem

Adam Lambert

- Ready To Run
- Roses feat. Nile Rodgers

Au/Ra

- Stay Happy

Maeta

- babygirl

Raye

- Love Me Again

JC Stewart

- Have You Had Enough Wine?

Kevin Garrett

- Don't Rush

Roses Gabor

- Turkish Delight

Mariah Carey

- One Mo 'Gen

They.

- Wilt Chamberlain (feat. Jeremih)

Eminem

- Nice Guy feat. Jessie Reyez

Jessie Reyez

- Apple Juice

Beyonce & Jay-Z (The Carters)

- 713
- Friends
- Heard About Us

Anne Marie

- Some People

Prince Charlez

- Back Around

Justine Skye

- Heaven

Madison Beer

- Say It To My Face

Frank Walker (ft. Emely Warren)

- Piano

Nina Nesbitt

- Take Me To Heaven

Rihanna

- Love On The Brain

Toni Braxton

- Deadwood
- Sorry

Zara Larsson

- One Mississippi

Jessie Ware

- Slow Me Down

Petite Meller

- America

Astrid S

- Does She Know

All Saints

- Summer Rain
- Puppet On A String

Betsy

- Time

Toby Randall

- Misfits

Samuel Larsen

- You Should Know

Leo Stannard

- In My Blood

Pleasure

- Don't Look The Other Way
- From The Country To The City
- All I Want- Stories- Memory
- Sensitivity
- You Got To Love Someone
- Disco Doctor
- The Visionary

Pleasure II

- Alright All Nite
- Out Of Love
- Throw it All Away
- Back to You
- UpTown
- Bite The Beat
- Silk Dream
- Eskimo Kiss
- Finest Thing
- NYCSC
- Nightvision

Little Boots

- Click
- Ghost

Bernhoft

- Choices
- Control
- C'mon Talk
- Space In My Heart
- Buzz Aldrin
- Wind You Up
- Freedom- One Way Track
- I Believe In All The Things You Don't
- We Have A Dream

Cerys Matthews

- Caught In The Middle

KT Tunstall

- Universe & U

Little Mix

- Going Nowhere
- Boy
- See Me Now
- They Just Don't Know You

Daley

- Smoking Gun

Sophie Ellis Bextor

- Synchronised

JLS

- Last Song
- Innocence
- Shy Of The Cool

Pixie Lott

- Catching Snowflakes

Samsaya

- Stereotype
- Bombay Calling
- Beginning at The End
- Love Maze
- Breaking Bad
- Superhero
- My Mind

Kylie Minogue

- Uncut Stone

Brett Anderson

- Love is Dead
- To The Winter
- Scorpio Rising
- Colour Of The Night
- Song For My Father
- The More We Possess the less we own Ourselves
- Chinese Whispers
- Back To You

Bertine Zetlitz

- Ah Ah
- Fake Your Beauty
- Want You
- If YouBuy The Blue One
- Kiss me Harder
- Candy
- Rollerskating
- Broken

Emmanuelle Seigner

- Les Mots Simples

== Awards and honors ==
- Sunday Times – Album of the Year
- Grammy Nomination 2015: Best R&B Album for Bernhoft's Islander
- Grammy Nomination 2017: Best Urban Contemporary Album for Rihanna's "Anti"
- Grammy Nomination 2019: Best R&B Album for Toni Braxton's "Sex & Cigarettes"
- Grammy Win 2019: Best Urban Contemporary Album for The Carter's "Everything Is Love"
- Grammy Nomination 2020: Best Urban Contemporary Album for Jessie Reyez' "Being Human In Public"
- BMI R&B/Hip Hop Award 2017
- BMI London Award 2017
- BMI POP Awards LOS ANGELES 2018
