= Hotel Eden =

Coordinates: 41°54′24″N 12°29′11″E

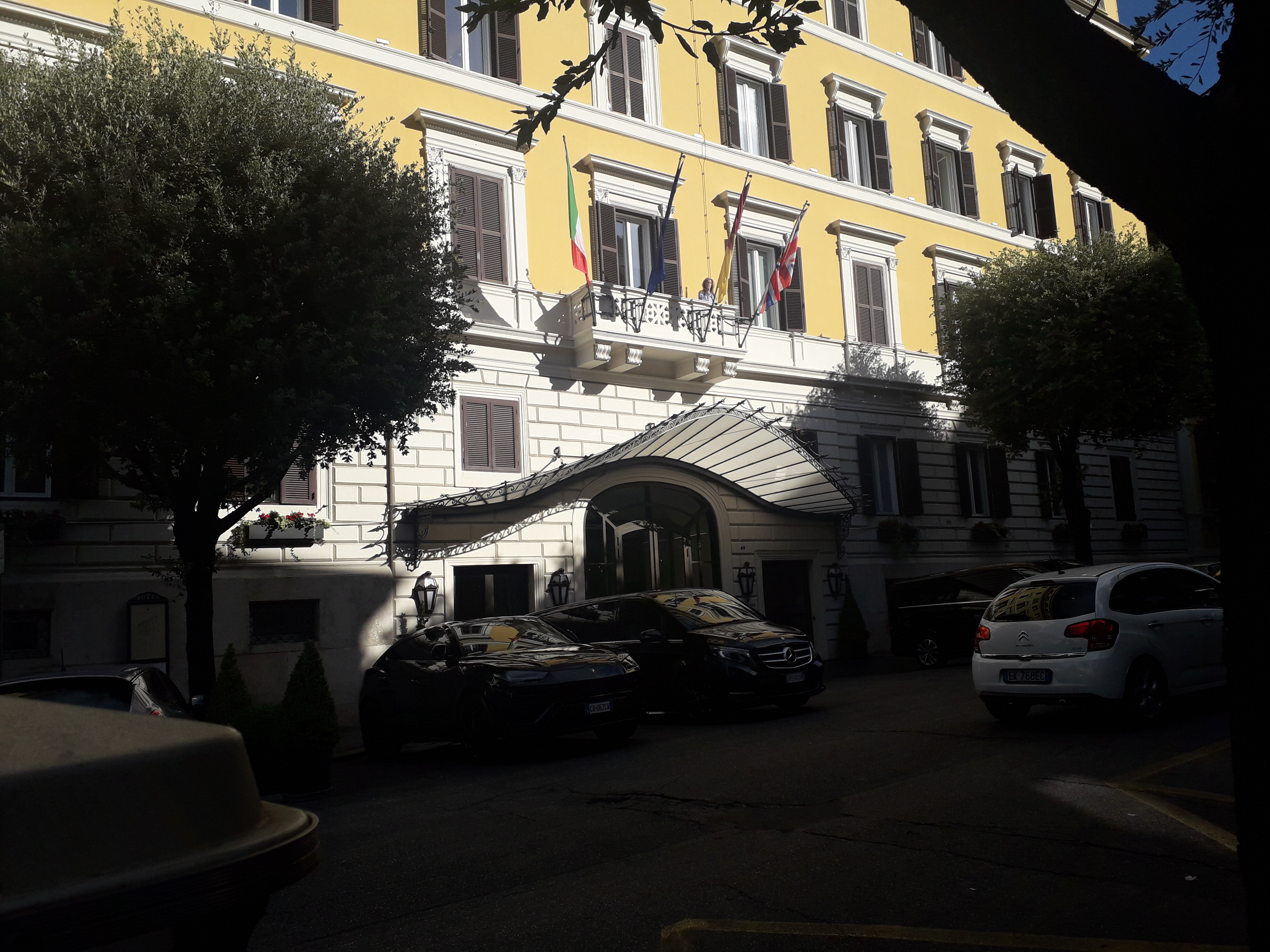
- Interactive map of the Hotel Eden area

General information
- Type: Luxury hotel
- Architectural style: Neoclassical
- Location: Rome, Italy
- Opened: 1889
- Owner: Brunei Investment Agency
- Management: Dorchester Collection

Technical details
- Floor count: 6

Other information
- Number of rooms: 98

Website
- www.dorchestercollection.com/rome/hotel-eden

Hotel Eden is a five-star luxury hotel located in Rome, Italy.

== History ==
The Hotel Eden was built in 1887 and opened as a hotel in 1889. The building, which was designed by Francesco Settimi, was originally intended to be an apartment building. Francesco Nistelweck later purchased the building and converted it to a hotel. The hotel was immediately popular with travelers from the United Kingdom and was viewed as an "English hotel". Hotel Eden was the first hotel in Rome to provide elevators and electricity. In recent history, the hotel became part of the Dorchester Collection and is one of two hotels in Italy that is owned by the company, the other being the Principe di Savoia in Milan.

== Overview ==
The Hotel Eden features 98 deluxe guest rooms in the six story building. The hotel also features three meeting rooms. It is located on Via Ludovisi and nearby attractions include Via Veneto, the Spanish Steps and Villa Borghese. The nearest Rome Metro station is the Repubblica station which is served by Line A.

== Gallery ==
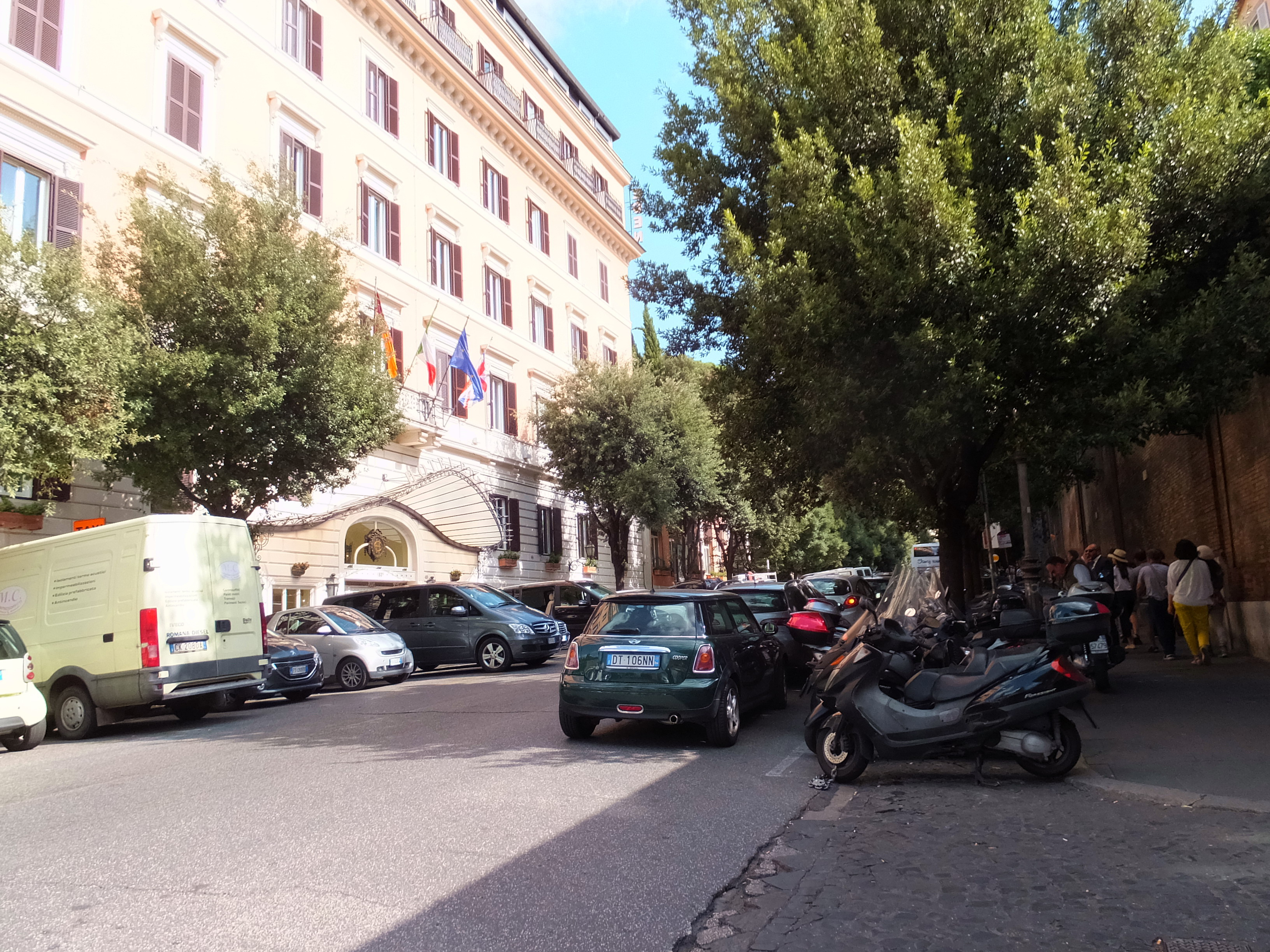
Main entrance on Via Ludovisi

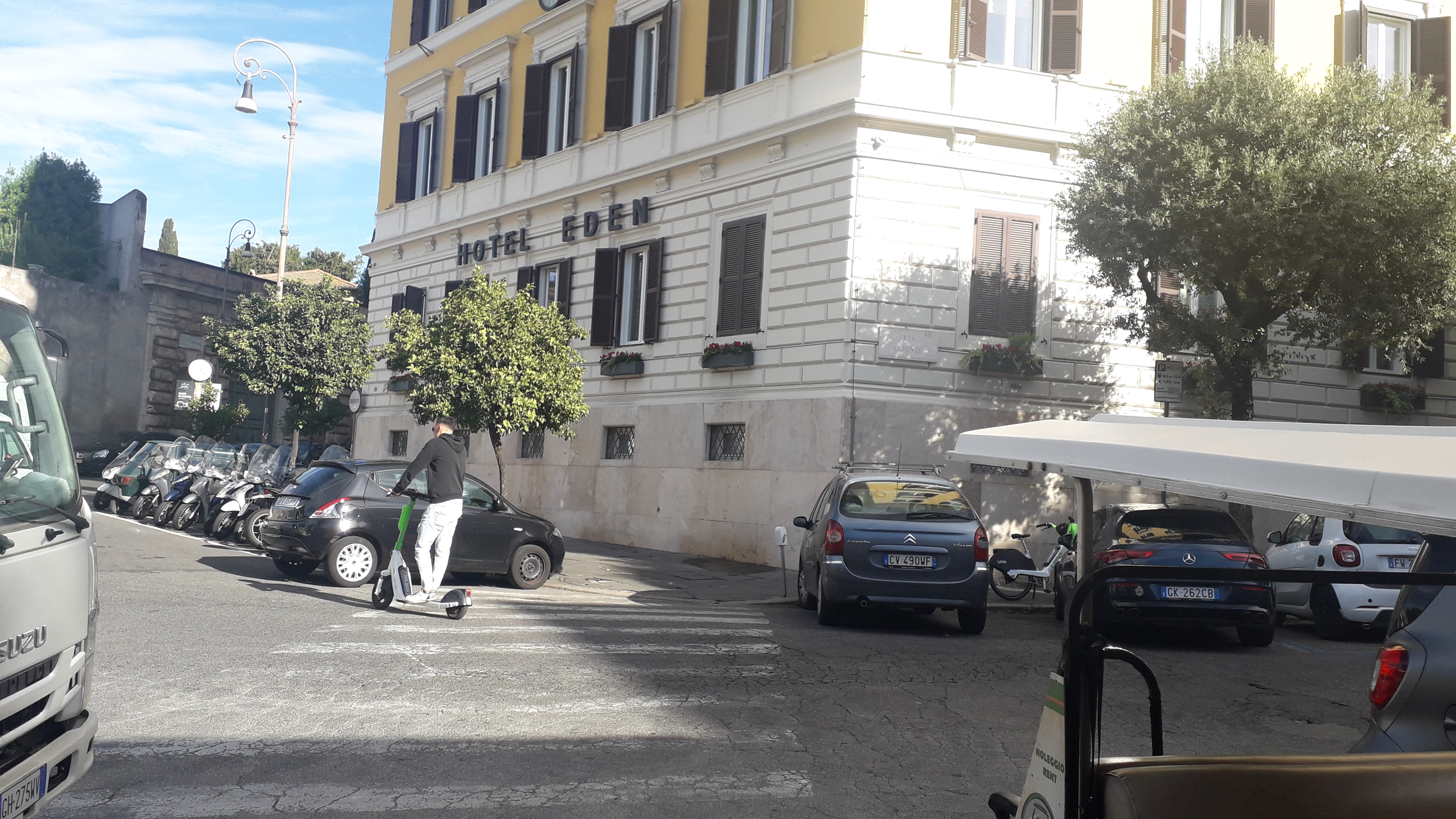
Front of hotel

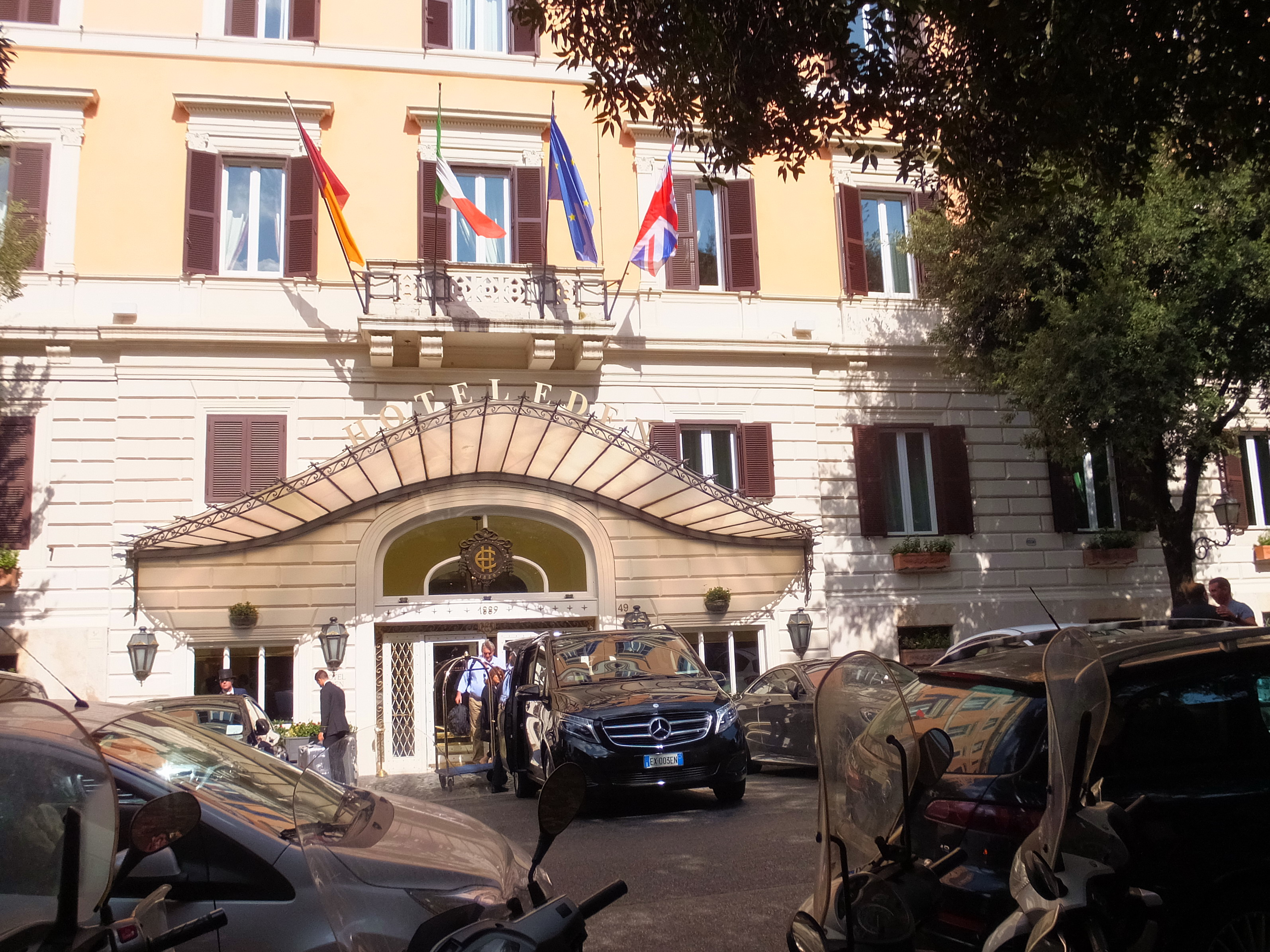
Main entrance
