= Marshall–White syndrome =

- Specialty: Dermatology

Marshall–White syndrome is a skin condition that consists of Bier spots associated with insomnia and tachycardia.

== See also ==
- Skin lesion
