= Bier (surname) =

Bier is a German surname, meaning "beer". Notable people with the surname include:

- August Bier (1861–1949), German surgeon and pioneer of anesthesiology
- Jasmina Bier (born 1997), German pararower
- Martin Bier (1854–1934), German chess player
- Steven Bier Jr. (born 1964), former stage name Madonna Wayne Gacy, former keyboard player for Marilyn Manson
- Susanne Bier (born 1960), Danish film director
- Vicki Bier, American systems engineer and decision analyst
