= Beers =

Beers may refer to:

- plural of beer, an alcoholic beverage
- Beers (surname)
- Beers, Friesland, a Dutch place in the Friesland municipality of Littenseradiel
- Beers, North Brabant, a Dutch place in the North Brabant municipality of Cuijk
- De Beers, a Johannesburg-based diamond mining and trading corporation
- Beers criteria, Beers Criteria for Potentially Inappropriate Medication Use in Older Adults
- Samuel Beers House, historic residence in Knox County, Ohio, US

== See also ==
- Beer (disambiguation)
