= Hôtel Meurice de Calais =

Hotel in Calais, France

- Location within France

General information
- Type: Palatial hotel
- Location: Calais, Nord-Pas-de-Calais, France
- Coordinates: 50°57′26″N 1°51′4″E
- Opened: 1771

Hôtel Meurice de Calais is a hotel in Calais, France. It was established in 1771 and was one of the earliest hotels on the continent of Europe to specifically cater for the British elite. It has 41 en-suite rooms.

== History ==
In the mid-18th century, the French postmaster, Charles-Augustin Meurice (born 1738), understood that English tourists wanted to be on the continent with the comforts and conveniences they were used to at home. In 1771, Meurice opened the hotel as a coach inn named the Le Chariot Royal on Rue Edmond Roche in Calais. In 1815, he opened the Hôtel Meurice in Paris, originally located at 223 Rue Saint Honore. Le Meurice offered everything to make life easier for the traveler; apartments of various sizes, areas set aside where travelers could sit and talk, specialty laundry soap, English-speaking staff, and currency exchange, among other amenities. The hotel was rebuilt in 1954–55.
