= Beare (disambiguation) =

Beare may refer to:

== Places ==
- Beare, village in Devon, England
- Beare Green, village in Surrey, England
- Beare Sound, Nunavut, Canada
- Beara Peninsula, County Cork, Ireland

== Other uses ==
- Beare (surname)
- Beare-head engine
- J & A Beare, violin dealers
