= Le Richemond =

Hotel in Geneva, Switzerland

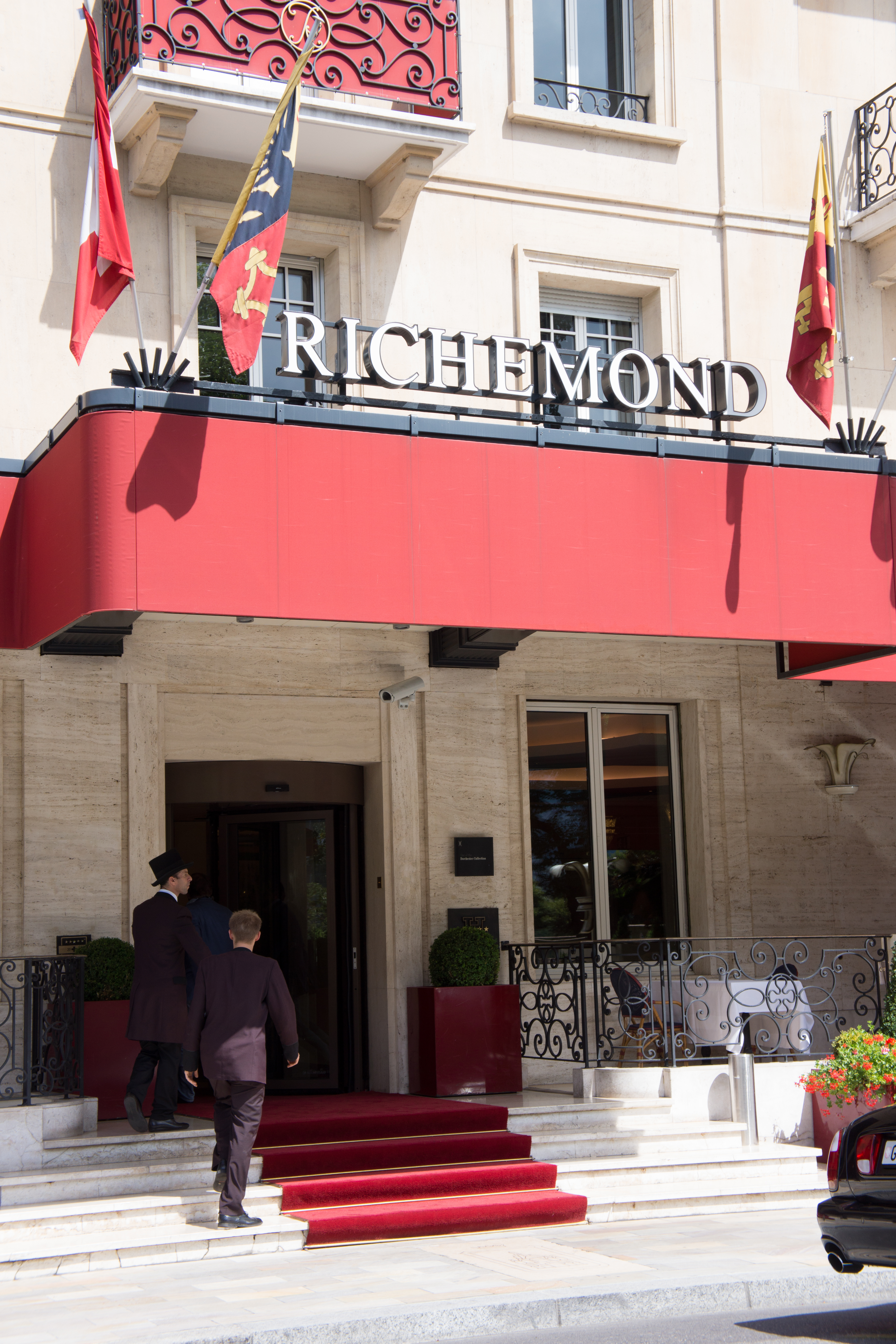
- Hôtel Richemond
- Interactive map of the Le Richemond area

General information
- Type: Hotel
- Architectural style: Art deco, Eclectic
- Location: Geneva, Switzerland
- Coordinates: 46°12′32″N 6°08′58″E
- Opening: 1875
- Owner: Independent

Technical details
- Floor count: 7

Other information
- Number of rooms: 87 guest rooms
- Number of suites: 22 suites
- Number of restaurants: 1
- Number of bars: 1

Website
- Official site

Le Richemond is a 109-room luxury hotel located in Geneva, Switzerland. The hotel was established in 1875 by Adolphe-Rodolphe Armleder and after World War II, his grandson, Jean Armleder, transformed the hotel to what it is known for today.

The 140-year-old hotel is located in Geneva's business district with views of the Alps and sets on the banks of Lake Geneva. The Royal Armleder Suite of the hotel was ranked number nine in Wealth Bulletin's survey of most expensive suites worldwide. The suite measures 230 square meters with two terraces and views across the Alps, Jura Mountains, Lake Geneva and the Old Town. The property includes a meeting center, Le Jardin restaurant, Le Bar cocktail bar, Le spa, and fitness center. Famous guests who frequented the hotel include Aga Khan, Clark Gable, Luciano Pavarotti, Krishna Menon and Colette, who wrote her last novel at the Richemond and has a suite named in her honor.

It was a part of the Rocco Forte Hotels Collection from 2004 until 2011. In August 2011, Le Richemond became the eighth hotel acquired by the Dorchester Collection.

The hotel closed in July 2020 as a consequence of the coronavirus pandemic.

In February 2023, it was announced Le Richemond had been acquired by the Jumeirah Group.

== History ==
Adolphe-Rodolphe Armleder, the son of a German maker of oak wine barrels, first opened Riche-mont in 1875 as a guesthouse with 25 rooms. The building belonged to Swiss artist François Diday who rented the building. Armleder took a hands-on approach when renovating the structure to maintain cost efficiency all while building a client list. The building was transformed from a modest structure to a well known hotel throughout Switzerland. The hotel was passed from father to son for four generations.

Financial difficulties prompted the Armleder family to sell the declining hotel in the 1990s. The Rocco Forte Collection acquired the hotel in 2005 and closed the hotel for renovations until 2007. The renovation project expanded the hotel to 109 rooms with 26 suites, the addition of a seventh floor for the Armleder suite, an Art Deco and eclectic design, and the addition of restaurants, Sapori and Le Cottage Bar and restaurant as well as Le Bar, cocktail bar. Meeting rooms, a ballroom, an on site day spa treatment facility and a fitness center were also added.

Le Richemond joined the Dorchester Collection in 2011. Renovations to bring the unique design elements of Dorchester hotels were implemented in the restaurants and bar areas as well as hotel suites.

In March 2015, Le Richemond Hotel was host to the University of Essex's Human Rights Centre's 50th anniversary. The former President of Slovenia, Dr. Danilo Türk, gave the keynote.

== Restaurants ==
- Le Jardin
- Le Bar
