= Plaza Athénée =

Luxury hotel in Paris

Hotel Plaza Athénée
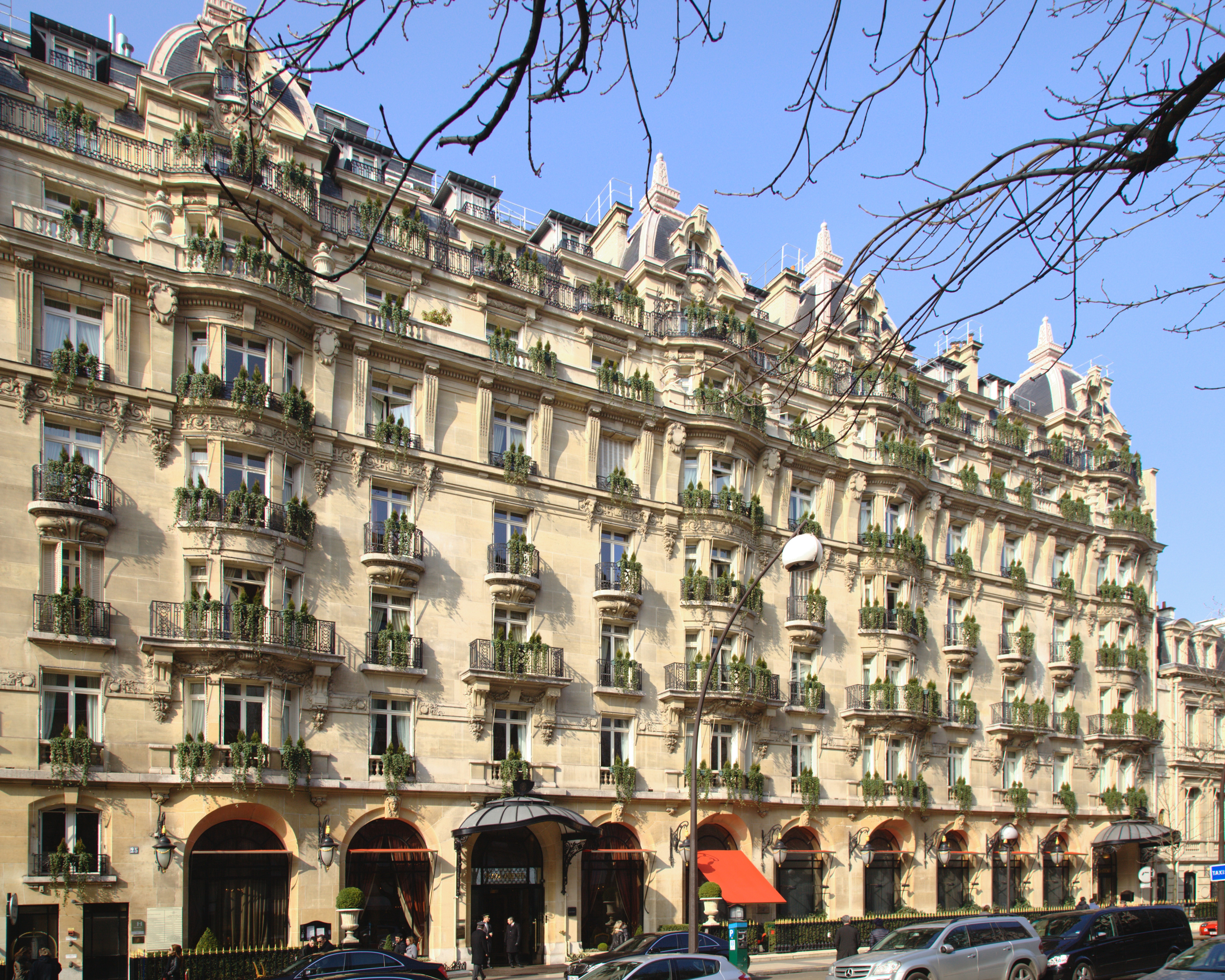
- Hotel Plaza Athénée
- Interactive map of the Hotel Plaza Athénée area

General information
- Type: "Palace" grade hotel
- Location: Paris, France, 25 Avenue Montaigne 48°51′59″N 2°18′15″E
- Opened: April 20, 1913; 112 years ago
- Owner: Brunei Investment Agency
- Management: Dorchester Collection

Other information
- Number of rooms: 154
- Number of suites: 54

Website
- Official website

The Hotel Plaza Athénée (French pronunciation: [plaza atene]) is a Brunei-owned historic luxury hotel in Paris, France. It is located at 25 Avenue Montaigne in the 8th arrondissement of Paris, near the Champs-Élysées and the Palais de Tokyo. The hotel is part of the Dorchester Collection group of international luxury hotels. The hotel has five restaurants and a bar, and it has room rates ranging from US$1,254 to US$20,000 per night for the hotel's premier suite.

== History ==
=== Early history ===
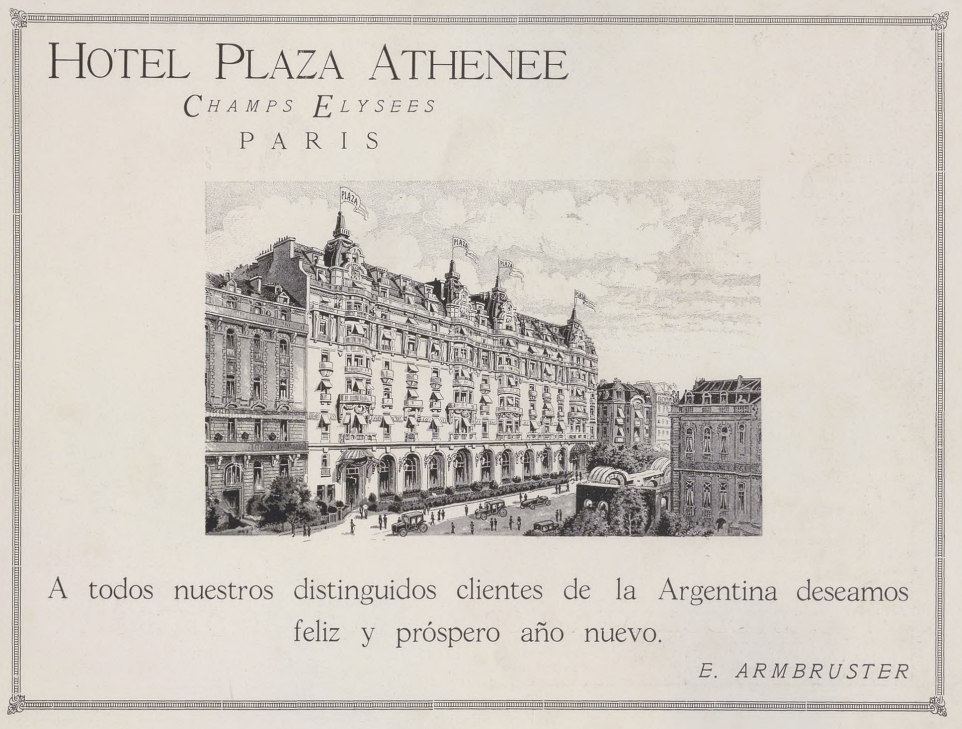
Advertisement for the Plaza Athénée Hotel in the Argentine magazin Plus Ultra, January of 1923.

The Hotel Plaza Athénée opened on Avenue Montaigne on 20 April 1913. The hotel's first manager Emile Armbruster named it. Composers and artists regularly dined at Plaza Athénée after performances. At the time, Jacques-Léon Colombier, winner of the London Gourmet Prize, was the head chef of the hotel's restaurant. The Hotel Plaza Athénée remained open during World War I.

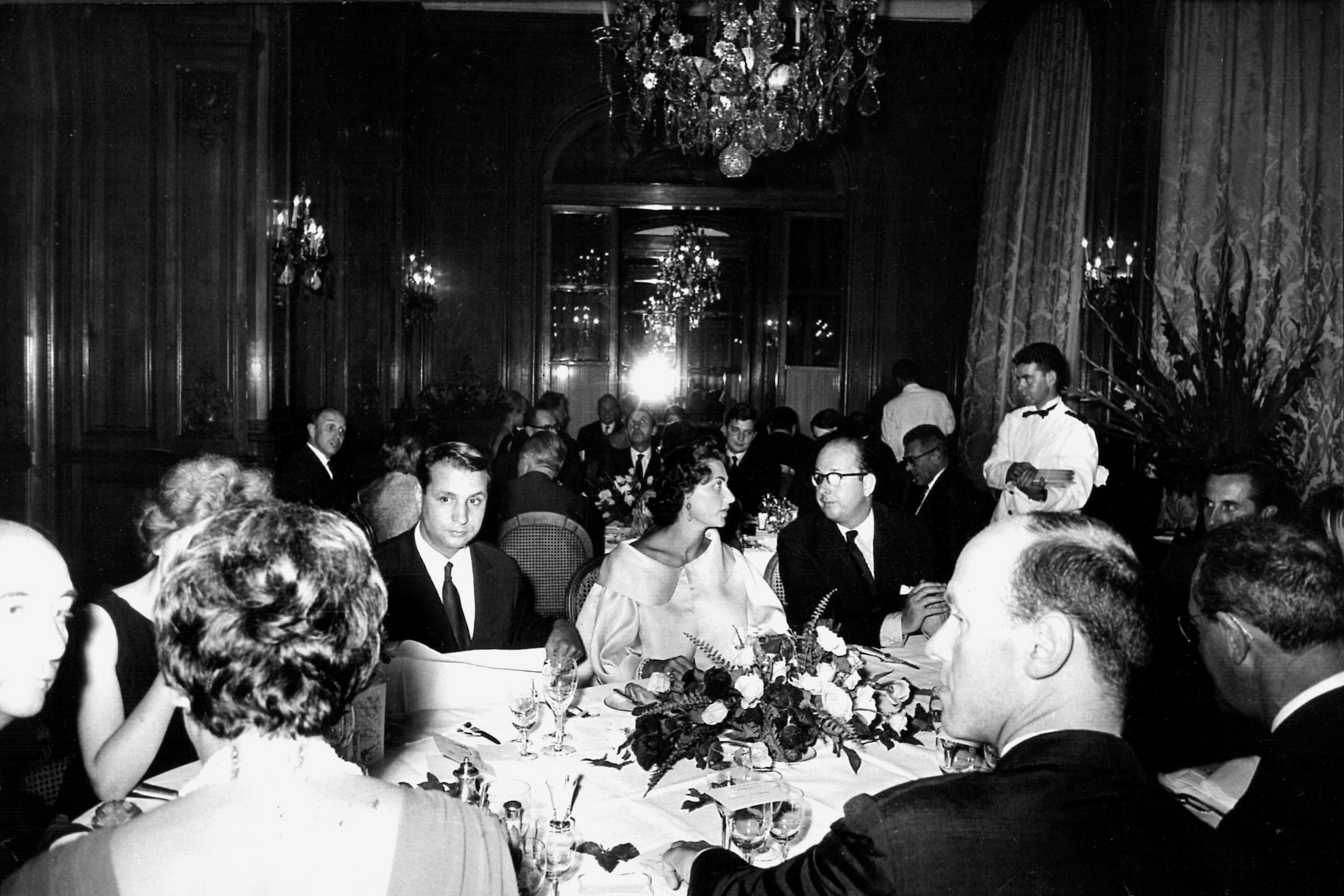
Plaza Athénée Hotel, 1962

In the 1920s, Jules Lefebvre expanded the hotel's size with the addition of apartment hotels, the restaurant La Cour Jardin and two salons. The Le Relais restaurant became a cafeteria for American soldiers during the Liberation of Paris. In 1947, Christian Dior established his couture house next to the hotel. Georges Marin became the new hotel director in 1963. In 1968, the Forte Group purchased the Hotel Plaza Athénée.

=== Recent history ===
From 1998 to 2000, the hotel was renovated under the management of François Delahaye. He chose Alain Ducasse to supervise the hotel's catering services and create a menu for the hotel's new restaurant Alain Ducasse. Ducasse obtained three Michelin stars at his Plaza Athénée restaurant in 2001. Additionally, Delahaye appointed pastry chef Christophe Michalak at La Galerie des Gobelins and Philippe Marc as chef of Le Relais Plaza.

In 2001, the Dorchester Collection acquired the Hotel Plaza Athénée on behalf of the Brunei Investment Agency. The Brunei Investment Agency purchased the hotel buildings in 2003. That year, Laurence Bloch was appointed hotel manager. Bloch commissioned the interior decorators Bettina Mortemard and Marie-José Pommereau to update 194 rooms and suites.

In 2008, the Dior Institute was opened at the hotel as a spa. In 2012, the Hotel Plaza Athénée was awarded the "Palace" distinction, the highest achievement for luxury hotels in France.

In August 2014, it re-opened after a 200 million euro expansion and renovation. The renovation integrated additional buildings, created six new guest rooms, eight suites, a ballroom and two event spaces.

== Overview ==
The majority of the hotel is classically French, except for the seventh and eighth floor that are done in Art Deco. The Hotel Plaza Athénée flies red canvas awning over every window and displays window boxes with geraniums.

There are several restaurants in the building. In 2000, Alain Ducasse chose the Athénée for his haute cuisine restaurant. It serves dinner on weeknights and lunch on Thursdays and Fridays. Other eateries include the Relais Plaza (classical French cuisine), La Cour Jardin (Riviera-style cooking), La Galerie des Gobelins (breakfast, light lunch, tea and pastries) and Le Bar du Plaza, a popular night spot. Famous chefs to have worked there before Ducasse include Jacques Pépin.

Other amenities include a sauna and steam room. In 2008, the Dior Institute was opened at the hotel and is run by Dior staff.

== In popular culture ==
The hotel was featured in the final season of HBO's Sex and the City, as well as Something's Gotta Give, The Smurfs 2 and Emily in Paris. It was also the setting for the British-French film Le Week-End.

Elizabeth Taylor and Richard Burton spent six months at the hotel in 1971. This was later referenced by Taylor Swift on the song "Elizabeth Taylor" from her twelfth album The Life of a Showgirl (2025).
