= Biar, Iran =

Biar بيار
- Village
- Location within Iran
- Coordinates: 34°49′01″N 46°56′41″E
- Country: Iran
- Province: Kurdistan
- County: Kamyaran
- Bakhsh: Central
- Rural District: Bilavar

Population (2006)
  - Total: 266
- Time zone: UTC+3:30 (IRST)
  - Summer (DST): UTC+4:30 (IRDT)

Biar (Persian: بيار, also Romanized as Bīār) is a village in Bilavar Rural District, in the Central District of Kamyaran County, Kurdistan Province, Iran. At the 2006 census, its population was 266, in 67 families. The village is populated by Kurds.
