= Beare =

Village in Devon, England

Coordinates: 50.801°N 03.437°W

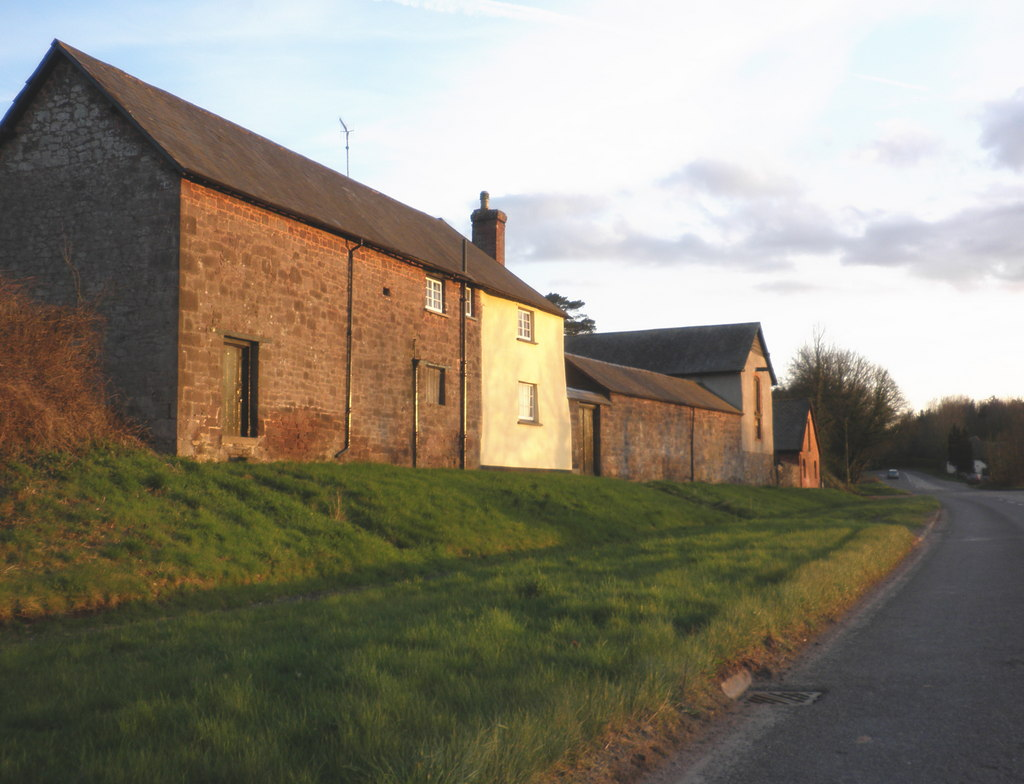
- Beare Farm

- Location within Devon
- OS grid reference: SS9800
- Shire county: Devon
- Region: South West
- Country: England
- Sovereign state: United Kingdom
- Police: Devon and Cornwall
- Fire: Devon and Somerset
- Ambulance: South Western

Beare /ˈbɪər/ is a village in the civil parish of Broadclyst in Devon, England.
