= Coworth Park Hotel =

Country house hotel in Berkshire, England

Coordinates: 51°24′16″N 0°37′01″W

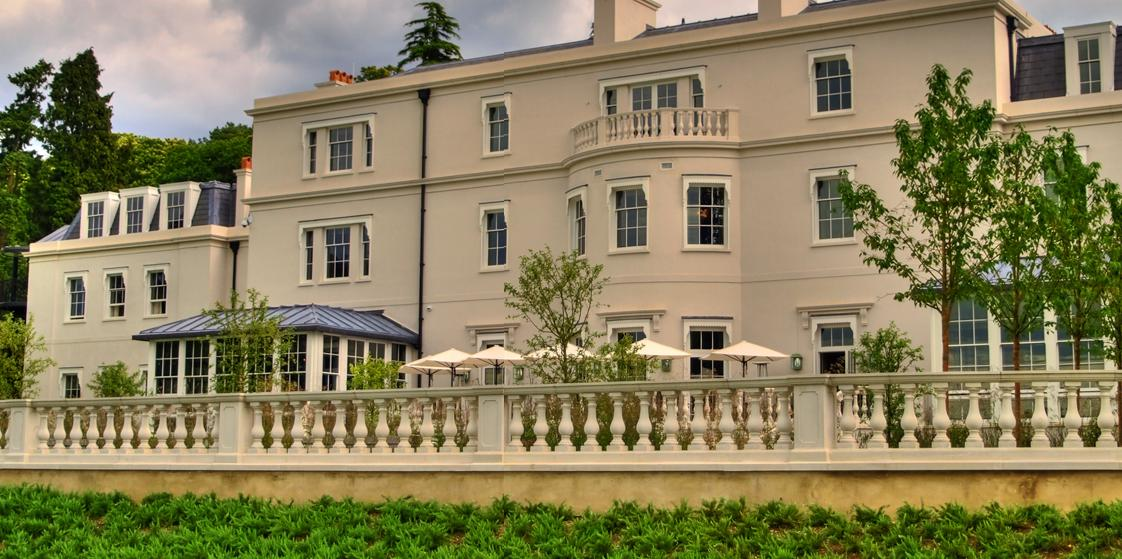
- Interactive map of the Coworth Park Hotel area
- Alternative names: Coworth House

General information
- Architectural style: Georgian architecture
- Location: Sunningdale, near Ascot, Windsor and Maidenhead, UK
- Named for: Hamlet of Coworth
- Construction started: 1776
- Owner: Brunei Investment Agency
- Operator: Dorchester Collection

Other information
- Number of rooms: 70
- Number of restaurants: 3

Website
- Official site

Coworth House, currently known as Coworth Park Hotel, is a late 18th-century country house situated at Sunningdale, near Ascot, in the English county of Berkshire. It is one of the ten hotels operated by the Dorchester Collection, a group of luxury hotels in Europe and the United States owned by the Brunei Investment Agency.

In 2008, its interiors were rebuilt to facilitate the house's new use as a hotel. Coworth Park opened as a luxury resort in September 2010. It also includes an eco-spa and is the only hotel in the United Kingdom that has its own polo grounds.

== History ==
Coworth House dates in its oldest form from 1776. It takes its name from the surrounding hamlet of Coworth, which until a reorganisation in 1894, lay in the parish and manor of Old Windsor.

The land that Coworth Park now stands on was granted in 1066 by the saintly Edward the Confessor to Westminster Abbey. William the Conqueror regained possession of it from the Abbey in exchange for lands in Essex. Theoretically, the manor of Old Windsor still remains with the Crown. In 1606 it was leased by James I to Richard Powney, whose great-grandson, Penyston Powney, was administering it in 1737. After his death in 1757, his son and heir, Penyston Porlock Powney, became the Crown lessee, and was still appearing as such in records when Coworth House was constructed in 1776. The land was conveyed in 1770 by William Hatch and Elizabeth his wife, who were presumably Powney's agents or sub-tenants, to one William Shepheard. No records survive to confirm as much, but in all likelihood it was William Shepheard who six years later constructed the dwelling seen today.

Shepheard was a prosperous East India merchant with offices in London. He was the first of two men associated with British India to own the property. When Shepheard died about 1810, Coworth House passed to his son, also called William, whose executors sold it before 1836 to George Arbuthnot (1772–1843), a Scottish colonel who served in Madras. The 1841 census finds Arbuthnot sharing the house, perhaps as two distinct entities perhaps not, with the family of his nephew and son-in-law, John Alves Arbuthnot (1802–1875), a director of the London Assurance Company and of the London and Colonial Bank. John Alves Arbuthnot was a son of Sir William Arbuthnot, 1st Baronet. He married his cousin, Mary (1812–1859), with whom he had eleven children. He was the founding partner of the firm of Messrs, Arbuthnot Latham & Co. and was high sheriff of Berkshire in 1873. He inherited Coworth House from his uncle and died there 20 August 1875 aged seventy-three, leaving a personal estate 's worn under £400,000. He gave Coworth House – then called Coworth Park – to his daughters, "for as long as more than two shall remain unmarried", then to his eldest son, William Arbuthnot (1833–1896) who at the time of his father's death was living on the estate with his family at Park Lodge.

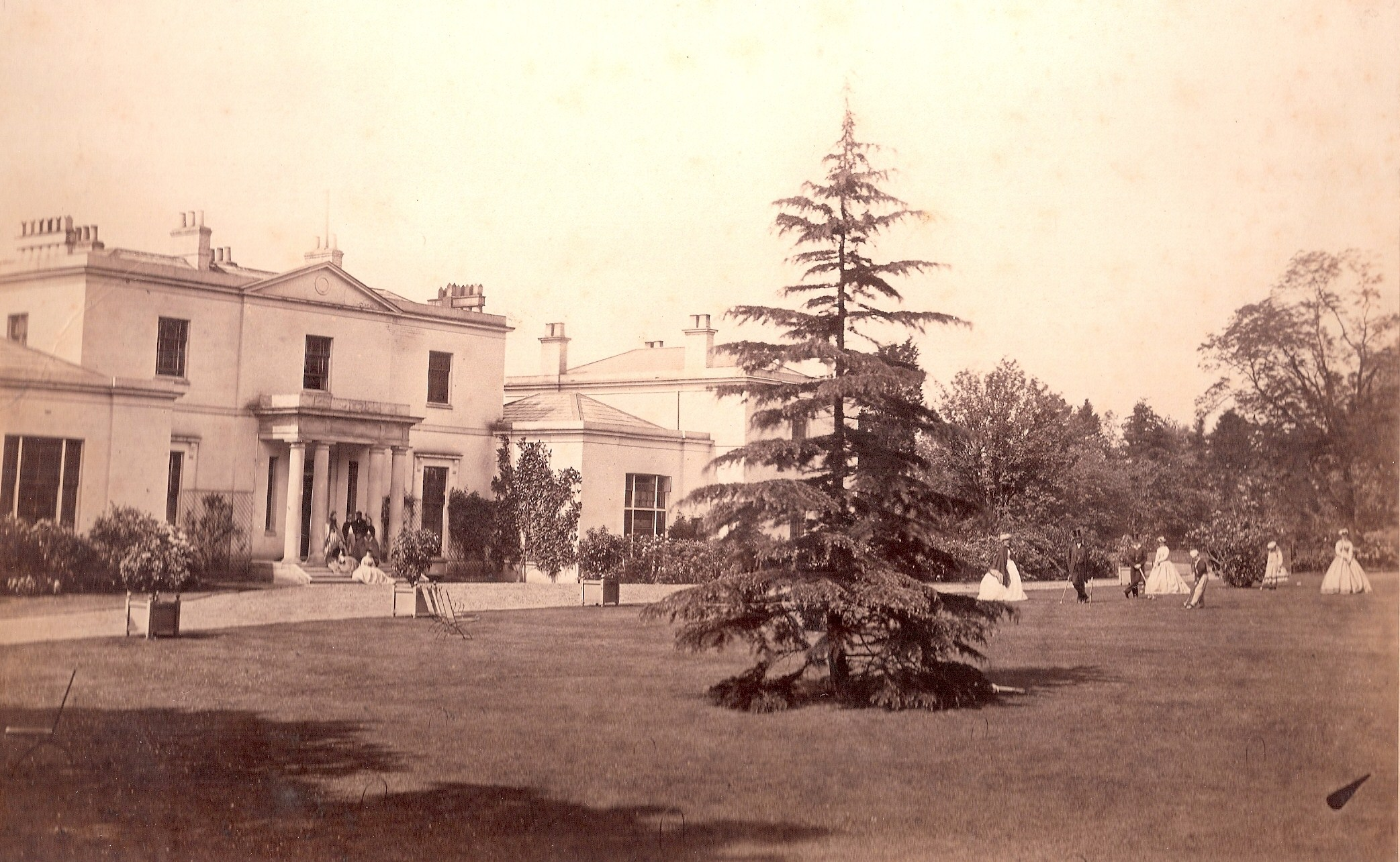
Coworth House, c. 1862

William Arbuthnot spent his formative years in India where in 1858 he married Adolphine, the second daughter of Edward Lecot, the French Consul at Madras. Adolphine died in the year of her marriage. Seven years later, William married (Margaret) Rosa, the eldest daughter of John Campbell of Kilberry, Argyll, with whom he had three daughters, Mary, Alice and Rosa, but no son.

In 1883, William Arbuthnot sold Coworth House to William [afterwards Sir William] Farmer (1832–1908), chairman of Messrs. Farmer & Co. Ltd., Australia merchants, of No 48 Aldermanbury in the City of London. Farmer, who was Sheriff of London 1890–1891, and high sheriff of Berkshire in 1895, was Master of the Gardeners' Company in 1898. About 1899 he sold Coworth House to Edward George Villers Stanley (1865–1948), Lord Stanley, who in 1908 succeeded his father as 17th Earl of Derby.

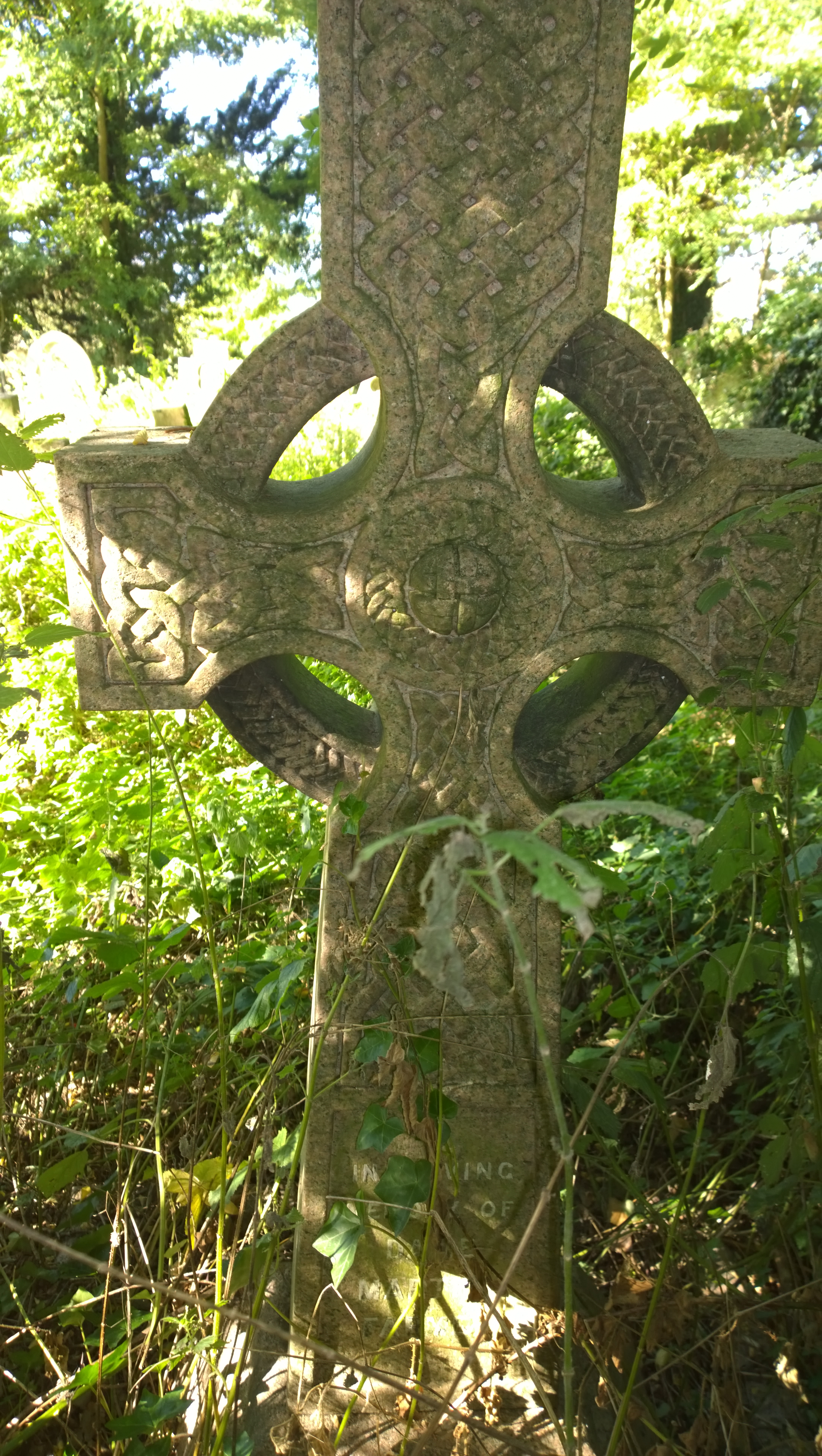
Grave of Sir William Farmer, Sheriff of London 1890 (1832–1908) and his wife Martha née Perkins (1901) St Marys Church, Winkfield, Berkshire

Coworth House continued with Lord Derby until his death in 1948. It then became the home of his widow, Alice Stanley, Countess of Derby, the youngest daughter of the 7th Duke of Manchester, and a lady-in-waiting to her friend, Alexandra of Denmark. Lady Derby died there 24 July 1957, aged ninety-four. A month later her former home was advertised for sale in The Times; and at this or a subsequent date was converted to use as a Roman Catholic convent school. The entrepreneur Harold Bamberg converted the house to multi-occupation use as offices. Bamberg was a director of the travel agency Sir Henry Simpson Lunn Limited (later to become Lunn Poly travel, then part of Thomson Holidays) and chairman of British Eagle Airways. During the 1970s James and Veronica Welch trained thoroughbred racehorses from the rented Victorian stables.

In the mid-1980s, Coworth Park was acquired by Galen Weston, owner of Selfridges and Fortnum & Mason, who developed the property's first polo field. Coworth Park was purchased by the Dorchester Collection, owned by the Brunei Investment Agency (BIA), in 2001. Dorchester closed the establishment in 2008 for several years to refurbish the original Coworth House and surrounding buildings, and create a five-star resort. Coworth Park reopened and began operating on 25 September 2010. The official launch was held in April 2011 and was attended by Prince Abdul Azim of Brunei.

== Overview ==
Coworth Park is a luxury countryside resort. The property consists of several buildings, including the original Coworth House, built in 1776. Nearby stables and cottages were converted into rooms and suites for a total of 70 rooms. The property spans over 240 acres and includes facilities such as a spa, polo and equestrian grounds, stables for 30 horses, heated pool, and helicopter pad.

Coworth Park was built in a Georgian architectural style featuring high ceilings, grand proportions and original period windows. The hotel incorporates a contemporary design with mostly British-made sculptures and art throughout the rooms.

The hotel was also the first UK hotel of its kind to incorporate sustainable measures, such as a biomass boiler within an underground energy centre that is fueled from burning willow trees. The willow is grown on the estate and allows Coworth Park to use carbon-neutral fuel.

The spa at the hotel was built to have minimum impact on the environment and was constructed partially submerged in the ground with timber and lime-hemp walls. It also grows herbs on its green roof.

== Restaurants and bars ==
Coworth Park has 4 restaurants.
