= Vicki Bier =

American systems engineer

Vicki Marion Bier is an American systems engineer and decision analyst whose work concerns risk management, disaster preparedness, and critical infrastructure protection, including analysis of the safety of nuclear power, anti-terrorism, and preparedness for sea level rise caused by global warming. She is professor emerita of industrial and systems engineering at the University of Wisconsin–Madison, an external fellow in the Center for Risk and Economic Analysis of Terrorism Events at the University of Southern California, and editor-in-chief of the journal Decision Analysis.

== Education and career ==
Bier was born in New York City to two "risk-averse parents", and grew up in Tucson, Arizona. After undergraduate study in mathematical sciences at Stanford University, graduating in 1976, she did her doctoral studies with Alvin Drake at the Massachusetts Institute of Technology. With the help of Liz Drake, she worked as a graduate student doing risk analysis for the Arthur D. Little firm. Her 1983 dissertation was A Measure of Uncertainty Importance for Components in Fault Trees.

She worked in industry on nuclear power plant safety from 1982 until 1989, and joined the University of Wisconsin faculty in 1989.

== Recognition ==
Bier was named a Fellow of the Society for Risk Analysis in 1996; the society gave her their Outstanding Service Award in 2000 and their Distinguished Achievement Award in 2007. She has been president of the Decision Analysis Society of the Institute for Operations Research and the Management Sciences (INFORMS), was the 2016 winner of the Decision Analysis Society's Frank P. Ramsey Medal for distinguished contributions in decision analysis, and was elected as a Fellow of INFORMS in 2018.

A conference in her honor was held at Tsinghua University in China in 2017.
