= Bangkok International Airport =

Bangkok International Airport may refer to one of the following airports serving Bangkok, Thailand:

- Suvarnabhumi Airport, the city's main international airport, referred to as New Bangkok International Airport during its construction
- Don Mueang International Airport, officially known as Bangkok International Airport until 2006
