= Dorchester Collection =

Brunei luxury hotel operator

Dorchester Group
- Trade name: Dorchester Collection Ltd
- Type: Private
- Industry: Hospitality industry
- Founded: 11 June 1981; 45 years ago in London, United Kingdom
- Headquarters: London, W1; United Kingdom
- Number of locations: 10
- Key people: Christopher Cowdray, (President); Philippe Leboeuf, (CEO); François Delahaye, (COO)
- Products: Hotels; Resorts; Tourism
- Revenue: ▲£464.3 million GBP (2023)
- Total assets: ▼£1.4 billion GBP (2023)
- Total equity: ▲£879 million GBP (2014)
- Number of employees: 3080 (2025)
- Parent: Brunei Investment Agency
- Website: Dorchester Collection Website

Dorchester Collection is a luxury hotel operator headquartered in London and owned by the Brunei Investment Agency (BIA), an arm of the Ministry of Finance of Brunei.

== History ==
In 1987, the Sultan of Brunei, Hassanal Bolkiah, bought the Dorchester Hotel and the Beverly Hills Hotel and then transferred the ownership to the Brunei Investment Agency in 1991. The Audley Group, owned by the BIA, was established in 1996 to manage the hotels under one company. Later, the Audley Group became the Dorchester Group Limited. The Dorchester Group Ltd. owns the Dorchester Collection which was established in 2006 to manage several luxury hotels in Europe and the United States. The Dorchester Collection manages ten luxury hotels. The hotels are a mix of wholly owned and part-owned hotels as the Dorchester Collection acquires them and manages them on behalf of third party owners. In 2025, Philippe Leboeuf was named as CEO.

== Properties ==
=== Hotels ===
Dorchester Collection owns and manages ten five-star luxury hotels:

- The Dorchester (London)
- 45 Park Lane (London)
- Coworth Park (Sunningdale)
- Le Meurice (Paris)
- Plaza Athénée (Paris)
- Principe di Savoia (Milan)
- Hotel Eden (Rome)
- The Beverly Hills Hotel (Beverly Hills)
- Hotel Bel-Air (Los Angeles)
- The Lana (Dubai)

The company is planning a property in Tokyo, Japan, that is set to open in 2028.

=== Restaurants ===
- Alain Ducasse and China Tang at The Dorchester
- Alain Ducasse au Plaza Athénée
- Restaurant le Meurice Alain Ducasse
- La Terrazza at Hotel Eden
- Wolfgang Puck at Hotel Bel-Air
- Polo Lounge at the Beverly Hills Hotel
- Woven by Adam Smith at Coworth Park
- CUT at 45 Park Lane
- Acanto at Hotel Principe di Savoia

== Controversy ==
Sultan Hassanal Bolkiah of Brunei, via his Brunei Investment Agency (BIA) owning the Dorchester Collection hotels, raised concern abroad in April 2014 by implementing the Sharia law penal code that includes death by stoning, the severing of limbs, and flogging for what are regarded to be crimes in Brunei such as abortions, adultery, and homosexual acts. None are exempted from the Sharia Law regardless of the classes they are in and the laws only apply in Brunei's border. Brunei has a complex legal system that consists of two parts which involve separate courts and legislation for Islamic and non-Islamic citizens.

In protest, a United States national LGBT advocacy organization, the Gill Action Fund, canceled its reservation to hold a conference of major donors at the Beverly Hills Hotel and demanded a refund of its deposit. The hotel management responded by issuing a statement asserting that it does not discriminate on the basis of sexual orientation. Fashion designers Brian Atwood and Peter Som subsequently called for wider protests, urging the fashion industry to boycott all of the hotels owned by the Dorchester Collection. The Beverly Hills Hotel, long a popular spot for celebrity functions, has been rejected by much of Hollywood over the controversy. HR Magazine said that the protests are "misguided" and will not affect the government policy of Brunei when the Dorchester Collection's annual revenue is $300 million while the BIA has over $30 billion in assets from oil and gas.

Chief executive officer Christopher Cowdray asked the public to consider the issue at hand in a broader perspective, citing the fact that many brands are backed by foreign investors. The U.S. national advertising-industry newspaper Adweek declared that "the bad press and protests have tarnished the glamorous image of the Beverly Hills Hotel, one of the most famous hotels in the world" and added that "such extreme brand damage will be difficult to repair." As of May 2014, "more than $2 million worth of events have been canceled at the Beverly Hills Hotel by dozens of groups." There have also been people speaking out in opposition of the protests and boycott of the hotel. Russell Crowe and Kim Kardashian have spoken out against the boycott, despite disapproval of the new laws in Brunei, citing how it is unfair to punish the hardworking employees and workers at the hotel.

In March 2019 when the Sultan announced the coming into force of the sharia law in question on 3 April 2019 George Clooney, Elton John and Ellen DeGeneres called again for a boycott of all hotels associated with him. It resulted in the Sultan backtracking on enforcing the laws that would have made sex between men and adultery punishable by stoning to death in May 2019.
