= Hotel Bel-Air =

Hotel in Los Angeles, California, US

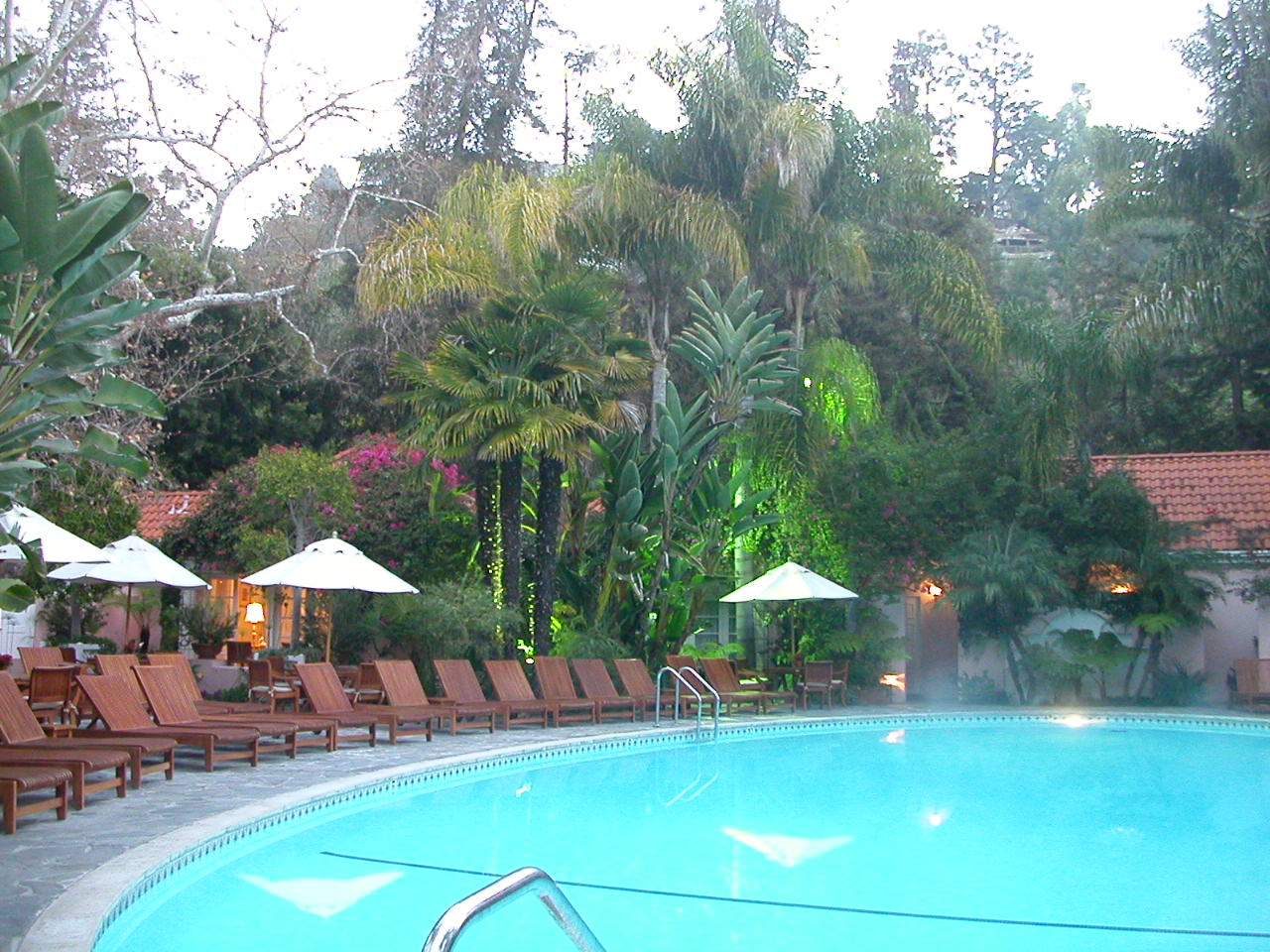
- The hotel pool.

- Location in Bel Air/Western Los Angeles Area

General information
- Location: Bel-Air, California, 701 Stone Canyon Road, Los Angeles 90077
- Coordinates: 34°5′11.09″N 118°26′46.63″W
- Opened: 1946
- Owner: Brunei Investment Agency
- Operator: Dorchester Collection

Design and construction
- Awards: Michelin key

Other information
- Number of rooms: 103
- Number of suites: 45
- Number of restaurants: 1

Website
- Official website

The Hotel Bel-Air is a boutique hotel located in Bel-Air, Los Angeles, California. The hotel is one of the nine luxury hotels operated by the Dorchester Collection, which is owned by the Brunei Investment Agency (BIA). The hotel has a total of 103 rooms, 45 of which are suites. The Bel-Air hotel has an overall old Hollywood style and is surrounded by 12 acres (4.9 ha) of gardens in the Bel-Air Estates neighborhood.

Located just outside Beverly Hills and Westwood, Hotel Bel-Air has regularly housed notable guests and celebrities including Elizabeth Taylor, Robert Wagner, Judy Garland, Bette Davis, Lauren Bacall, Paul Newman, Robert Redford, Jimmy Stewart, Audrey Hepburn and Grace Kelly, who frequented the hotel so regularly she had a suite named after her. Hotel Bel-Air was also the setting for Marilyn Monroe's last Vogue magazine shoot, six weeks before her death.

== History ==
The hotel was originally built in 1922 on 60 acres (24 ha) of gardens by Alphonzo Bell. Since opening in 1946, the facility, located on Stone Canyon Road, has served celebrities, heads of state and dignitaries. Initially built as office space and riding stables, it was purchased in 1946 and converted into a hotel by Texan entrepreneur Joseph Drown. Drown partnered with architect Burton Schutt to redevelop the property as a luxurious hotel.

The hotel was themed on an oasis, with Drown adding Swan Lake, which guests cross by foot bridge to get to the hotel. The grounds are planted in ficus, fig, palms and continuously-blooming flowers.

After Drown's death in the 1980s, the hotel was sold to the Hunt family of Texas and became part of its Rosewood Hotels & Resorts collection. The Hunt family revitalized the property by hiring famed chef Wolfgang Puck to consult on the menu and hotel restaurant. Caroline Hunt sold the hotel for $100 million in 1989 to Japan's Sazale Group.

In 1995, the hotel was purchased by Prince Jefri Bolkiah of the royal family of Brunei, then in 2008 the Dorchester Collection, owned by the Brunei Investment Agency, acquired the hotel. After a two-year closure for major renovations, the hotel reopened in October 2011.

In 2014, the hotel faced controversy relating to its ownership's relation to the Sultan of Brunei. The Sultan enacted the first phase in adopting aspects of Sharia law to the Brunei criminal code, and his hotels were boycotted in protest.

== Gallery ==
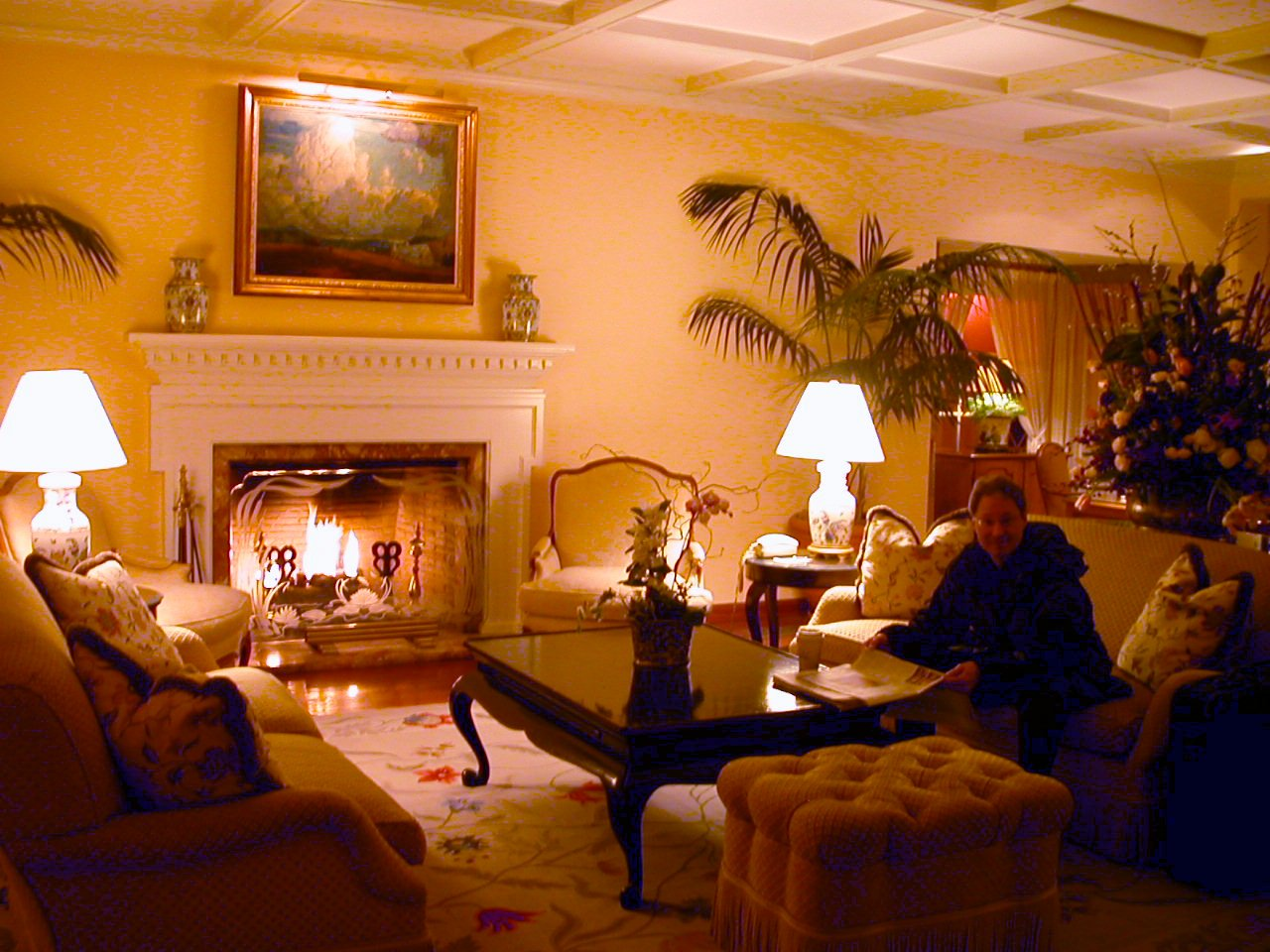
Hotel lobby

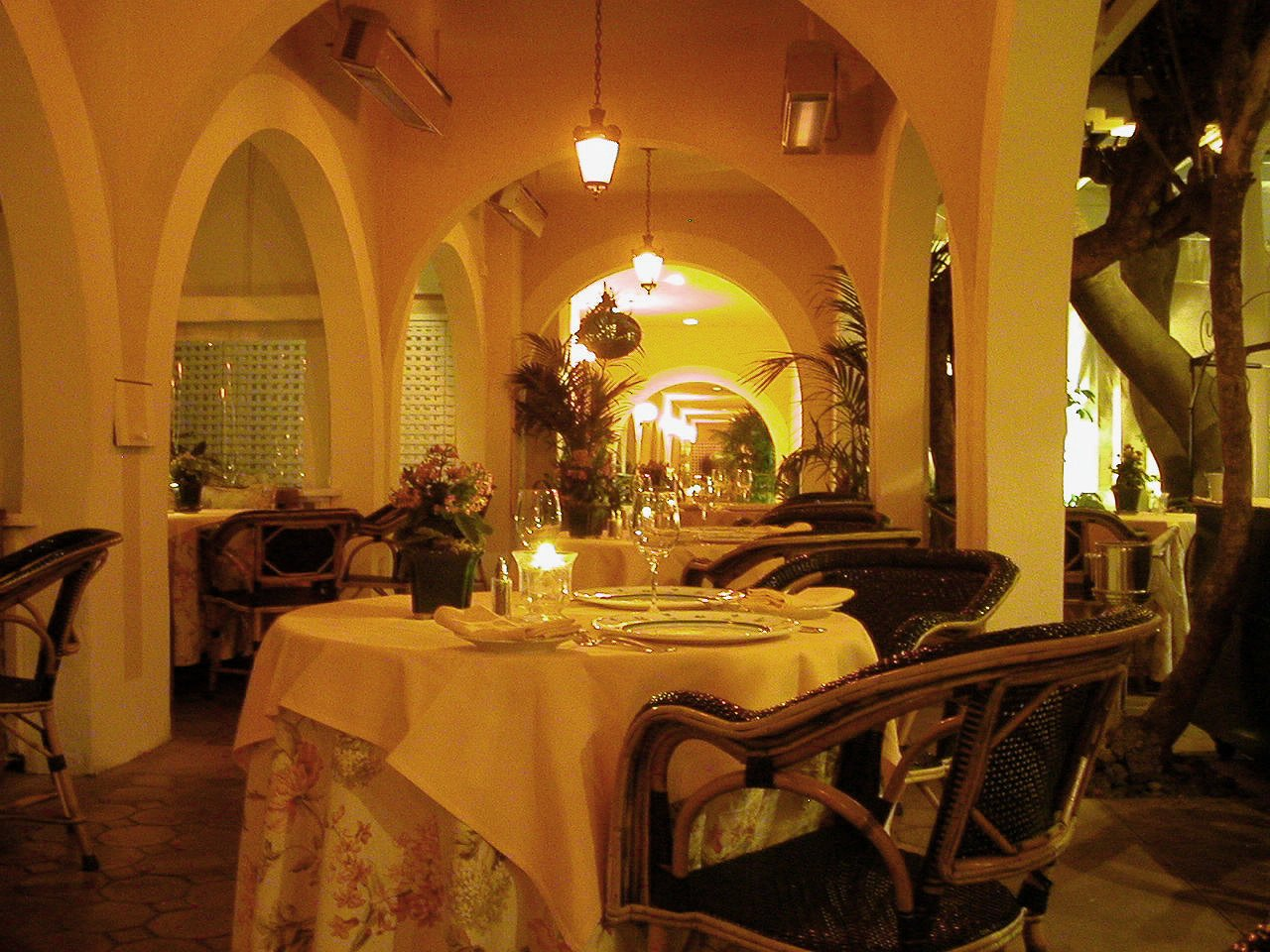
Hotel Bel Air restaurant

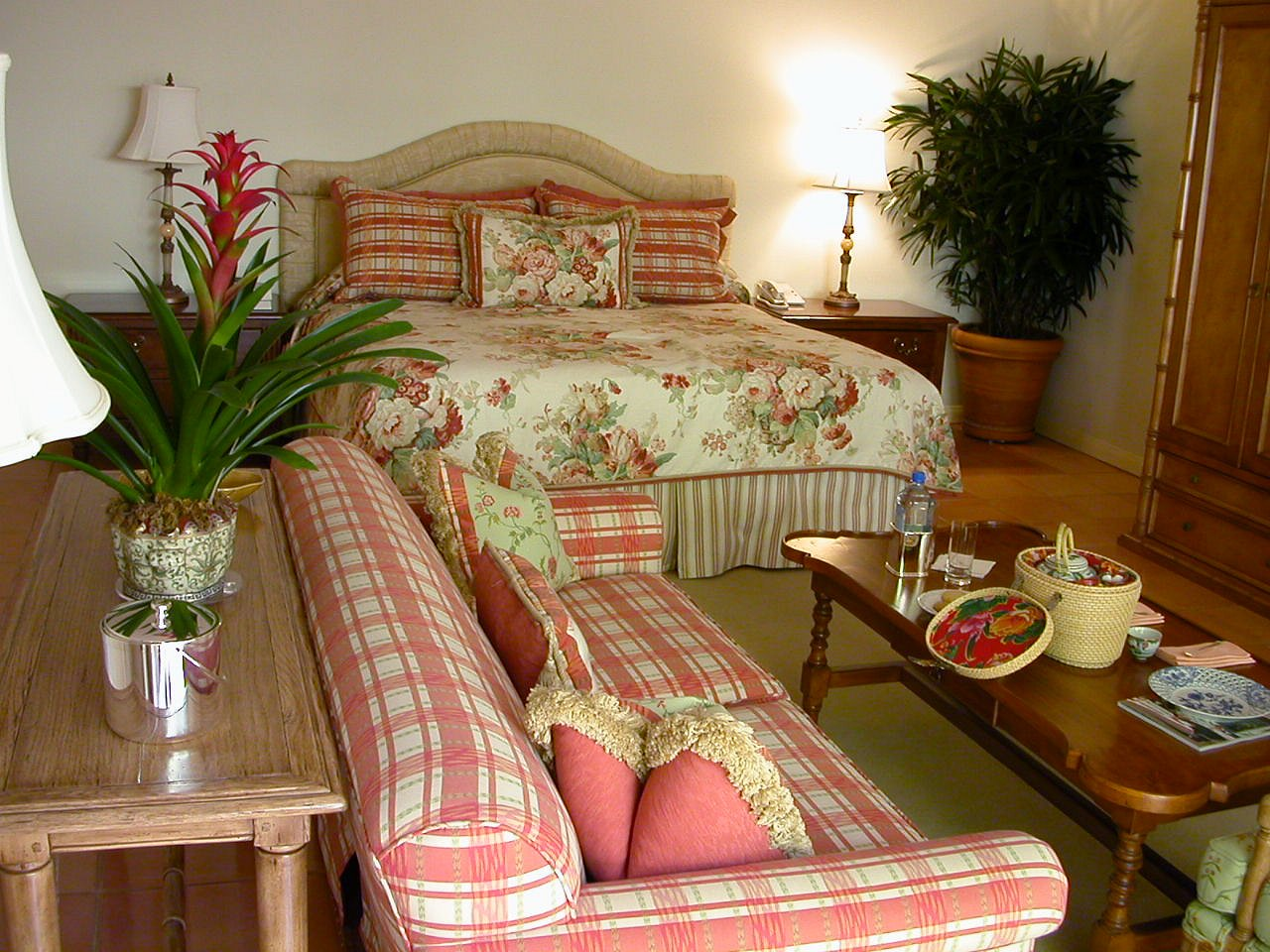
Guest room

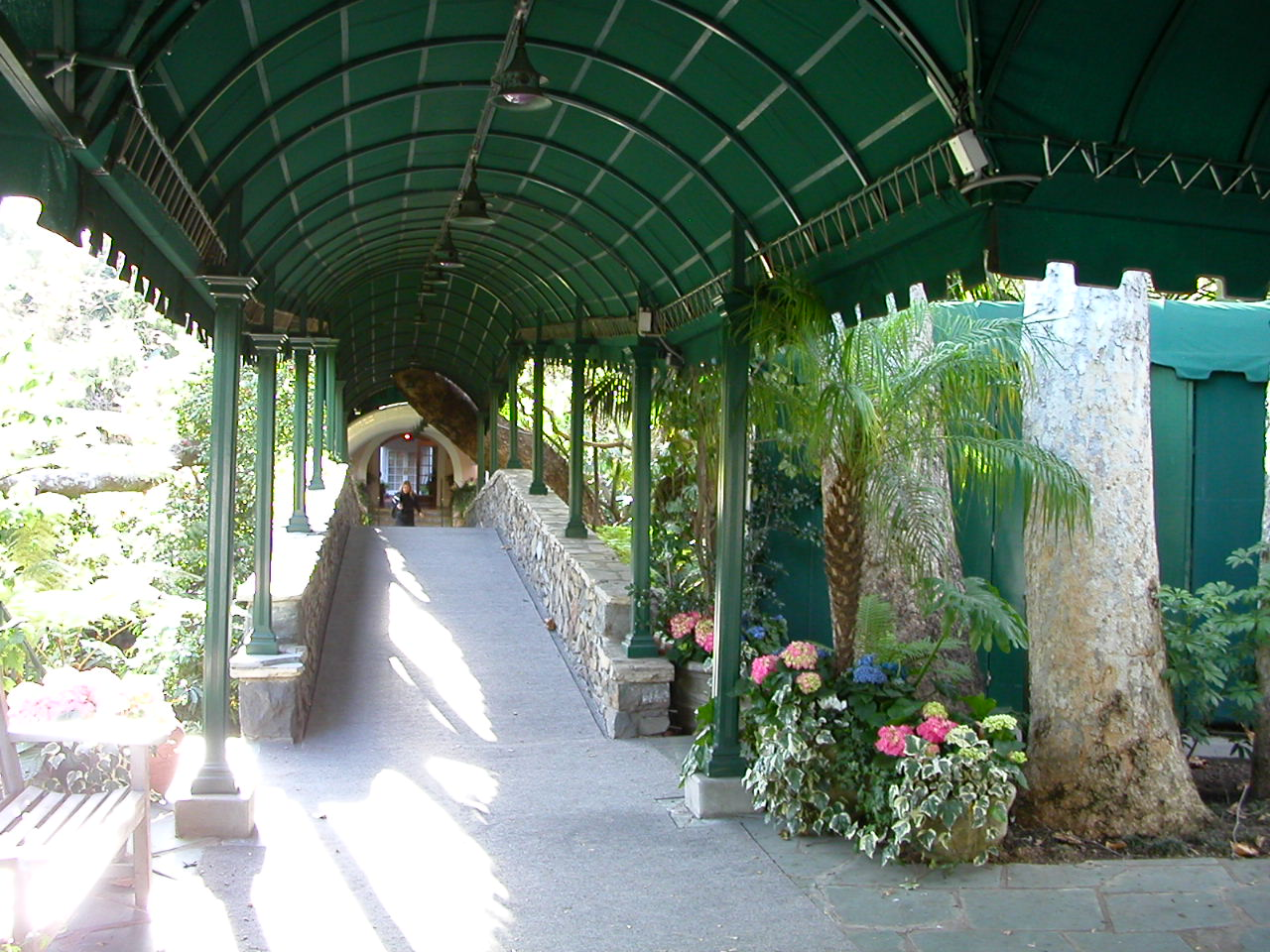
Walkway to the hotel entrance
