= Bier spots =

Light spots on the hands, arms and legs

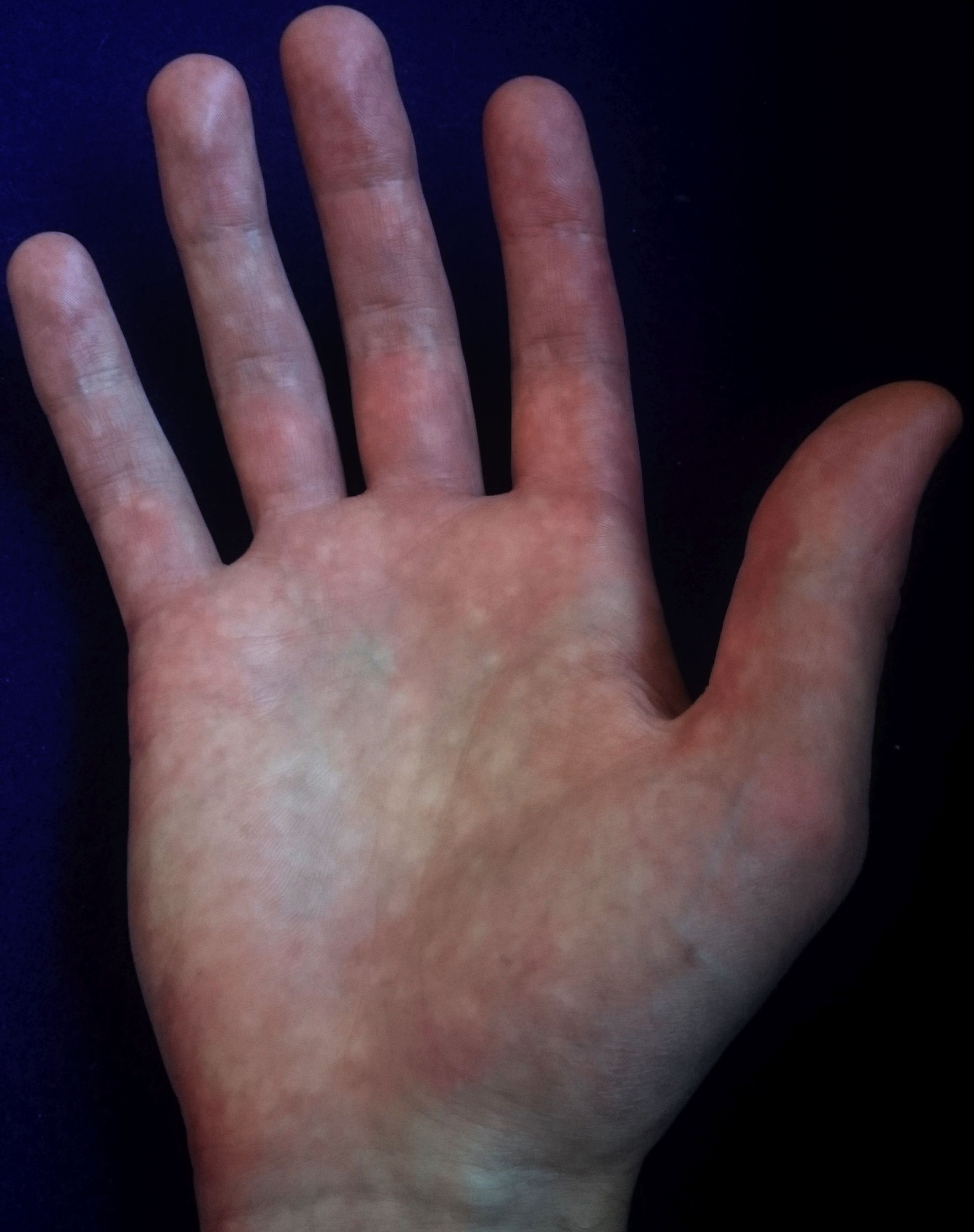
- Hand with multiple Bier spots
- Specialty: Dermatology

Bier spots are small, light macules usually found on the arms and legs of young adults, in which the intervening skin may seem erythematous but blanches with pressure so that these light macules disappear. This is a benign physiologic vascular anomaly of no significance clinically.

== Diagnosis ==
The spots appear when the blood is congested with a bandage on the upper arm, e.g. with a blood pressure cuff.

They can also appear when in hot environments, as blood vessels dilate.

The spots also appear when the arms are slightly raised from the trunk (angle approx. 45°) and disappear again when the arms are stretched upwards.

== Treatment ==
It is a physiological phenomenon that requires no treatment.

== See also ==
- Marshall–White syndrome
- List of cutaneous conditions
