= Biological indicator evaluation resistometer =

A Biological Indicator Evaluation Resistometer (BIER) vessel is a piece of equipment used to determine the time taken to reduce survival of a given organism by 90% (also known as a log 1 reduction). The name derives from how the equipment is used.

A BIER vessel evaluates the resistance of biological indicators to moist heat (steam) sterilization. For example, if a 90% reduction is determined to be 5 minutes for the microorganism being evaluated, then a D-value of 5 is assigned. D values are specific to starting bioload, substrate (the material the spores are on), and microbe species.

BIER vessels typically cost in excess of $100,000, and thus tend to be located where biological indicators are manufactured.
