= Brunei Investment Agency =

Sovereign wealth fund of Brunei

- The National Emblem of Brunei
- Native name: Agensi Pelaburan Brunei
- Type: Statutory Corporation (Sovereign wealth fund)
- Industry: Investment management, Financial services
- Founded: 1 July 1983
- Founder: HM Sultan Hassanal Bolkiah
- Headquarters: Ministry of Finance and Economy Building, Commonwealth Drive, Bandar Seri Begawan, Brunei
- Area served: Worldwide
- Key people: Hassanal Bolkiah (Chairman); Dato Seri Setia Dr. Amin Liew Abdullah (Minister of Finance and Economy II); Haji Sofian bin Haji Mohammad Jani, CFA (Managing Director); Noorsurainah (Su) Tengah, CFA (Acting Chief Investment Officer & Head of Listed and Alternative Assets); Ahmad Jefri Abd. Rahman (Assistant Managing Director); Dato Seri Paduka Haji Khairuddin bin Haji Abdul Hamid (Board Member); Hazim Rahman (Investment Officer); Farid Redawan (Senior Associate, Investments); Shauw Yusuf Liew (Investment Associate); Atiqah Zailani (Investment Analyst)
- Products: Asset Management, Private equity, Real estate
- AUM: ▲US$82 billion (2026 est.)
- Owner: Government of Brunei
- Parent: Ministry of Finance and Economy
- Subsidiaries: Dorchester Collection (100%)
- Website: www.mofe.gov.bn

Brunei Investment Agency (BIA) is the sovereign wealth fund of Brunei, established in 1983 to manage the country's external reserves and diversify its economy. It is one of the most secretive investment entities globally, reporting directly to the Ministry of Finance and Economy.

== History ==
The BIA was established on 1 July 1983, under the Brunei Investment Agency Act (Chapter 137). Its creation was a strategic move by the Government of Brunei to internalize the management of its foreign reserves, which were previously managed by the British Crown Agents. By 1985, the agency made its first major global mark by purchasing The Dorchester in London for $85 million.

Over the decades, the agency transitioned from a passive reserve manager to an active institutional investor. In 1996, it formed the Dorchester Collection to consolidate its high-end hospitality assets across Europe and North America.

== Corporate Overview ==
Brunei Investment Agency (BIA) is a government-owned investment corporation that functions as the sovereign wealth fund of the Sultanate of Brunei. Established in 1983, the agency manages the nation's General Reserve Fund and long-term external assets. It is globally recognized for its discrete but high-impact investments in luxury hospitality, global equities, and financial services firms.

== Portfolio and Key Subsidiaries ==
The agency operates through several primary subsidiaries and holding companies to manage its diverse assets:

=== Dorchester Collection ===
The BIA is the sole owner of the Dorchester Collection, a luxury hotel operator that manages some of the world's most valuable real estate, including:

- The Dorchester (London)
- The Beverly Hills Hotel (Los Angeles)
- Hôtel Plaza Athénée (Paris)
- The Lana (Dubai) – Opened in 2024 as a landmark expansion into the Middle East.

=== Financial and Strategic Equity ===
As of 2025, the BIA has transitioned from being a client of major funds to an equity owner in global financial institutions:

- Bridgewater Associates: In August 2025, BIA acquired a nearly 20% stake in the parent holding company of Bridgewater Associates, making it one of the largest institutional shareholders in the firm.
- Bank Islam Brunei Darussalam (BIBD): The BIA holds a significant controlling interest in Brunei's largest Islamic bank, ensuring domestic financial stability.

== Governance and Management ==
The agency is governed by a Board of Directors chaired by the Sultan of Brunei. Day-to-day management is led by a Managing Director, currently Haji Sofian bin Haji Mohammad Jani, and a Chief Investment Officer (CIO). The agency's operations are overseen by the Investment Division of the Ministry of Finance and Economy.

== Function ==
The agency's core mandate is the management of the General Reserve Fund. Under the BIA Act, this fund is tasked with:

- Generational Savings: Acting as a perpetual trust to provide income for future generations after the depletion of Brunei's hydrocarbon reserves.
- Economic Buffer: Protecting the national budget from the volatility of global oil and gas prices.

The fund is estimated to hold approximately US$78 billion as of early 2026, though the exact figure remains classified under Brunei's national security laws.

== Recent Investment Activity (2024–2026) ==
Since 2024, the BIA has pivoted toward direct equity ownership in global financial giants and technology infrastructure:

- Bridgewater Associates (2025): In August 2025, BIA acquired a nearly 20% stake in the parent holding company of Bridgewater Associates, the world's largest hedge fund. This converted BIA's long-standing fund investments into direct equity ownership following the exit of founder Ray Dalio.
- National AI Infrastructure (2025): Through its subsidiary partnerships (notably with EVYD Technology), BIA supported the launch of Brunei's first national AI application platform in December 2025, deploying high-performance GPU servers to support healthcare data sovereignty.
- The Pierre Hotel, New York (2025): In June 2025, reports surfaced that BIA was in advanced discussions to acquire The Pierre Hotel in Manhattan, seeking to add the historic property to its Dorchester Collection portfolio.
- Luxury Residential Expansion: In late 2025, BIA’s Dorchester Collection secured the management rights for the "1 Mayfair" project in London, a high-value residential development valued at £2 billion.
