= Will Rogers Memorial Park =

Public park in Beverly Hills, California

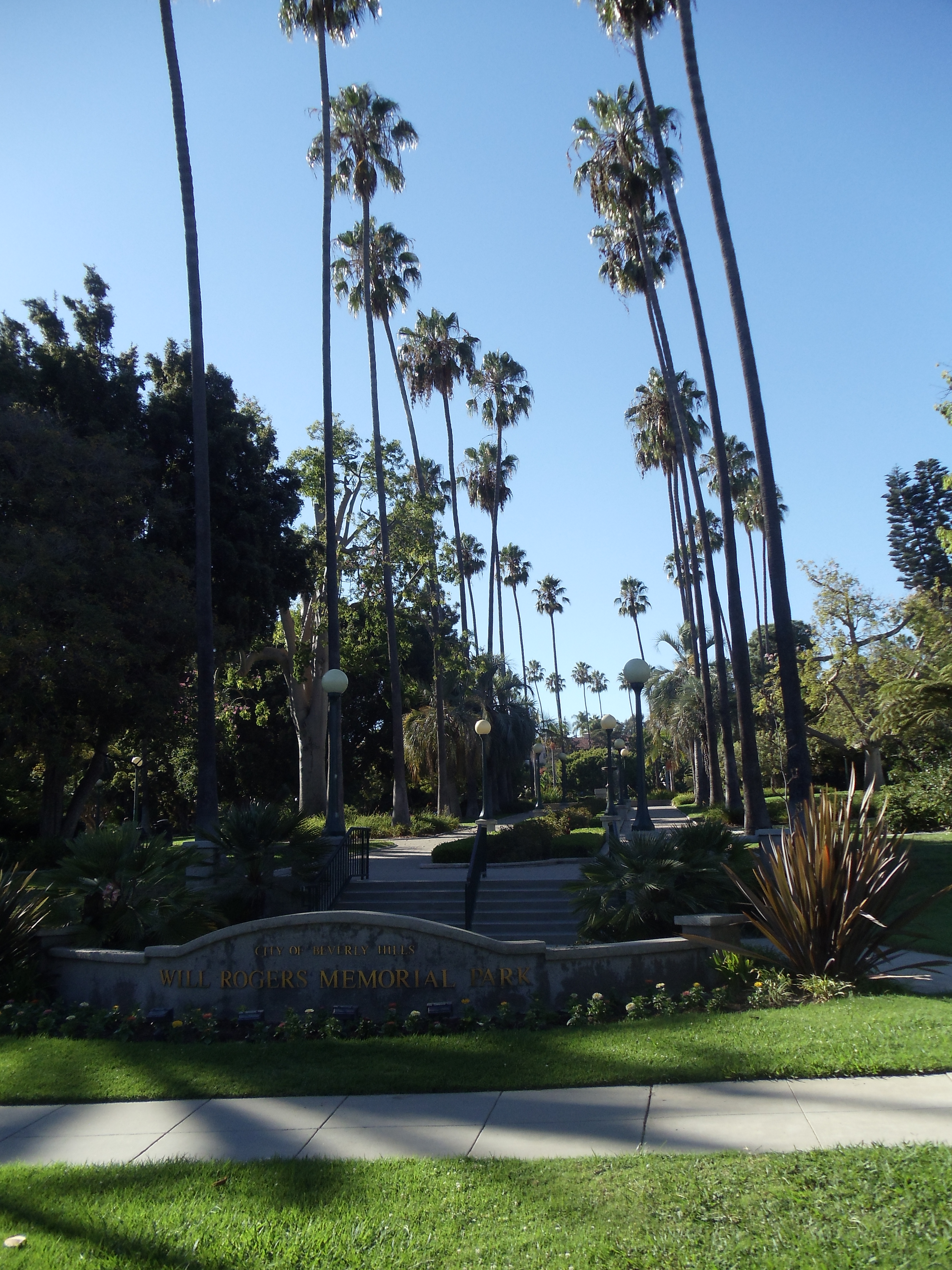
- Will Rogers Memorial Park
- Interactive map of Will Rogers Memorial Park
- Type: Municipal
- Location: 9650 Sunset Boulevard, Beverly Hills, California
- Coordinates: 34.0804°N 118.4125°W
- Area: 5 acres (2.0 ha)
- Created: 1915

The Will Rogers Memorial Park is a public park in Beverly Hills, California.

== Location ==
Shaped like a triangle, the park is surrounded by West Sunset Boulevard, North Canon Drive and North Beverly Drive. It is across the street (south side of Sunset) from the Beverly Hills Hotel. It covers an area of 5 acres (2.0 hectares).

== Overview ==
The park includes a pond with fish and turtles, and a fountain in the middle. It also includes lawns, rose gardens, tall palm trees, a dragon tree, winding asphalt paths, and men's and women's restrooms. It also features two bronze plaques about the history of the park, and a smaller plaque about the Beverly Hills Garden Club.

== History ==
The park was constructed in 1912 and dedicated in 1915, becoming the first public park in Beverly Hills.

In 1921, scenes of the Charlie Chaplin film The Idle Class were filmed at this park. In 1932, some scenes of the film Pack Up Your Troubles, featuring the double act Laurel & Hardy, were filmed in the park.

It was called the Sunset Park until 1952, when it was renamed the Will Rogers Memorial Park in honor of Will Rogers, who served as the first Honorary Mayor of Beverly Hills from 1926 to 1928 and frequented the park often with his family. On May 18, 1957, a plaque was added to celebrate the twenty-fifth anniversary of the Beverly Hills Garden Club.

As explained on one of the historical plaques, the park was rededicated in 1997 and renovated in 2005.

On April 7, 1998, singer George Michael was arrested for committing a "lewd act" by Marcelo Rodriguez, a plainclothes officer of the Beverly Hills Police Department, in the restrooms of the park. The singer parodied the arrest in his video of Outside, which led the police officer to sue him for US$10 million for "humiliation, mental anguish, emotional and physical distress" because of the video.

In September 2014, the fountain was renamed the Margaret J. Anderson Fountain, in honor of the first owner of the Beverly Hills Hotel.

In October 2014, 160 Beverly Hills Centennial Roses, a type of floribunda rose registered for the city's centennial, were planted in the park. The dedication took place on October 5. The rose garden is the result of a donation from Dr. Keith Zary, a rose breeder.

== Gallery ==
Will Rogers Memorial Park
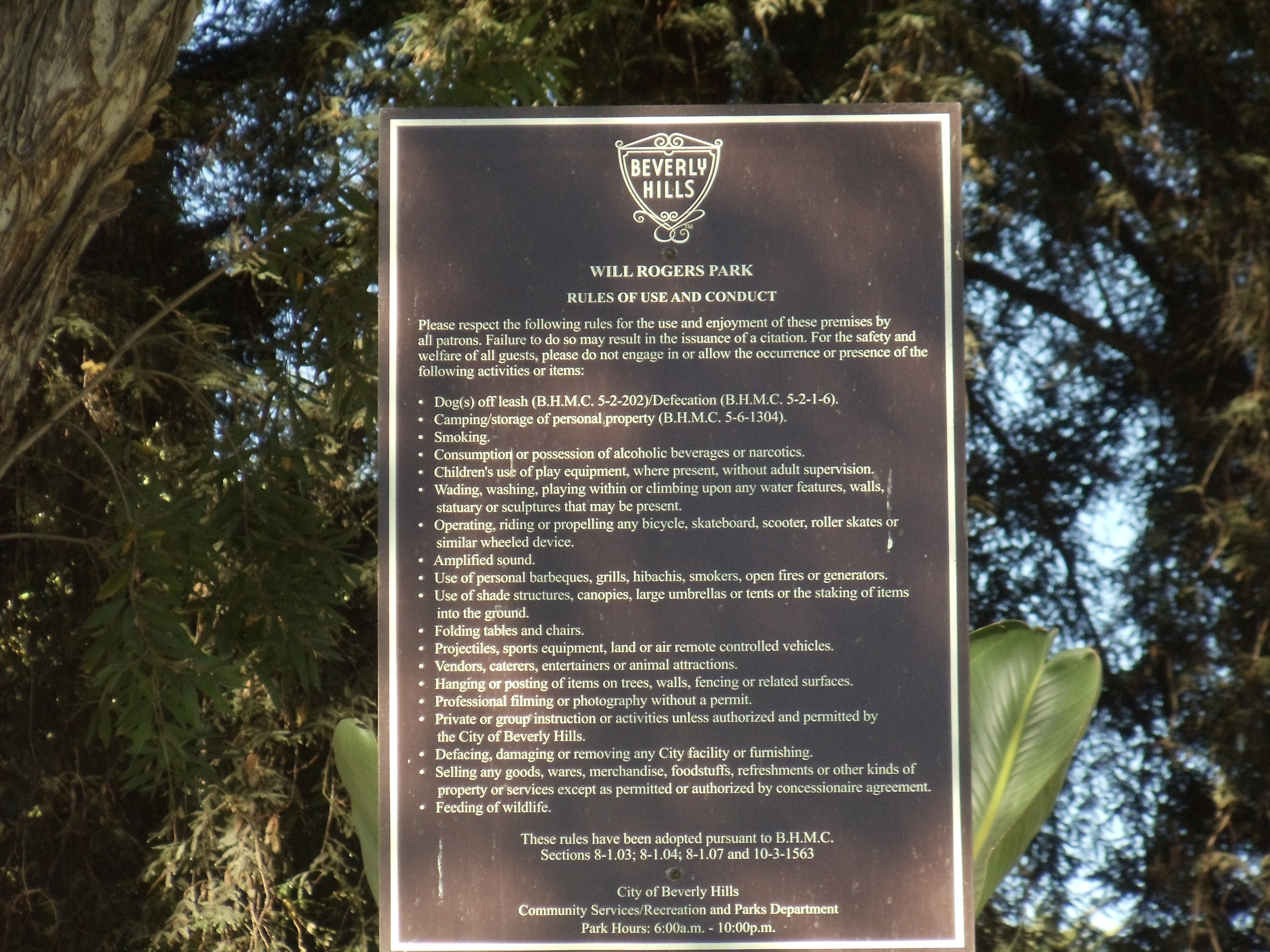
Sign of Use and Conduct of the Will Rogers Memorial Park

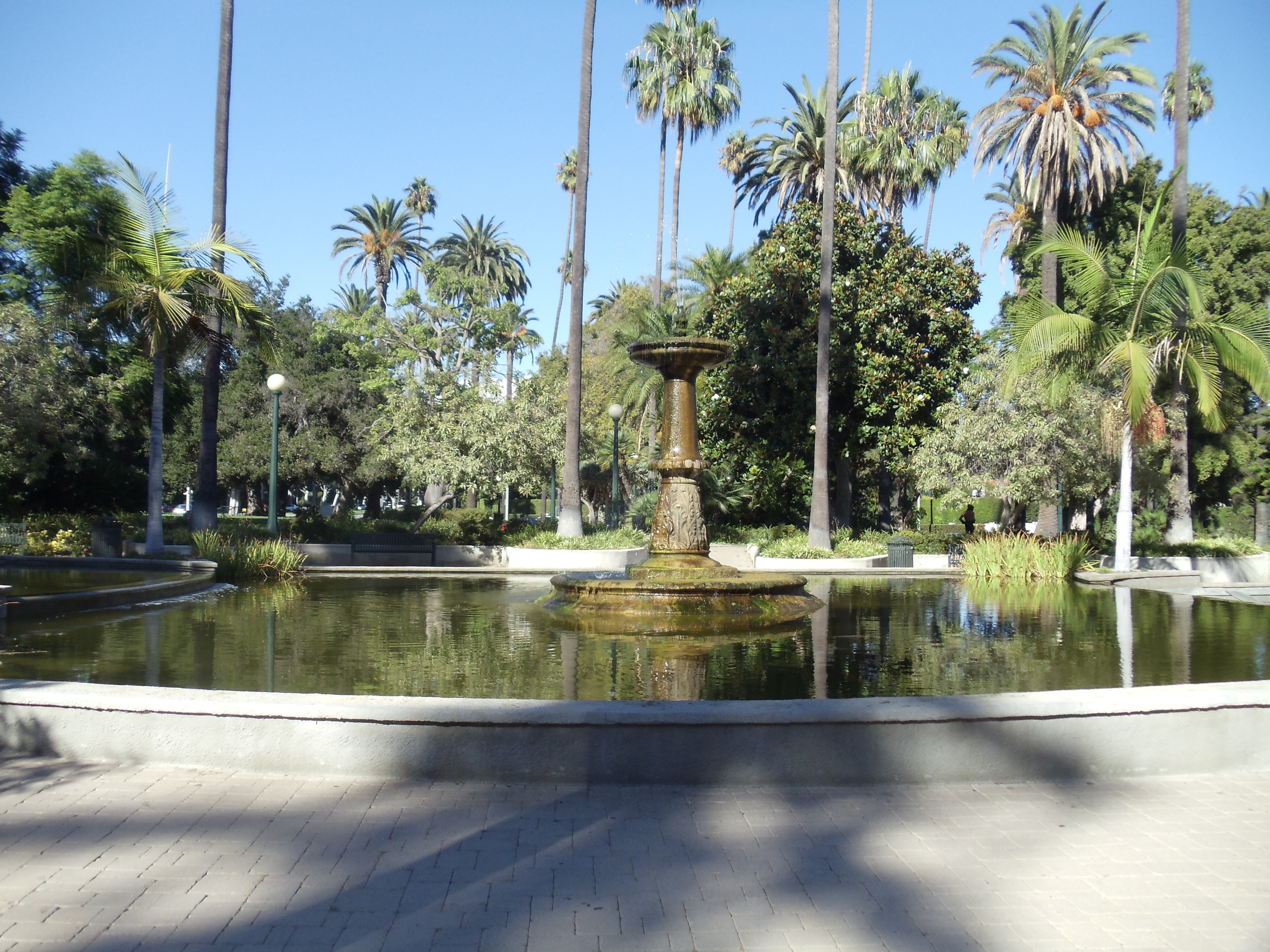
View of the Margaret J. Anderson Fountain in the Will Rogers Memorial Park

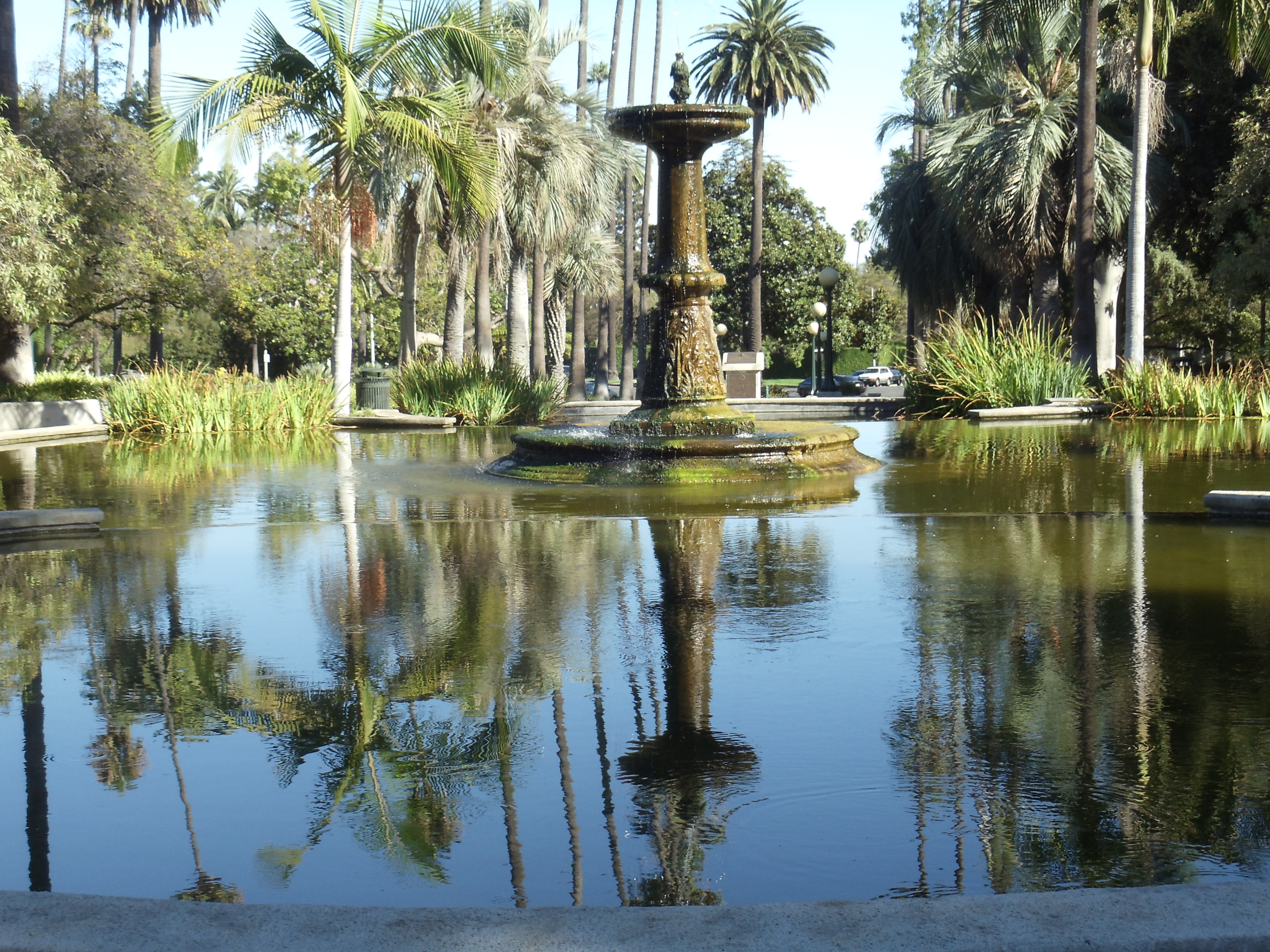
View of the Margaret J. Anderson Fountain in the Will Rogers Memorial Park

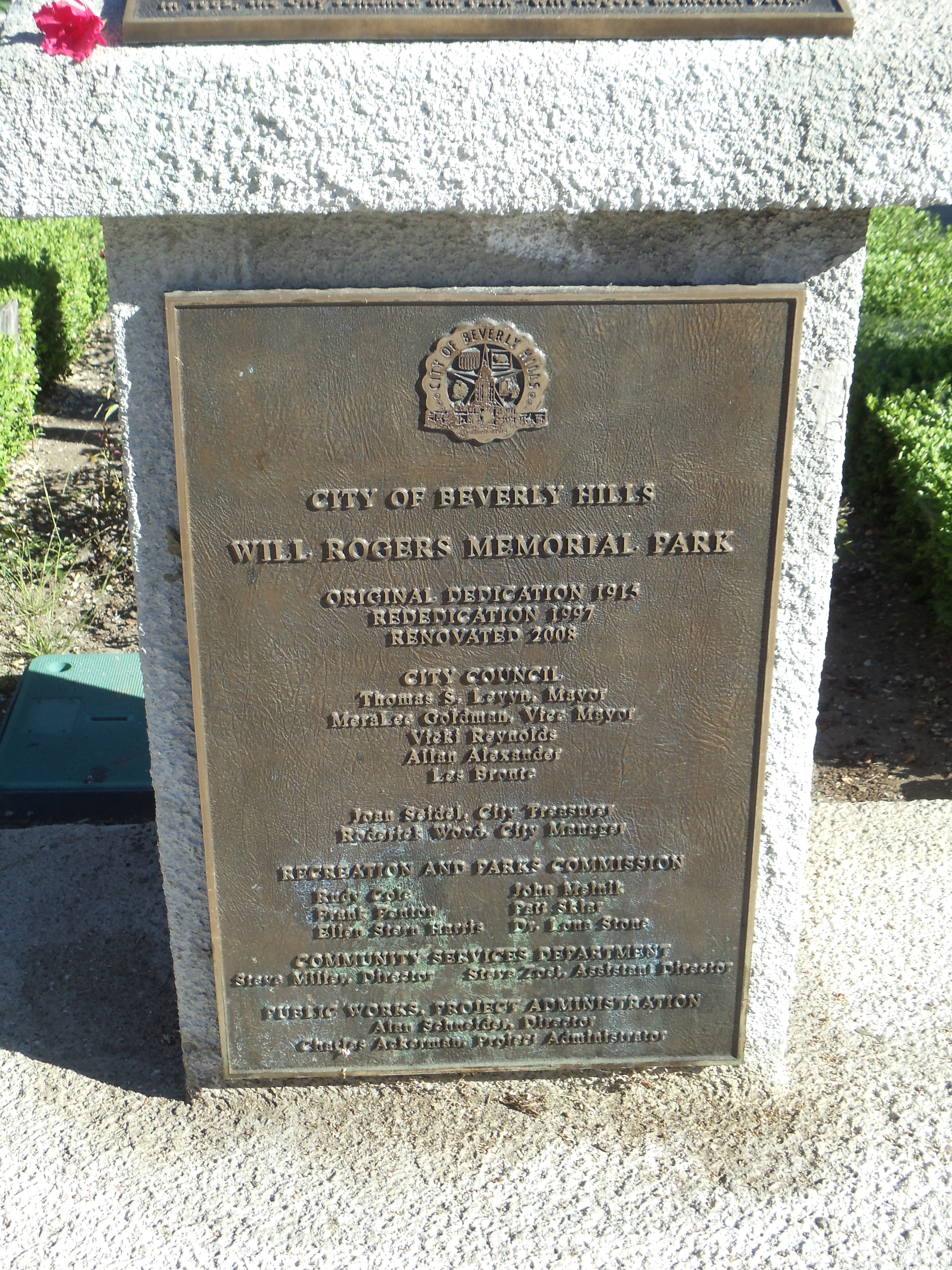
Bronze plaque about the Will Rogers Memorial Park in Beverly Hills, California

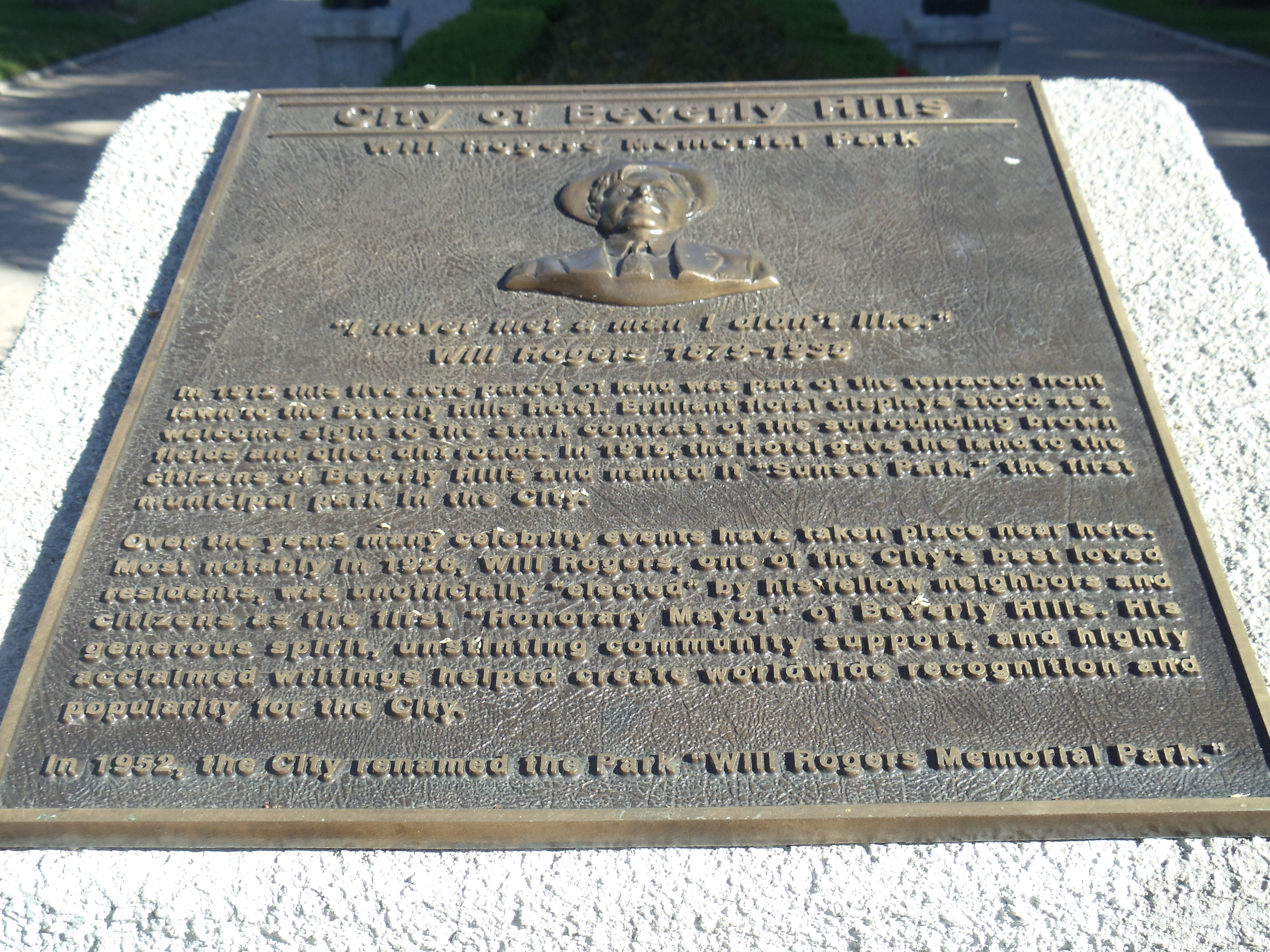
Another bronze plaque about the Will Rogers Memorial Park

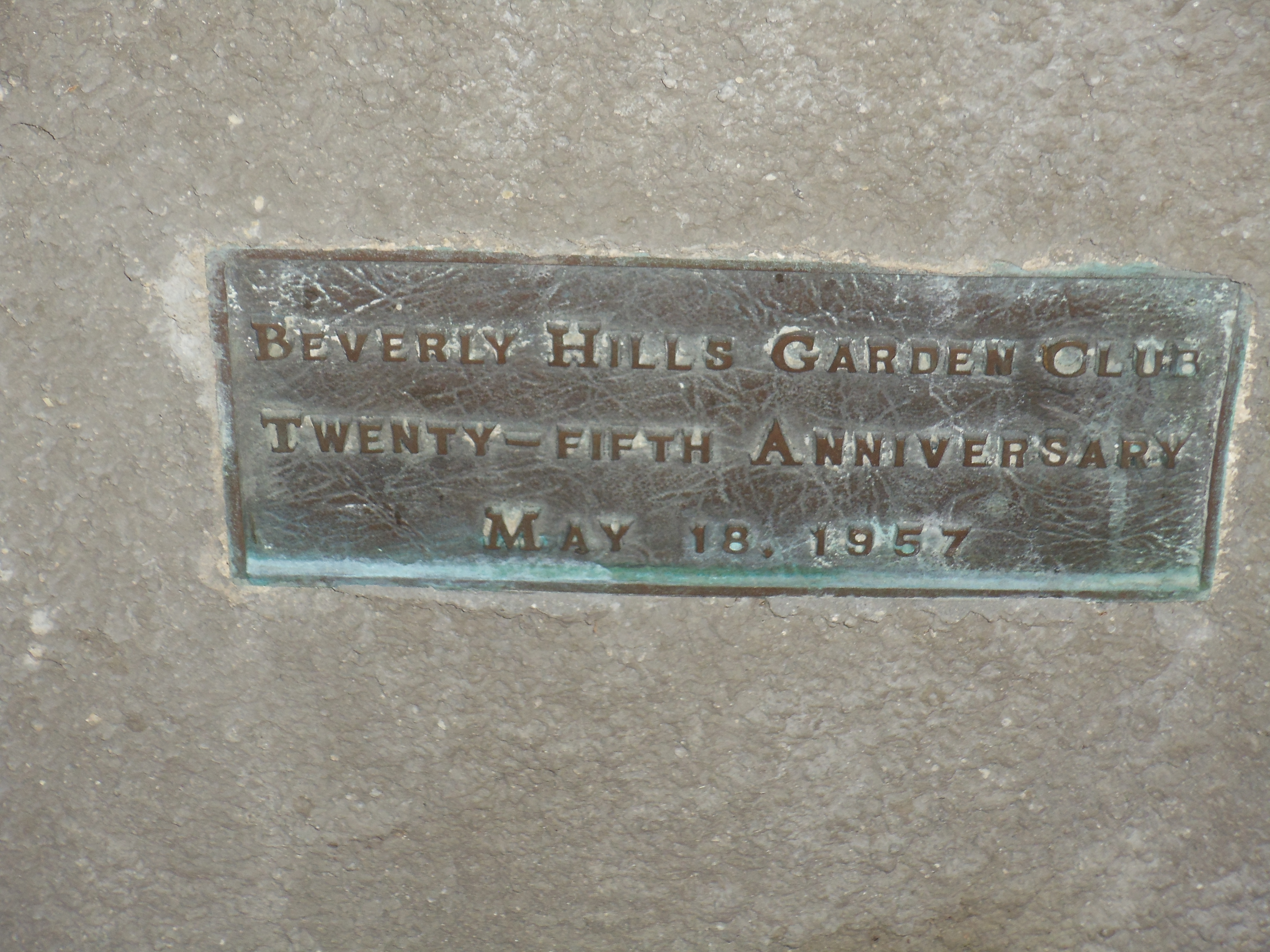
Plaque of the Beverly Hills Garden Club in the Will Rogers Memorial Park

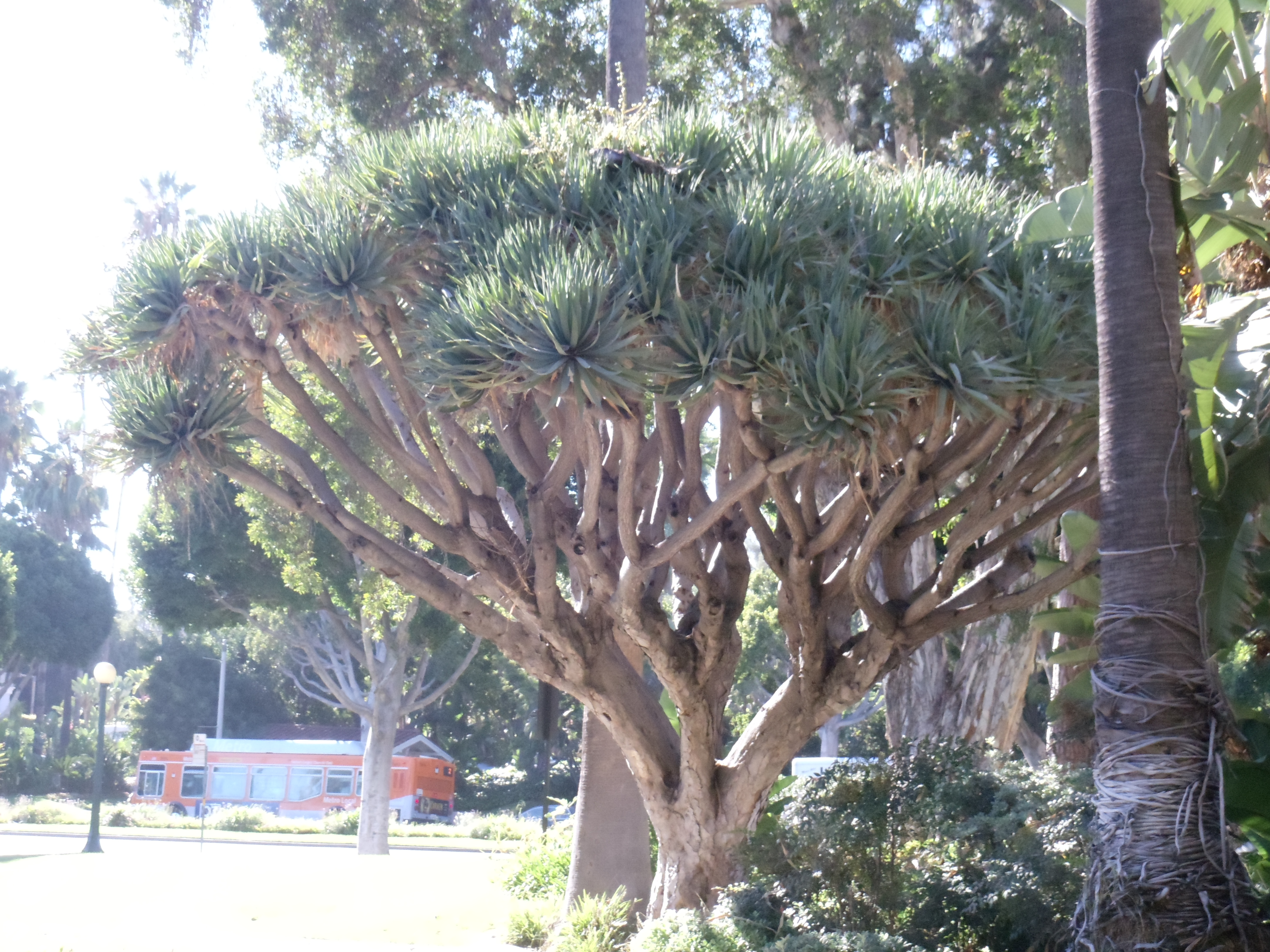
Dragon Tree (Dracaena draco) in the Will Rogers Memorial Park

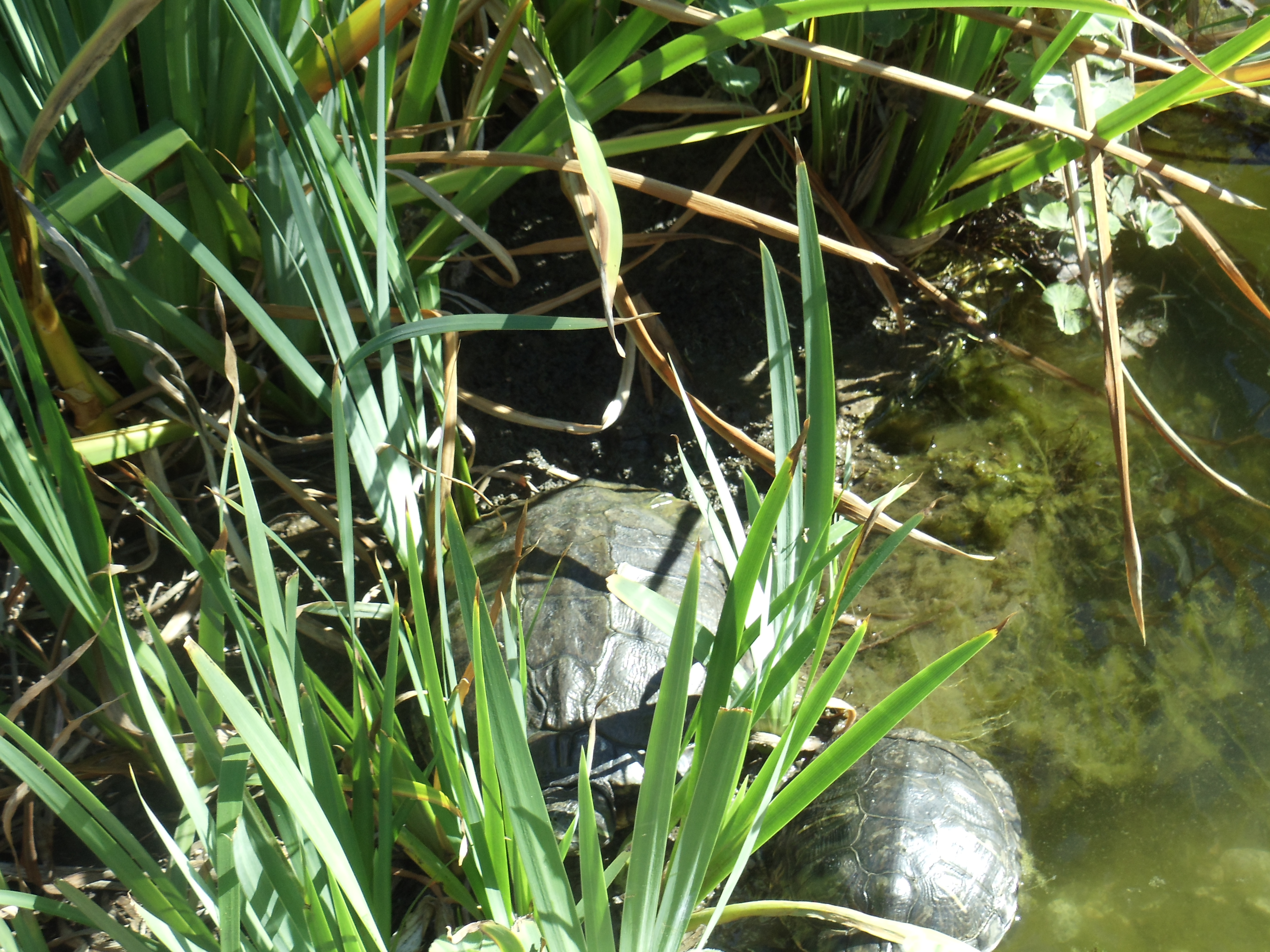
Turtles in the Will Rogers Memorial Park

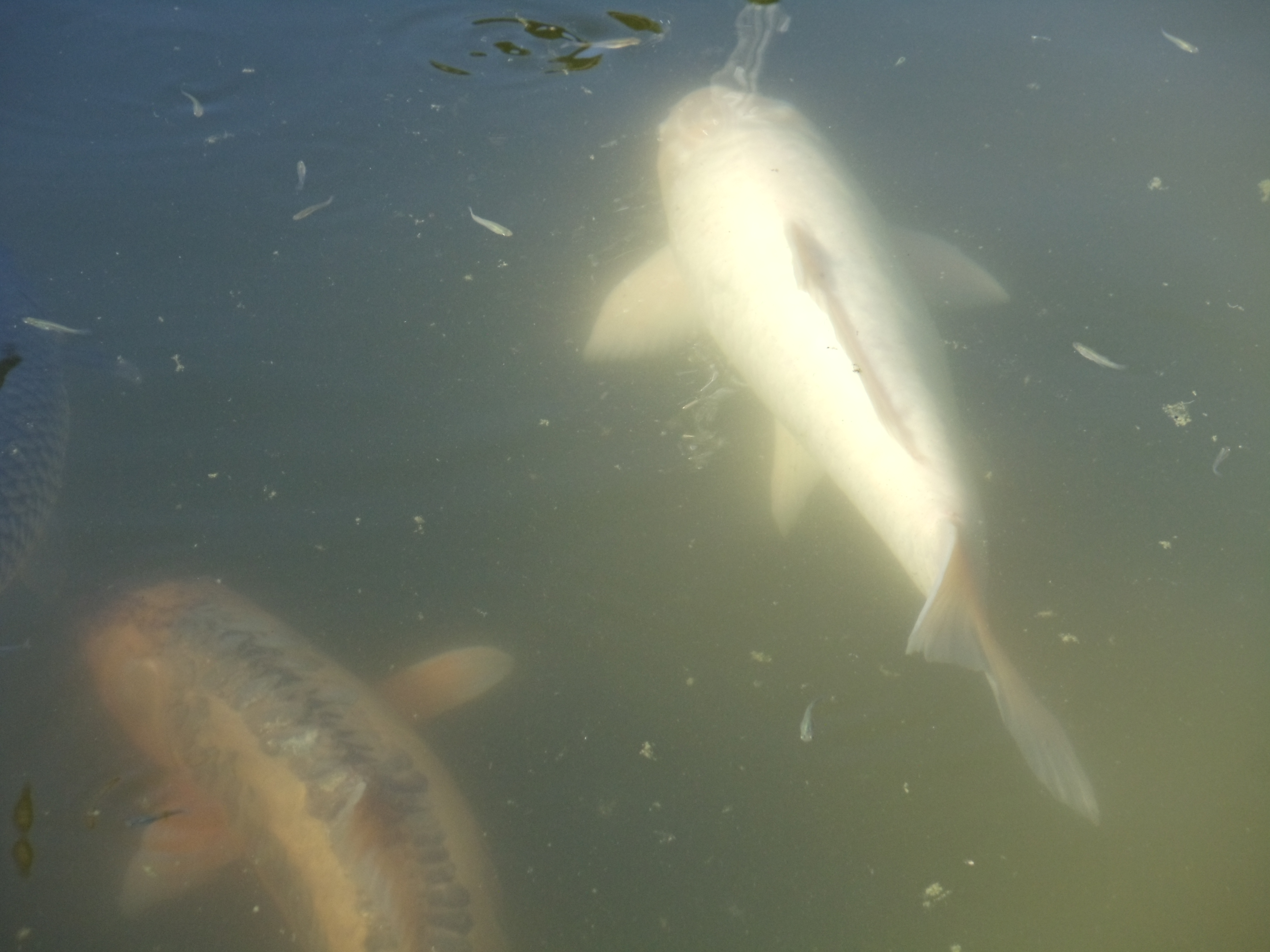
Koi fish in the Will Rogers Memorial Park
