= The Beverly Hills Hotel =

Famous California hotel

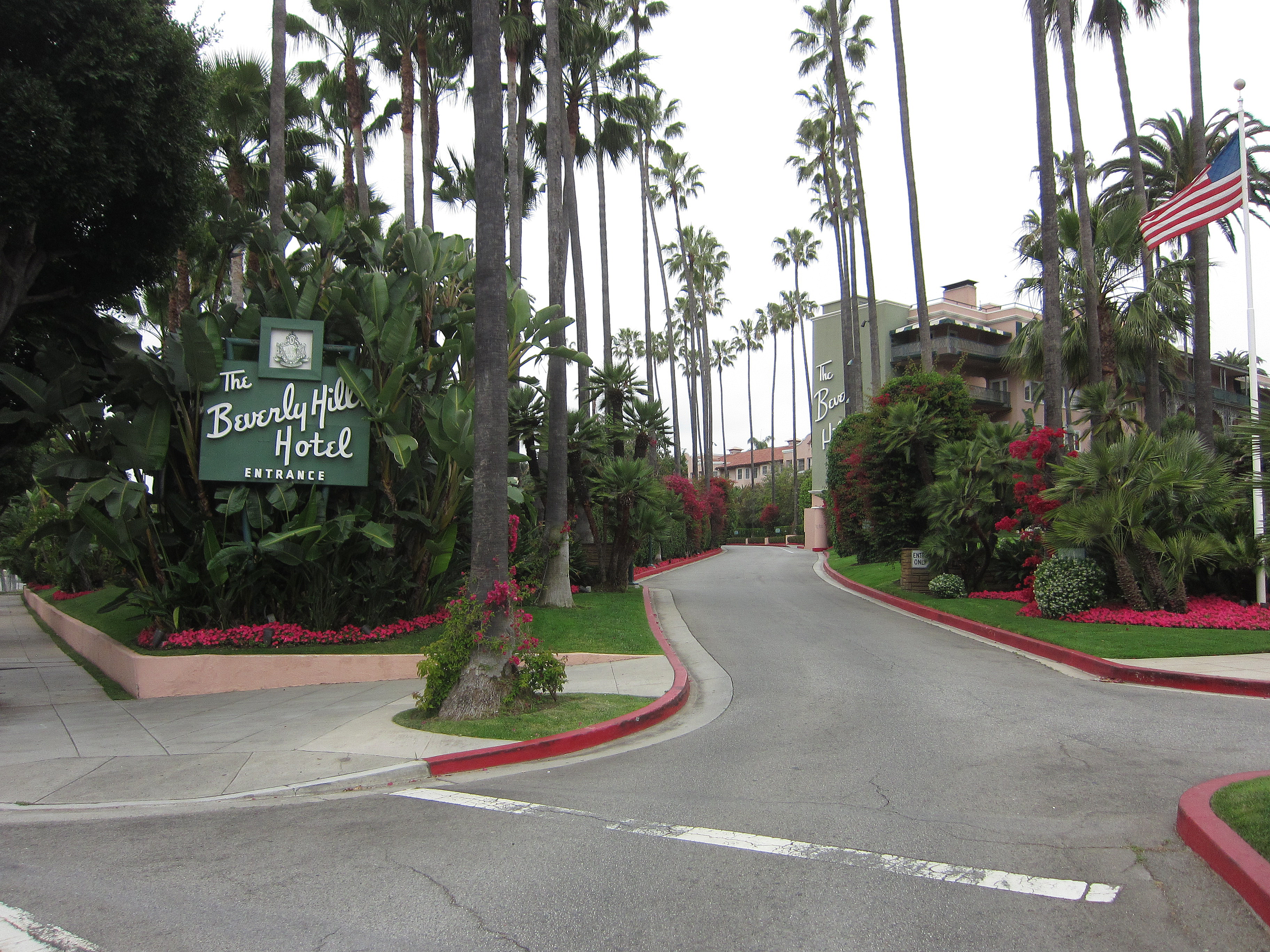
- The entrance to the hotel

General information
- Status: Completed
- Type: Hotel
- Architectural style: Mediterranean Revival
- Location: 9641 Sunset Boulevard, Beverly Hills, California, United States
- Coordinates: 34°4′53.17″N 118°24′49.29″W
- Opened: May 12, 1912
- Owner: Dorchester Collection

Design and construction
- Architect: Elmer Grey
- Developer: Margaret and Stanley Anderson
- Awards: Michelin key
- Designations: City of Beverly Hills Historic Landmark

Renovating team
- Architect: Paul R. Williams (1940s)

Other information
- Number of rooms: 210 rooms 23 bungalows
- Number of restaurants: 4 (Bar Nineteen12; Cabana Cafe; Fountain Coffee Room; Polo Lounge)
- Facilities: Spa, swimming pool
- Parking: Valet parking

Website
- Official website

The Beverly Hills Hotel, also called the Beverly Hills Hotel and Bungalows, is located on Sunset Boulevard in Beverly Hills, California. One of the world's best-known hotels, it is closely associated with Hollywood film stars, rock stars, and celebrities. The hotel has 210 guest rooms and suites and 23 bungalows and the exterior bears the hotel's signature pink and green colors.

The Beverly Hills Hotel was established in May 1912, before the city itself was incorporated. The original owners were Margaret J. Anderson, a wealthy widow, and her son, Stanley S. Anderson, who had been managing the Hollywood Hotel. The original hotel was designed by Pasadena architect Elmer Grey in the Mediterranean Revival style. From 1928 to 1932, the hotel was owned by the Interstate Company. In 1941, Hernando Courtright, a vice president of the Bank of America, purchased the hotel with friends including Irene Dunne, Loretta Young, and Harry Warner. Courtright established the Polo Lounge, which is considered to be one of the premier dining spots in Los Angeles, hosting entertainers ranging from the Rat Pack to Humphrey Bogart and Marlene Dietrich. The hotel was first painted its famous pink color during a 1948 renovation to match that period's country club style. The following year, architect Paul Williams added the Crescent Wing.

The strict resident owner of the Beverly Hills Hotel from 1958 until his death in 1979 was former Detroit real estate magnate Ben L. Silberstein. In 1986, Marvin Davis bought the hotel from Silberstein's son-in-law Ivan Boesky. Less than a year later, Davis sold the hotel to the Sultan of Brunei. On December 30, 1992, the hotel closed for a complete restoration, reopening on June 3, 1995. Since 1996, it has been run as part of the Dorchester Collection. In 2012, the hotel was named the first historic landmark in Beverly Hills, and two new Presidential Bungalows were added.

The song "Hotel California" by the American rock band the Eagles is slightly based on the folklore behind the hotel. The cover of the band's album of the same name features a photo of the hotel itself.

== History ==
=== Early history ===
In early 1911, Margaret J. Anderson, a wealthy widow, and her son, Stanley S. Anderson, who had been managing the Hollywood Hotel, ordered the construction of the Beverly Hills Hotel, in close proximity to the Burton Green mansion. Burton Green, an oil tycoon and real estate developer, President of the Rodeo Land and Water Company, had purchased land in the foothills of the Santa Monica Mountains, which had once been owned by the Mexican government. He had begun building mansions on the land, including his own residence, investing some $500,000, but was having difficulty selling them. He hired Anderson to build a hotel, which he named Beverly Farms, after his home in Massachusetts, believing that it would attract people to the area, billing it as "halfway between Los Angeles and the sea". The Hollywood film industry was taking off at the time, and investors were looking to develop the area. A May 11, 1911 edition of the Los Angeles Times announced the news that a "huge Mission-style hotel" was to be built by Anderson, with the motto that "her guests were entitled to the best of everything regardless of cost".

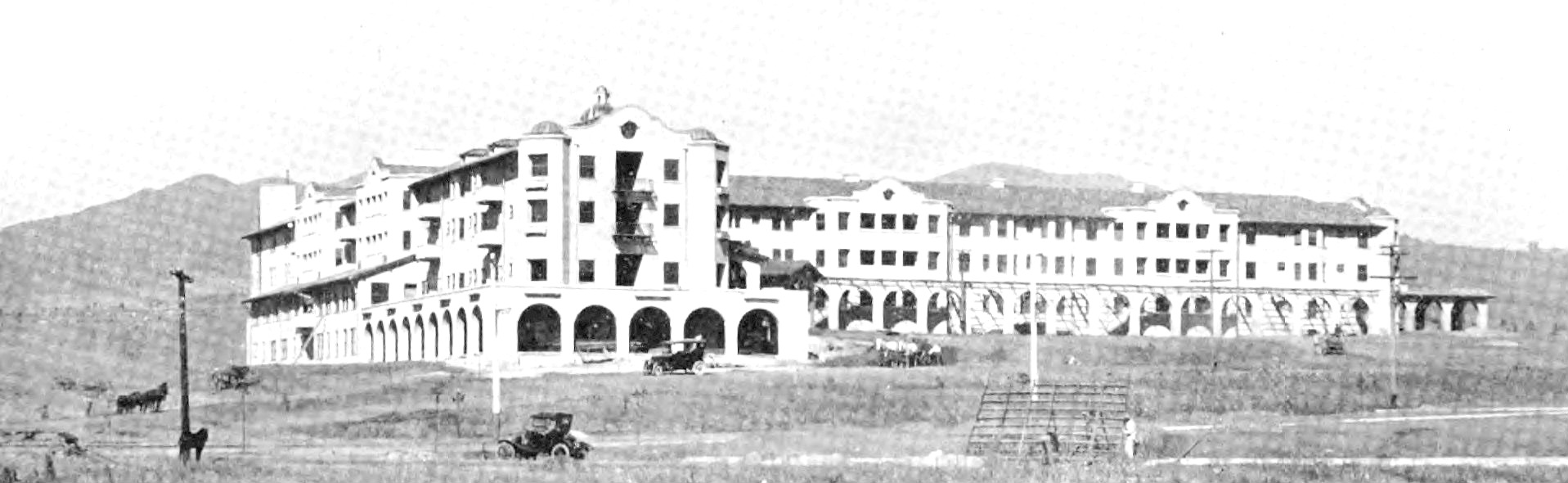
The Beverly Hills Hotel under construction in 1912

The hotel opened May 12, 1912, before the city's existence. Margaret and Stanley took up residence within the hotel grounds. By 1914, Hollywood directors, actors, and actresses, such as Mary Pickford and Douglas Fairbanks, Charlie Chaplin, Gloria Swanson, Buster Keaton, Rudolph Valentino, and Will Rogers, had purchased homes in the area, "transforming bean fields surrounding The Beverly Hills Hotel into prime real estate". The city of Beverly Hills was established in 1914. The first five bungalows of the hotel were built in 1915. In 1919, Douglas Fairbanks and his wife, Mary Pickford, bought and expanded a lodge above the hotel, which they named Pickfair. According to one publication, a star would know they had finally "made it" when they received an invitation to dine at Pickfair. Gloria Swanson resided in one of the bungalows of the hotel during her divorce.

In 1915, the Andersons donated a portion of the hotel's original grounds to the community of Beverly Hills. It was used to create the community's first public park. Originally known as Sunset Park, it is now Will Rogers Memorial Park. An early tradition was the annual Easter egg hunt, put on for the children of the guests and employees.

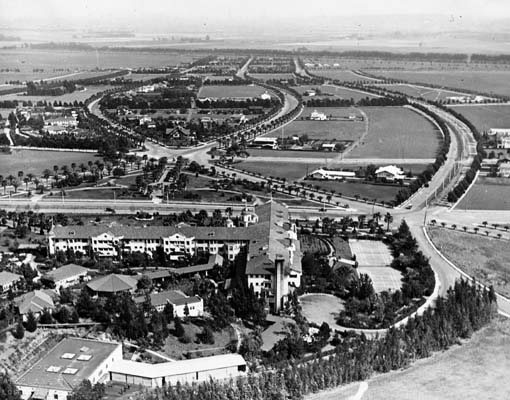
Overlooking the back of the hotel and Beverly Hills in 1921

Silent film star Harold Lloyd was an early hotel patron, and in 1921, he decided to film a scene at the hotel for A Sailor-Made Man. From 1928 to 1932, the hotel was owned by the Interstate Company. Interstate had to close the hotel during the Great Depression years, although the company leased the bungalows out as rental properties. With Bank of America funding, the hotel reopened in 1932.

=== The glamour years ===
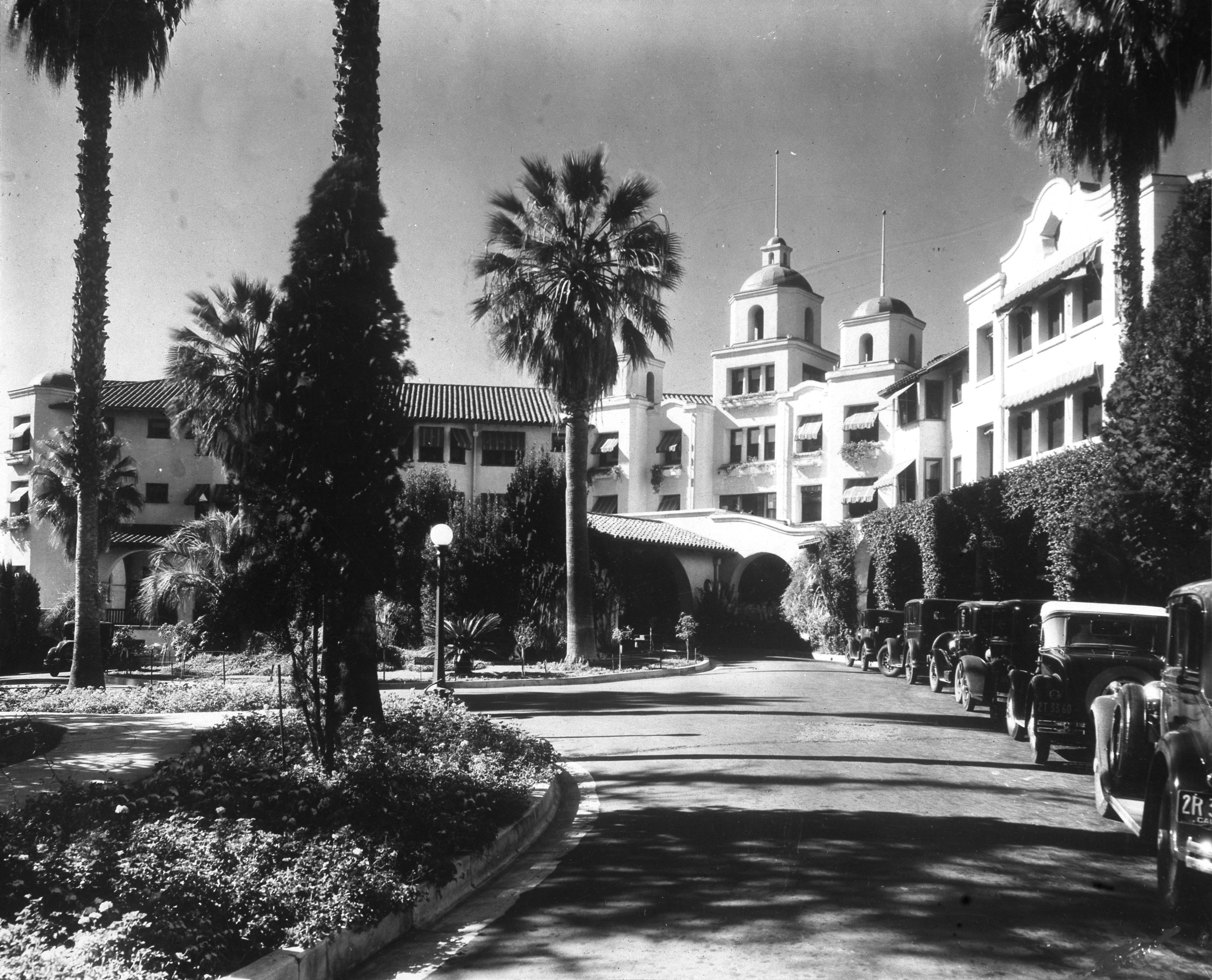
The hotel in 1925

During the 1930s, the Beverly Hills Hotel became increasingly popular with Hollywood film stars. Fred Astaire took a shine to the hotel and enjoyed reading Daily Variety and The Hollywood Reporter by the pool. Cesar Romero and Carole Lombard were pictured together at the hotel in 1937. In 1938, the Sand and Pool Club was established at the hotel. It proved extremely popular, with white sand imported from Arizona, which made the pool area look like a beach. The following year, it began hosting fashion shows sponsored by local department stores, such as Bullock's Wilshire. In 1940, one of the hotel's long-time patrons, Marlene Dietrich, was instrumental in bringing about a change in policy in the Polo Lounge, which had made it compulsory for women to don skirts, which she refused to wear.

In 1941, Hernando Courtright, a vice president of the Bank of America, purchased the hotel with friends. Irene Dunne, Loretta Young, and Harry Warner also became owners of the hotel as a result of their investment with Courtright. Courtright established the Polo Lounge "in honor of a celebrity band of polo players who toasted victories at the restaurant after matches in the bean fields". In 1942, Howard Hughes bought up half a dozen of the bungalows and lived there on several occasions throughout the decades. The hotel accommodated his eccentricities, including his request for "roast beef sandwiches delivered to a nook in a tree". The Beverly Hills Hotel underwent significant renovation in the late forties when the porte cochere was expanded and painted in stripes. In 1947, Courtright opened the Crystal Room and the Lanai Restaurant, later called The Coterie. The building was first painted its famous pink color in 1948 to match the country club style of the period, and it became known as "the Pink Palace". The following year, architect Paul Williams added the Crescent Wing. The Fountain Coffee Shop also opened at this time.

Back in the days when celebrity was worn with the elegance and grace of diamonds and mink, the Beverly Hills Hotel was where the stars played. W.C. Fields, Humphrey Bogart and the Rat Pack tippled at the bar, Katharine Hepburn did a back flip into the pool in her tennis clothes, and Elizabeth Taylor honeymooned in the bungalows out back – six times. The Beverly Hills Hotel, known affectionately as "the pink palace," is as Old Hollywood as it gets. Joan Crawford regularly pulled up for lunch in a chauffeured Rolls-Royce the color of money, the Beatles slipped in through the back door for an after-hours dip in the pool, and Sidney Poitier danced barefoot in the lobby after winning an Oscar for Lilies of the Field. ... Over the years, Hollywood discovered that the hotel's original 21 bungalows made an ideal spot to write a screenplay (Neil Simon), have a secret affair (Warren Beatty, pre-Annette Benning [sic]), and recover from plastic surgery or a broken marriage.

— CNN on The Beverly Hills Hotel.

In 1954, Detroit real estate magnate Ben L. Silberstein offered to buy the hotel for $4 million. The deal was finally completed in 1958 for a reported $6 million. Courtright later became the hotelier at the Beverly Wilshire Hotel. The reputation of the Beverly Hills Hotel, as a leading luxury hotel with glamorous patrons, took off during the 1950s and attracted eminent guests, such as the Duke and Duchess of Windsor, Princess Margaret and Lord Snowdon, King Albert II of Belgium, Rainier III, Prince of Monaco and Princess Grace, John Wayne, and Henry Fonda. Elizabeth Taylor, one of the hotel's best-known guests, would stay with her numerous husbands in the bungalows and spent six of her eight honeymoons there. Her father owned an art gallery on the ground floor of the hotel. The Polo Lounge became associated with Frank Sinatra, Dean Martin, and the Rat Pack, where they held heavy drinking bouts. In 1956, the pool of the hotel and cabana club was a filming location for Designing Woman, starring Gregory Peck and Lauren Bacall. Marilyn Monroe and Yves Montand stayed at the hotel during the production of George Cukor's Let's Make Love. Monroe's favorite bungalow was No. 7. George Hamilton and Rex Harrison enjoyed sunbathing at the hotel; Harrison would sunbathe in the nude in Cabana One and answer the door wearing "just a handkerchief over his private parts".

In 1963, the comedy picture Who's Been Sleeping in My Bed?, starring Dean Martin, Elizabeth Montgomery, Jill St. John, and Carol Burnett, was shot at the hotel. In the 1970s, John Lennon and Yoko Ono hid out in one of the bungalows for a week. Richard M. Nixon's chief of staff, H.R. Haldeman, and presidential aide John Ehrlichman were eating breakfast in the Polo Lounge when they were informed of the Watergate burglary in 1972. In January 1977, Peter Finch died of a sudden heart attack while sitting in the hotel lobby. Two months later, he was posthumously awarded the Academy Award for Best Actor for his role as Howard Beale in the film Network. His costar Faye Dunaway stayed at the hotel after winning the Academy Award for Best Actress for the same film; in one memorable photograph, she was seated by the hotel pool lounging back in a chair surrounded by newspapers and her Oscar trophy. The exterior of the hotel was featured in the cover art of the Eagles' album Hotel California that same year. Two years later, California Suite was filmed at the hotel.

=== Later history ===
Owner Ben Silberstein died in 1979 and passed the hotel to his two daughters, Muriel Slatkin and Seema Boesky, wife of stock trader Ivan Boesky. Boesky bought the outstanding 5% of stock for a reported fortune and decided to sell, despite Slatkin's desire to keep the hotel. In 1986, Marvin Davis bought the hotel from Boesky for $136 million. Less than a year later, Davis sold the hotel to the Sultan of Brunei, Hassanal Bolkiah, for $110 million.

On December 30, 1992, the hotel closed for a complete restoration, said to be in the region of $100–125 million. The project lasted two and a half years with the hotel reopening on June 3, 1995, with upgrades to furniture and fittings. This was not unopposed, with a group of patrons including Irving Link expressing their displeasure. Since 1996 the hotel has been managed and owned by the Dorchester Collection, organized in 1996 to manage the hotel interests of the Brunei Investment Agency. In 2011, the West Coast regional director for the Dorchester Collection, Edward Mady, became the general manager of the Beverly Hills Hotel, as well as the Hotel Bel-Air. Mady was awarded the 2011 Hospitality Professional of the Year Award from the Food and Beverage Association and Hotels Magazine's 2017 Hotelier of the World award. In 2012, the hotel celebrated its 100-year anniversary and began to remodel its lobby, with the Polo Lounge, pool cabanas and Cabana Cafe, and guest-rooms and suites to be renovated by 2014. The hotel was also named the first historic landmark in Beverly Hills in September 2012. In 2022, John Scanlon became the hotel's general manager.

=== Controversy and boycott ===
A boycott of the hotel began in April 2014, when the Sultan of Brunei, part owner of the hotel, began changing Brunei's complex legal system to include aspects of Sharia law, and in particular, codifying the persecution of homosexuals. In protest, a United States national LGBT advocacy organization, the Gill Action Fund, canceled its reservation to hold a conference of major donors at the Beverly Hills Hotel and demanded a refund of its deposit. The hotel management responded by asserting that it does not discriminate on the basis of sexual orientation.

Fashion designers Brian Atwood and Peter Som subsequently called for wider protests, urging the fashion industry to boycott all the hotels owned by the Dorchester Collection. Meanwhile, the boycott had attracted support from Sir Richard Branson of Virgin Group, as well as numerous Hollywood executives and stars, including Jay Leno and Ellen DeGeneres. A string of organizations joined the boycott, cancelling reservations to hold conferences and other high-profile events at the establishment; travel industry firms signed on to a boycott of all Dorchester Collection hotels. Others, including Russell Crowe and Kim Kardashian, spoke out against the boycott. Crowe said that despite his disapproval of the new laws in Brunei, it is unfair to punish the hardworking employees of the hotel. Similarly, Kardashian published a blog post voicing her criticism of the boycott and expressing her sympathies for the hotel workers. HR Magazine said that the protests are "misguided" and will not affect the government policy of Brunei when the Dorchester Collection's annual revenue is $300 million, while the BIA has over $30 billion in assets from oil and gas.

In May 2014, the Beverly Hills City Council passed a resolution urging the Sultan of Brunei to sell the hotel. Lili Bosse, the then-mayor of Beverly Hills, welcomed the resolution and added that she had made a "personal decision" not to return to the hotel until the situation had been resolved. The decision was lauded by Rabbi Laura Geller of Temple Emanuel, where Bosse is a congregant. By then, the Jewish Journal reported that "more than $2 million worth of events have been canceled at the Beverly Hills Hotel by dozens of groups." Dorchester Collection Chief Executive Officer Christopher Cowdray asked the public to consider that many brands are backed by foreign investors. Sharia law exists alongside other normative systems and has been adopted by many other Muslim countries, including Saudi Arabia, which has major investments in the American hospitality industry, including the Four Seasons and Fairmont hotel chains.

Adweek declared that "the bad press and protests have tarnished the glamorous image of the Beverly Hills Hotel, one of the most famous hotels in the world", and added that "such extreme brand damage will be difficult to repair".

The hotel and other Dorchester properties faced renewed calls for boycott in April 2019, when Brunei made gay sex and adultery punishable by death by stoning. The boycott attracted support from LA City Comptroller Ron Galperin and more celebrities, including George Clooney and Elton John. The LA City Council passed a resolution to bar the city from conducting business at the hotel and urging city residents not to patronize it. The Dorchester Collection responded by saying they "do not tolerate any form of discrimination." In May 2019, the Sultan of Brunei said that his country's "de facto moratorium" on capital punishment would apply to cases under the new laws, and promised to ratify the UN Convention against Torture. Despite this, LA City Councilman Paul Koretz asked the city to continue its boycott of the hotel.

=== COVID-19 response ===
During the COVID-19 pandemic, the hotel remained open, but was forced to reschedule the events it had planned for the summer and fall of 2020. The hotel engaged in multiple donation campaigns to various organizations, such as the Children's Hospital Los Angeles and the Hollywood Food Coalition. The hotel also fed frontline healthcare workers at L.A. hospitals via the Polo Lounge, an idea stemming from the hotel's general manager, Edward Mady. The hotel also redesigned its sign for the first time in 70 years to honor those same frontline healthcare workers.

== Architecture ==
=== Exterior ===
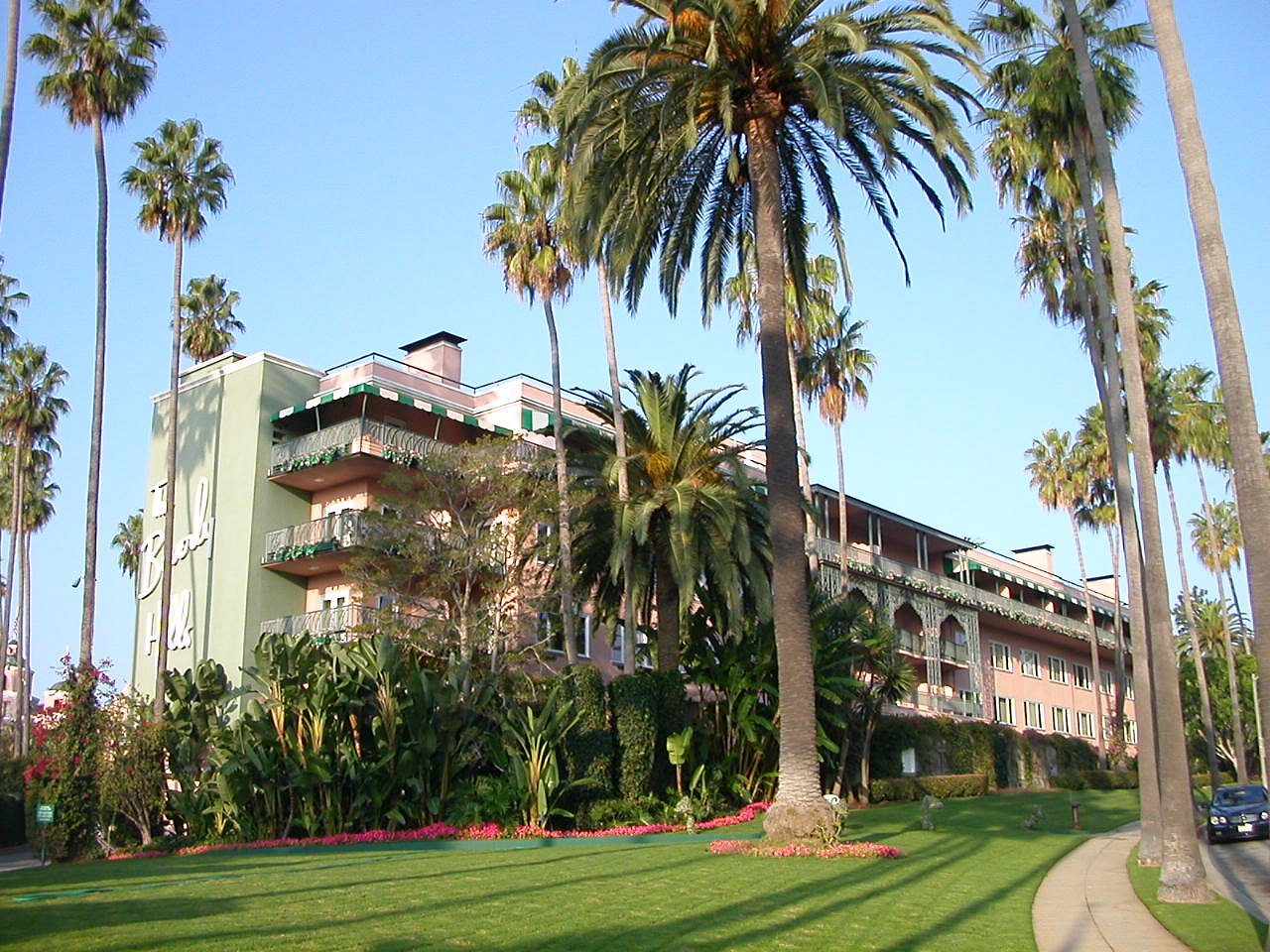
The east wing (called the "New Wing"), from Crescent Drive

Judith Kirkwood of Orange Coast Magazine has stated that "The Beverly Hills Hotel is such an icon that my friend, Gretchen, and I wondered if it was a mirage when the taxi pulled up in the porte cochere and deposited us on a red carpet, but realized that it was "more like a peachy pink dream dusted with gold — and green and white striped accents".

The original main building of the Beverly Hills Hotel was designed by Pasadena architect Elmer Grey, in the Mediterranean Revival style. Built on a prominence above the main road below, it resembled a white colonial palatial mansion or mission, with verandas and arches fitted with wicker furniture, and at the time was set in the countryside. High above the main entrance are three domes, two flanking the center, which are smaller and lower in height, with flags hoisted on them. A trolley-stop pavilion was situated on the western side. The iconic signage and the addition were designed by architect Paul Williams.

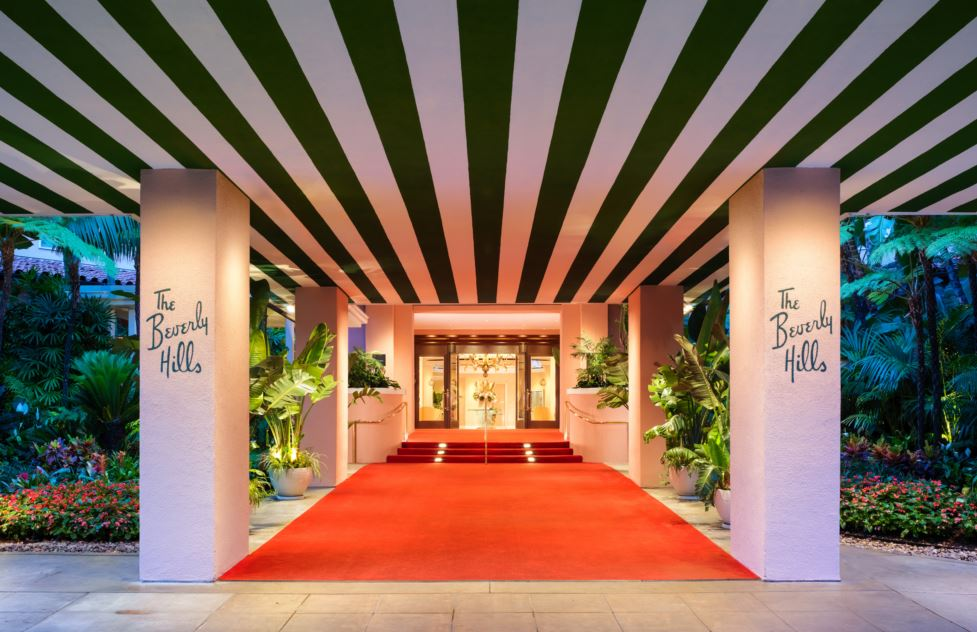
The entrance (shown in 2015) has had this same look for many decades.

The extensive gardens, covering 12 acres (4.9 ha), were designed by landscape architect Wilbur David Cook. They contain bougainvillea, banana plants, hibiscus, and other tropical flora. Svend Petersen, the Danish-American pool manager at the hotel for forty-two years, became a Hotel Ambassador in 2002. He had notably opened up the pool after hours for the Beatles and taught Faye Dunaway to swim a 1940s freestyle crawl for her appearance in the film Mommie Dearest.

=== Interior ===
A room known as the Crystal Room was allocated for small private dinner parties. The principal dining room could accommodate up to 500 people. The children's dining room, which became the El Jardin Restaurant, is the Polo Lounge. The lounge was renovated in 1974 and given a softer design with table lamps and flowers. It is fashioned in peachy pink with dark green booths, each featuring a plug-in phone. The photograph behind the bar depicts Will Rogers and Darryl F. Zanuck, two lounge regulars, playing polo. The menu offers a Neil McCarthy salad, named after the polo-playing millionaire. The hotel has its own bakery and herb garden, makes its own vinegar, and smokes meats. The chef in 2003 was Katsuo Sugiura. In 2007, one large suite was converted into the Bar Nineteen12. The fireplace in the hotel's lobby has a fire going every day of the year.

A new wing was added to the east side of the main building along Crescent Drive in the late 1940s. The "Crescent Wing", as it became known, features mature plantings on the balconies.

==== Rooms and bungalows ====
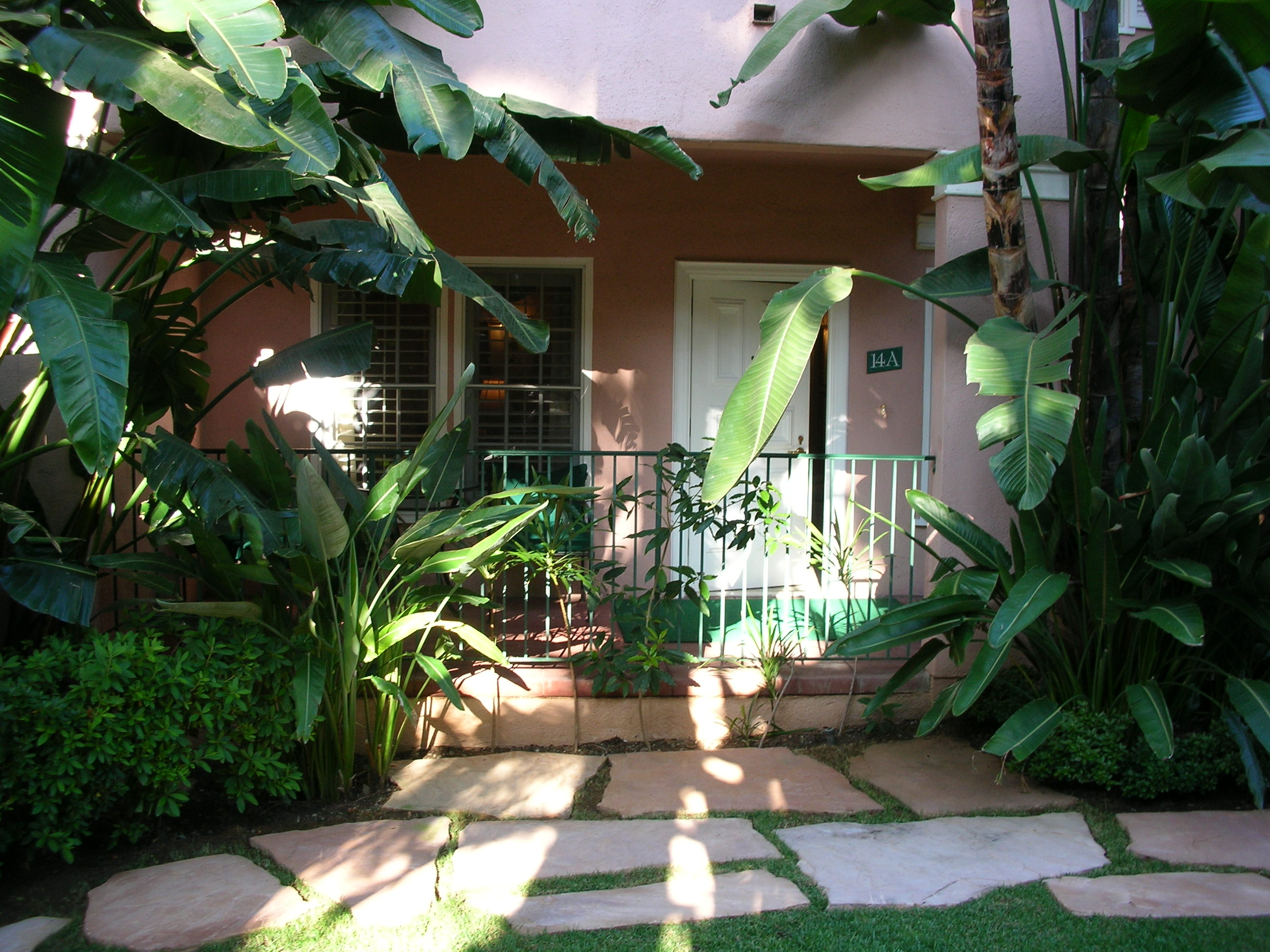
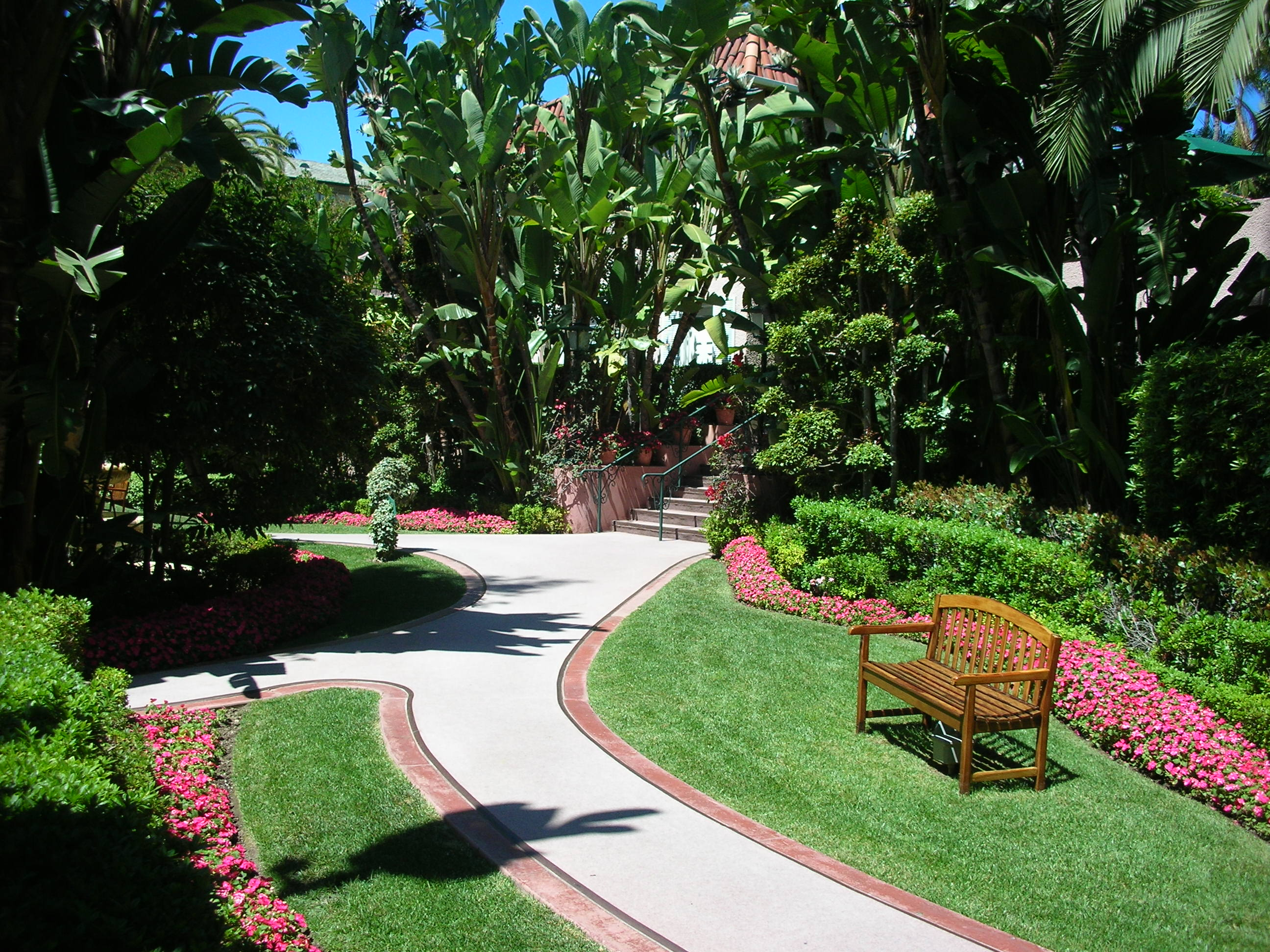
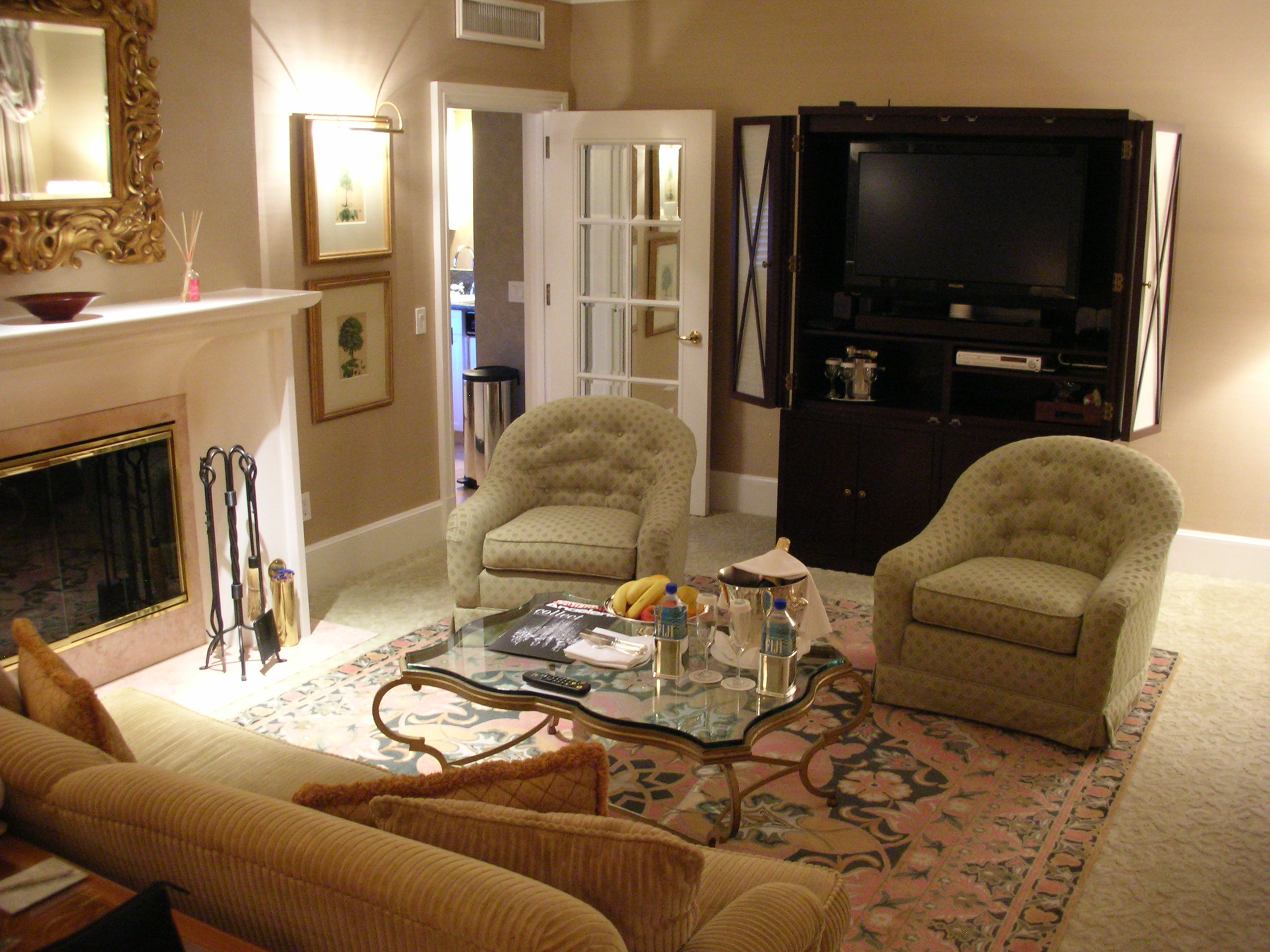
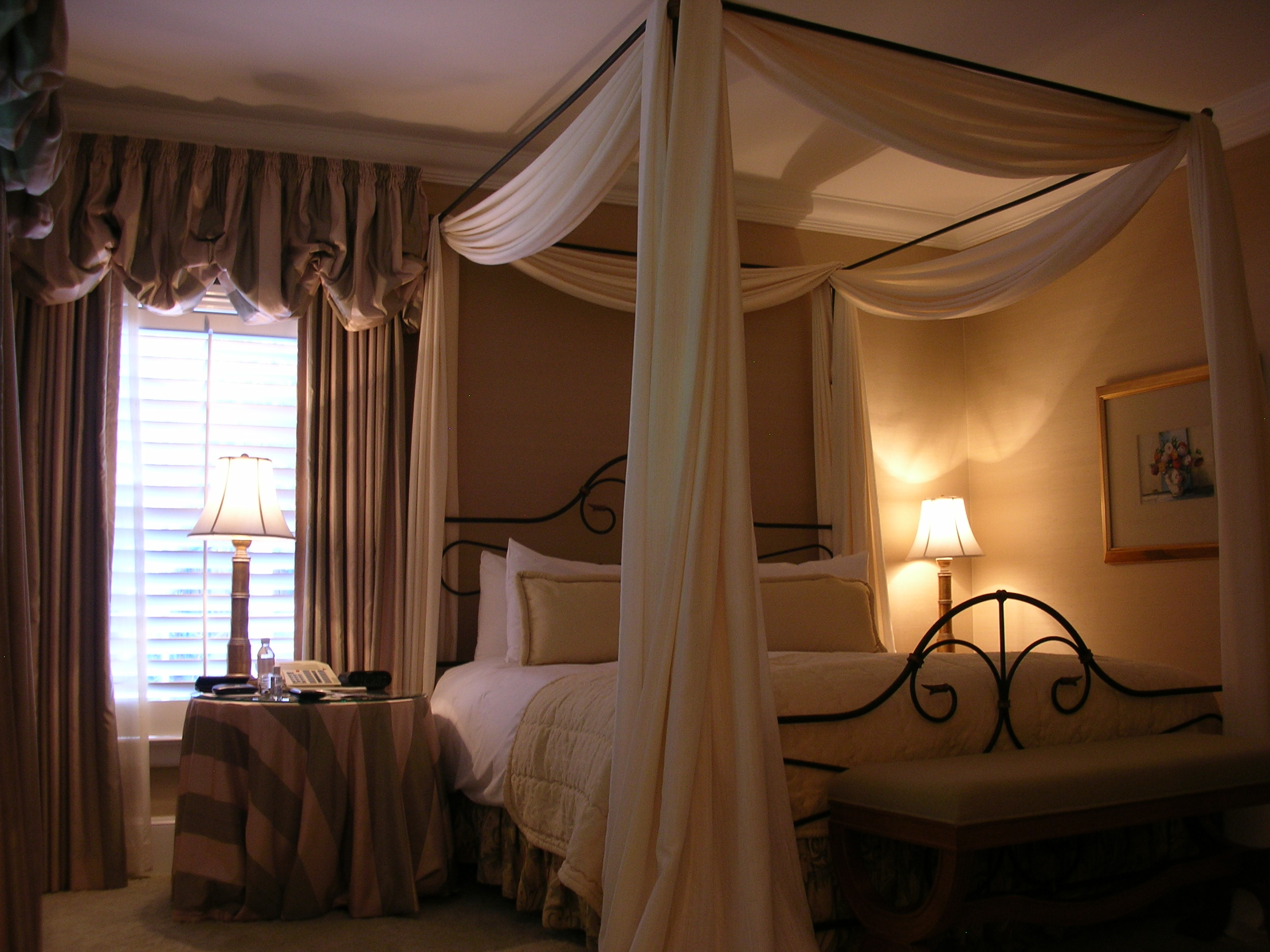
Bungalow 14 A : Top from left: Patio and view from bungalow, bottom from left: living room and bedroom

Many of the rooms have their own balcony and are designed in the Beverly Hills Hotel colors of peachy pinks, greens, apricots, and yellows. Several of the more expensive rooms have private patios, Jacuzzis, and their own kitchens.

Five bungalows were originally added to the gardens in 1915 to provide for families who could return each year with their own staff. As of 2015, the hotel has 23 bungalows set out across the gardens. Bungalows 14-21 are known as "Bachelor's Row", due to their association with film stars and their affairs, including Warren Beatty and Orson Welles. In 1990, a private pool and Jacuzzi were added to Bungalow No. 5 to accommodate businessman Walter Annenberg. No. 5 had been a favorite of Elizabeth Taylor and Richard Burton, who had "a standing room service order for two bottles of vodka at breakfast, and two more at lunch". Taylor also liked No. 3, where she stayed during her marriage to Eddie Fisher. Marilyn Monroe favored No. 1 and No. 7. No. 1, the most secluded of the bungalows, features an interior described by CNN as "creamy, lush and traditional, decorated in the manner of one's wealthy grandparents". No. 7 has become known as "the "Norma Jean". Dietrich ordered a 7 feet (2.1 m) by 8 feet (2.4 m) bed added to No. 10, the bungalow where John Lennon and Yoko Ono stayed in the 1970s. No. 22 was favored by Frank Sinatra and later by Donald Trump. In 2011, two Presidential Bungalows were established, replacing the tennis courts, with each containing three bedrooms and a private swimming pool and shower. As of 2018, a one-night stay at a bungalow may cost as much as $10,000.

In mid-1995, the hotel opened a dedicated $500,000 kosher kitchen below the Polo Lounge; by 1998, the hotel reported that about 40 percent of its events were kosher.

Howard Hughes permanently kept a bungalow at the hotel, but it was a secret whether he was on the premises or not. Often, the only person who knew Hughes was at the Beverly Hills Hotel was the hotel's chef. Hughes would awaken him in the middle of the night to prepare food for him. It has been alleged that several of the bungalows are haunted. Guests have reported hearing what is believed to be Harpo Marx playing the harp and seeing an apparition of Sergei Rachmaninoff.

== Gallery of historic images ==
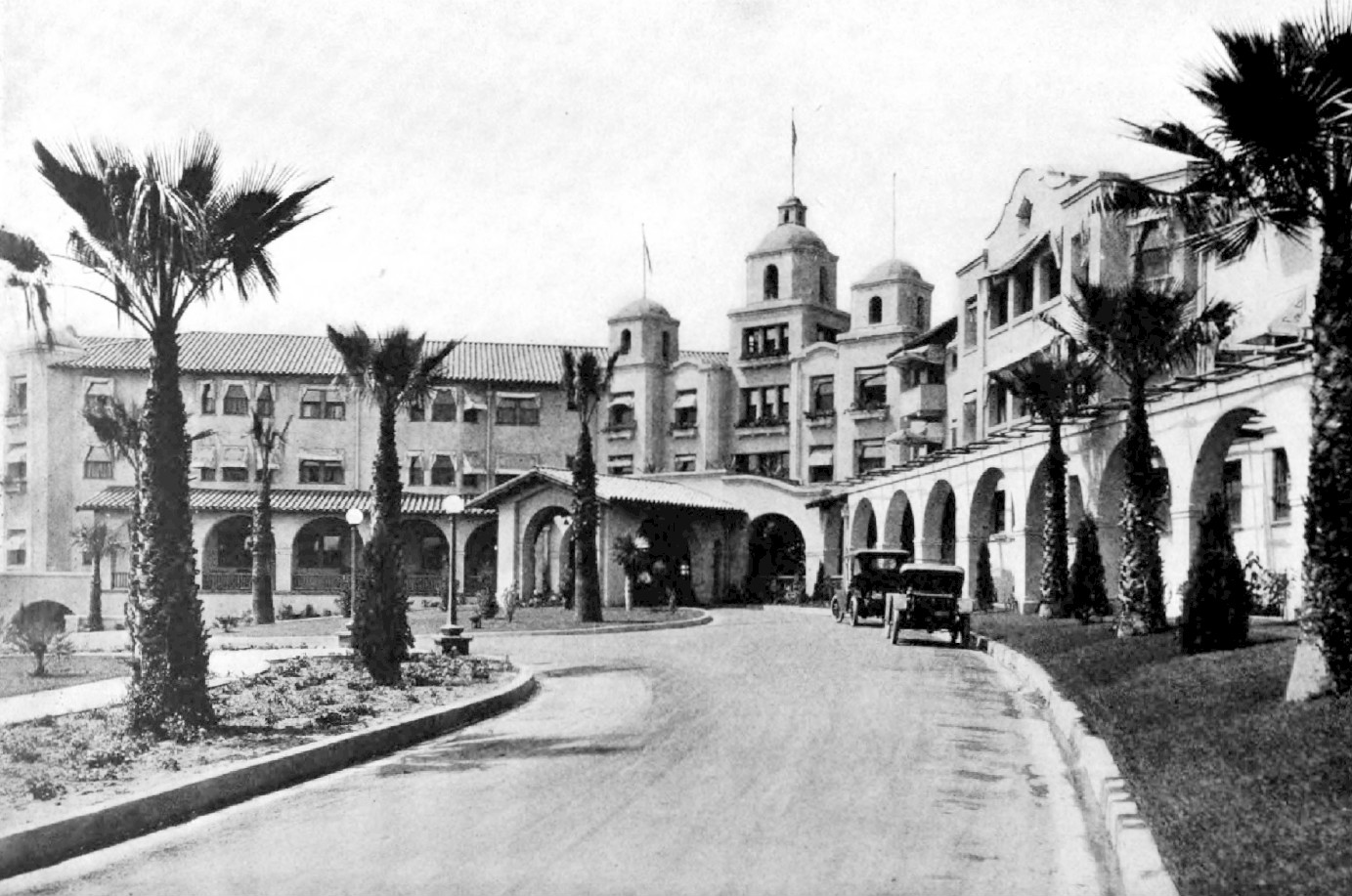
Entrance

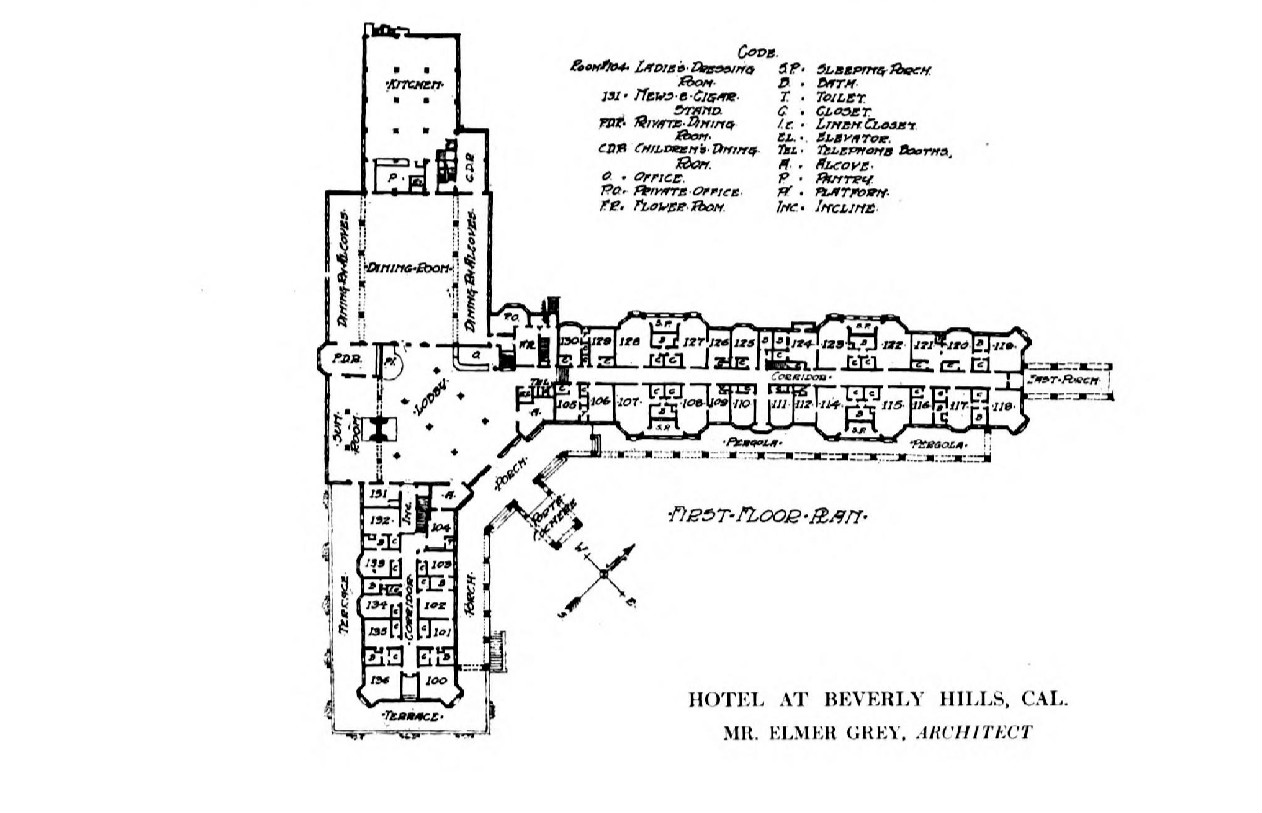
Main floor plan

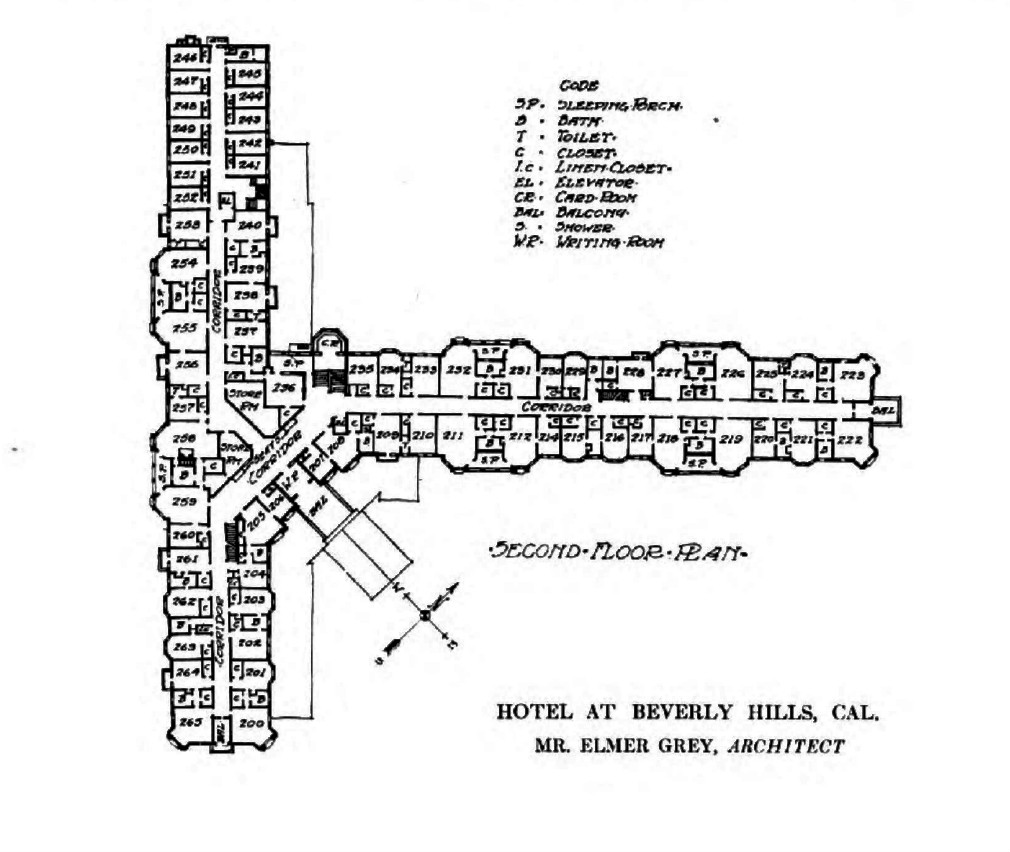
Upper floor plan

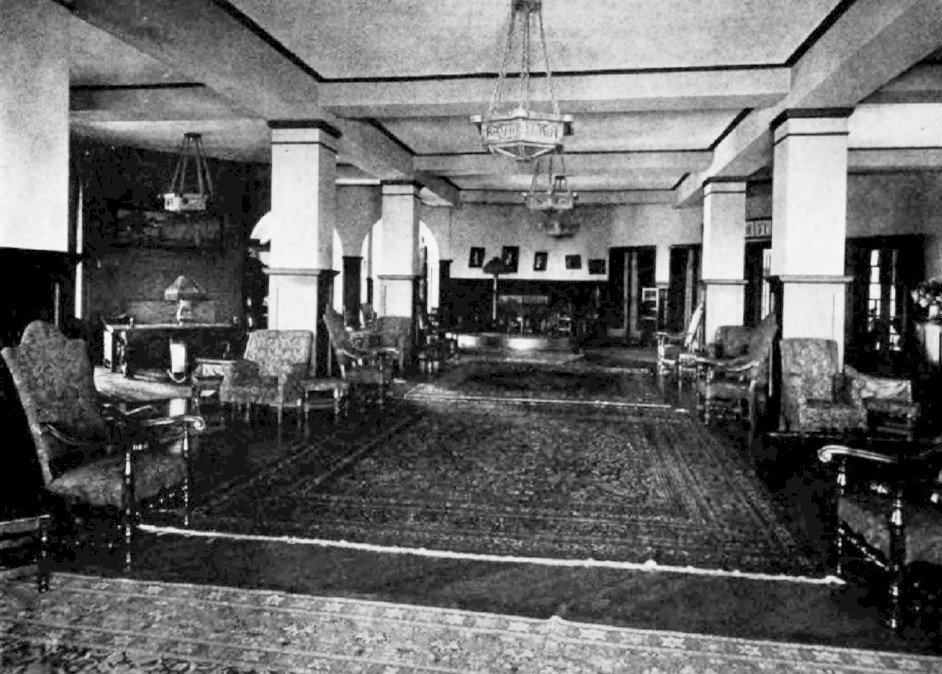
Lobby

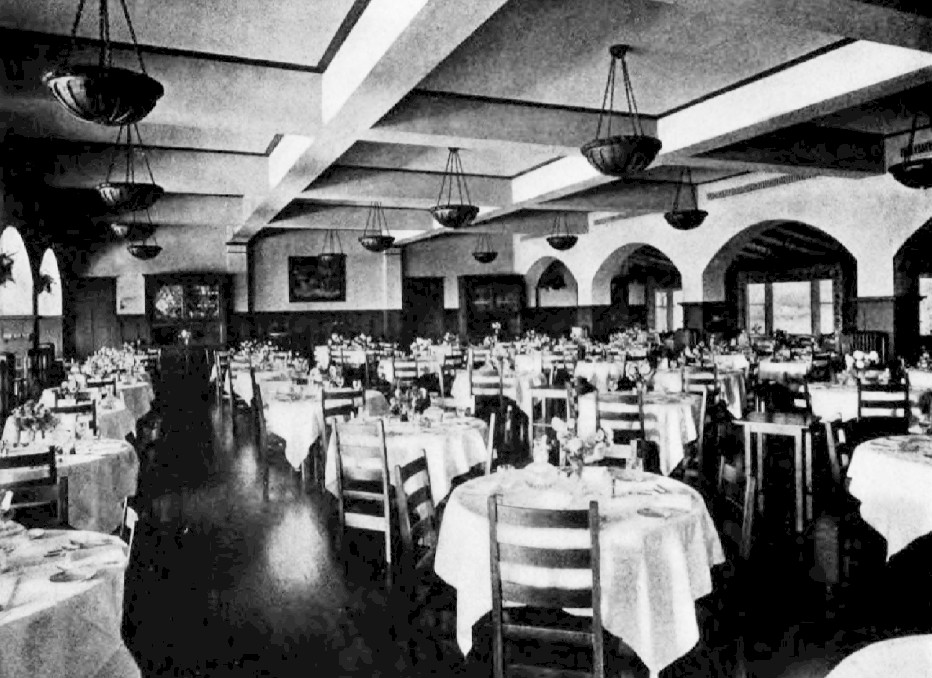
Dining room

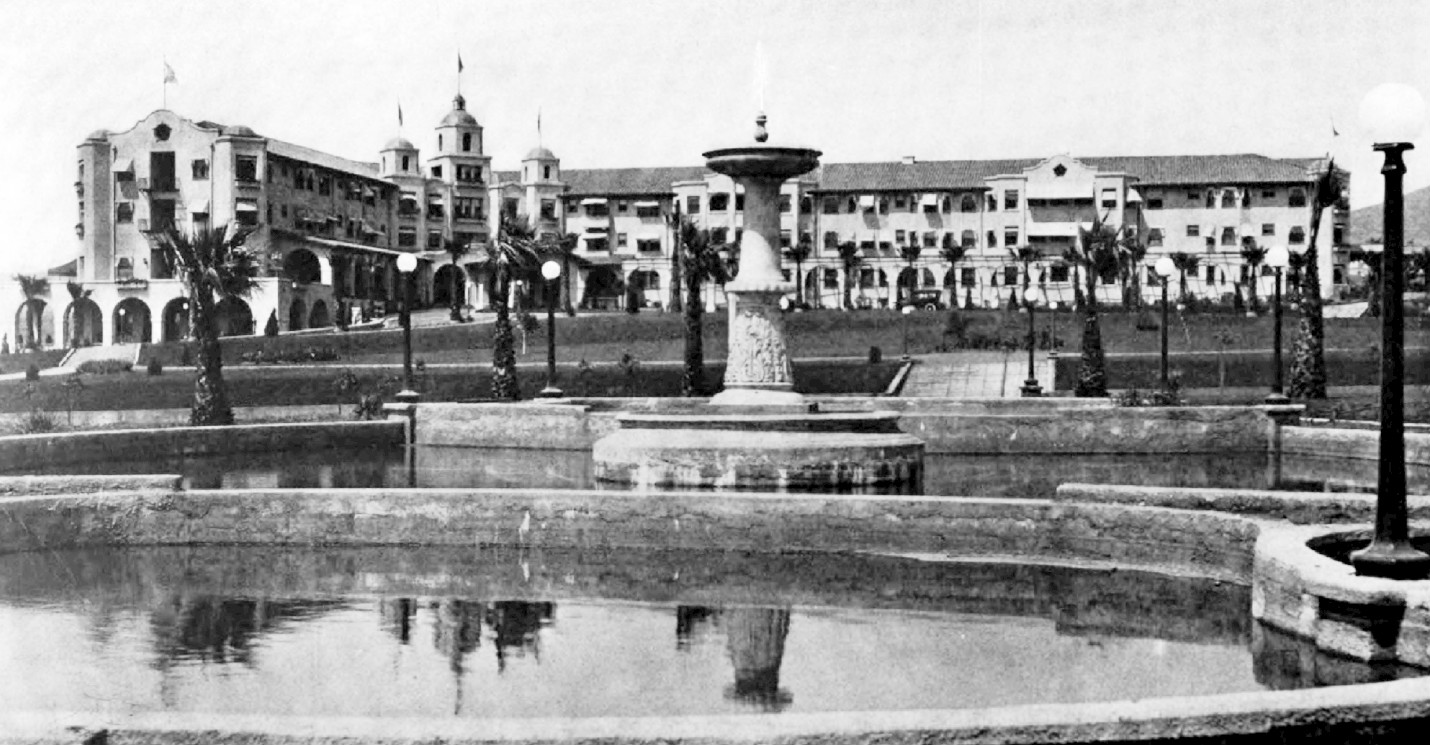
The hotel in 1913

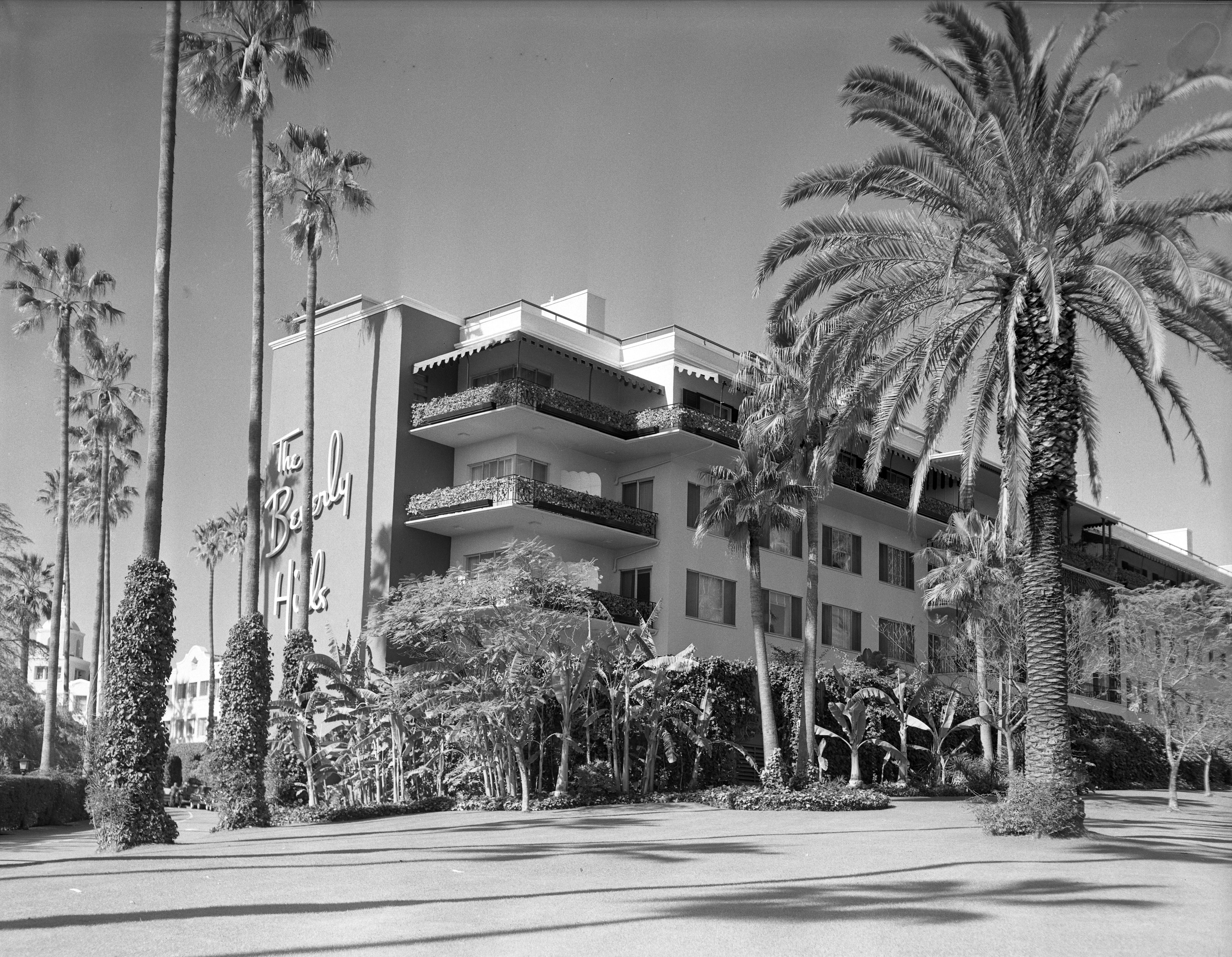
The hotel in 1959

== See also ==
- Dorchester Collection
- Hotel Bel-Air
- Van Noy Railway News and Hotel Company

== Sources ==
- Edwards, Nick; Hodgkins, Charles; Keeling, Stephen (May 1, 2014). The Rough Guide to California. Rough Guides Limited. ISBN 978-0-241-00764-8.
- Fleming, E. J. (January 1, 2000). Hollywood Death and Scandal Sites: Sixteen Driving Tours with Directions and the Full Story, from Tallulah Bankhead to River Phoenix. McFarland. ISBN 978-0-7864-0160-4.
- Lis, Tara de (September 15, 2011). Frommer's Los Angeles. John Wiley & Sons. ISBN 978-1-118-15620-9.
- Ochs, Michael (2014). 1000 Record Covers. Taschen. ISBN 978-3-8365-5058-1.
- Southall, Richard (February 1, 2013). Haunted Route 66. Llewellyn Worldwide. ISBN 978-0-7387-3164-3.
- Stuart, Sandra Lee (1978). The Pink Palace: Behind Closed Doors at the Beverly Hills Hotel. Secaucus, N.J: L. Stuart. ISBN 0-8184-0246-6.
- Wanamaker, Marc (2005). Early Beverly Hills. Arcadia Publishing. ISBN 978-0-7385-3068-0.
- Winter, Robert (September 1, 2009). An Arch Guidebook to Los Angeles. Gibbs Smith. ISBN 978-1-4236-0893-6.
