= Ben L. Silberstein =

American hotel owner (1902–1979)

Silberstein c. 1972

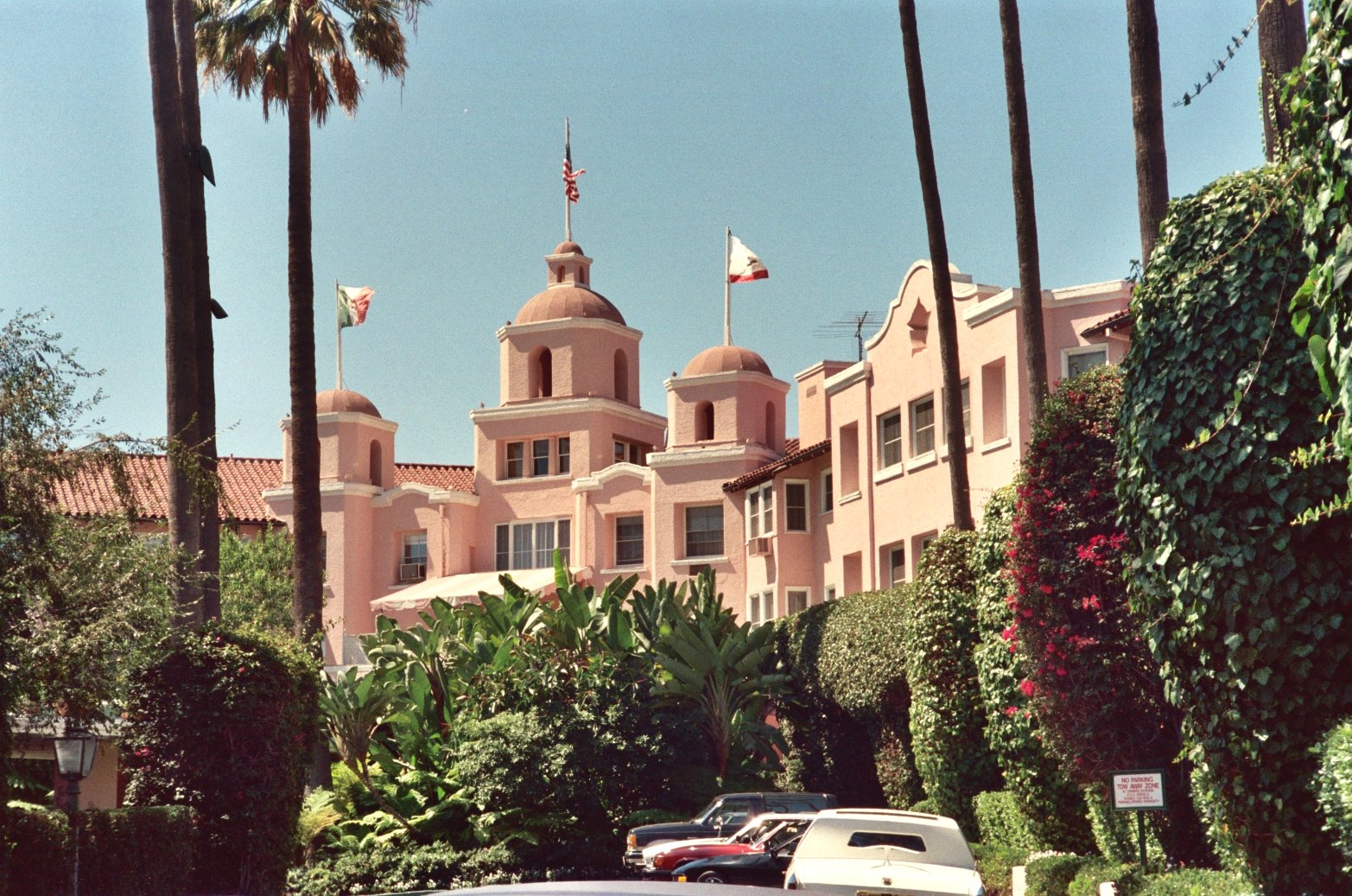
The Beverly Hills Hotel (1989)

Benjamin Laurence Silberstein (July 27, 1902 – December 19, 1979) was a Detroit real estate lawyer and subsequent hotelier in California, maintaining residences there and in Florida.

Silberstein had his degree from the Detroit College of Law but soon, with a brother, concentrated on deal making in real estate investment where he initially was successful specializing in properties for chain stores. He also acquired gear-work companies and in 1945 bought the National Bank Building in downtown Detroit. Having also had an early interest in hotel properties, he was intrigued by not being able to get in as a room guest at The Beverly Hills Hotel at first, and on a subsequent stay there in the early 1950s (at the request also of one of his teenage daughters) he began negotiating to buy that property in 1954. He closed the deal, against the advice of experts, in 1956 at five-and-a half million dollars and 80% ownership. By 1964 needed extensive investments, especially in the then 50-year-old main building, had also run into millions of dollars. Comprehensive guest-service adjustments to requirements on employees, and to amenities and benefits offered guests, adapted by the new resident owner, created and maintained the popularity and high occupancy rate which the expensive hotel enjoyed for decades. Silberstein was also involved in philanthropy.

The now-defunct Beverly Hills Hotel Corporation, which he chaired, additionally operated a chain of affordable motels, the Vagabond Inns.

Hernando Courtright, who had run the hotel in Beverly Hills before Silberstein's purchase, resigned in 1958 amid irreparable personal animosity between the two hotel men which continued as long as the latter lived. Courtright's wife at the time had divorced him and married Silberstein.

By acquaintances and employees alike, he was often considered volatile and controversial in his personal behavior but was also well-liked by many others for his strict intuitive policies and strong leadership, which led to his hotel being one of the best known and most profitable in the world.

Silberstein died of lymphoma in 1979. His grave is in West Palm Beach, Florida.

After Silberstein's death, ownership of the hotel became a matter of conflict between his two daughters and their husbands where the elder daughter's husband after decades of corporate presidency there was unseated by the younger's (Ivan Boesky) before the property was sold on to others.

In 2023 Wayne State University opened the Ben L. Silberstein Institute for Brain Health.
