= Ivan Boesky =

American stock trader (1937–2024)

- Born: Ivan Frederick Boesky; March 6, 1937; Detroit, Michigan, U.S.
- Died: May 20, 2024 (aged 87); La Jolla, California, U.S.
- Education: Michigan State University
- Occupation: Stock trader
- Known for: Insider trading scandal
- Spouse(s): Seema Silberstein (m. 1962; div. 1991) Ana Boesky
- Children: 5
- Criminal information
- Status: Released
- Conviction: Insider trading (1986)
- Penalty: 3.5 years incarceration, $100 million fine, prohibition on future work with securities

Details
- Imprisoned at: Federal Correctional Institution, Lompoc (1987–1990)

Ivan Frederick Boesky (/ˈboʊski/; March 6, 1937 – May 20, 2024) was a convicted criminal and an American stock trader who was infamous for his prominent role in an insider trading scandal in the mid-1980s. After getting caught he became a government informant and then pleaded guilty, and was fined a record $100 million, and served twenty months in prison.

== Early life and education ==
Boesky was born to a Jewish family in Detroit. His family owned several delicatessens and taverns in the city. He attended the Cranbrook School in Bloomfield Hills before graduating from Detroit's Mumford High School. He then attended courses at Wayne State University in Detroit, Eastern Michigan University in Ypsilanti, and the University of Michigan in Ann Arbor. Although he lacked an undergraduate degree, he was admitted to Detroit College of Law (now Michigan State University College of Law) and graduated in 1965. In the 1980s, Boesky served as an adjunct professor at Columbia University's Graduate School of Business and at New York University's Graduate School of Business.

== Career ==
In 1966, Boesky and his wife moved to New York where he worked for several stock brokerage companies including L.F. Rothschild and Edwards & Hanly. In 1975, he initiated his own stock brokerage company, Ivan F. Boesky & Company, with $700,000 (equivalent to $4.2 million in 2025) worth of start-up money from his wife's family with a business plan that speculated on corporate takeovers. The company grew from profits as well as buy-in investments from new partnerships. By 1986, he had become an arbitrageur who had amassed a fortune of more than US$200 million by betting on corporate takeovers and the $136 million in proceeds from the sale of the Beverly Hills Hotel.

In 1986, Boesky entered an agreement with the United States Attorney's office for the Southern District of New York, agreeing to plead guilty to one count of conspiracy to commit violations of the federal securities laws. He used inside information provided by Robert Wilkis and Ira Sokolow, two investment bankers, and purchased securities for entities with which he was affiliated. The inside information typically involved tender offers, mergers or other possible business combinations, for companies such as Nabisco Brands, Inc., R.J. Reynolds, and Houston Natural Gas Corp. Time magazine ran a December 1, 1986, cover story about his "scam," dubbing him "Ivan the Terrible."

Although insider trading of this kind was illegal, laws prohibiting it were rarely enforced until Boesky was prosecuted. He cooperated with the SEC and informed on others, including the case against financier Michael Milken and, per a plea bargain, received a prison sentence of 3 1/2 years and was fined US$100 million. Although he was released after serving only 20 months, he was permanently prohibited from working with securities. He served his sentence at Lompoc Federal Prison Camp near Vandenberg Air Force Base in California.

Boesky, unable to rehabilitate his reputation after being released from prison, paid hundreds of millions of dollars as fines and compensation for his Guinness share-trading fraud role and a number of separate insider-dealing scams. Later he began practicing Judaism, attended classes at Jewish Theological Seminary of America, and donated money to the seminary. In 1987, after the financial scandal fallout, he asked that his name be removed from the Jewish Theological Seminary Library.

== Personal life ==
In 1962, Boesky married Seema Silberstein, the younger daughter of Detroit real estate magnate Ben L. Silberstein whose holdings included The Beverly Hills Hotel in California. After her father's death, they won a court battle against her sister and brother-in-law over the hotel's ownership.

In 1991, she divorced Boesky and agreed to pay him $23 million and $180,000 a year for life. They had four children. Ivan Boesky and his second wife, Ana, had another child. They lived in La Jolla, California, until his death on May 20, 2024 at the age of 87.

Boesky smoked Marlboro cigarettes.

== In popular culture ==
The character of Gordon Gekko in the movie Wall Street (1987) is based in part on Boesky, particularly his "greed is good" speech which resembled the commencement speech Boesky delivered in May 1986 at the Haas School of Business at the University of California, Berkeley: "I think greed is healthy. You can be greedy and still feel good about yourself."

Boesky was featured in a CNBC documentary titled Empires of New York.

Boesky was also featured in Titans The Rise of Wall Street on Amazon Prime.
