= Irving Link =

Real estate investor

Irving V. Link
- Born: 1906; New York City, US
- Died: December 31, 2007 (aged 101); Los Angeles, California, US
- Occupation: Real estate investor
- Known for: Longtime patron of the Beverly Hills Hotel

Irving V. Link (1906 – December 31, 2007) was an American real estate investor and a notable presence at Beverly Hills Hotel, where he visited daily for over four decades.

== Early life ==
Irving Link was born on the Lower East Side of New York City, the ninth child of a respected rabbi. Unlike his siblings, who were born in Vienna, he was the only member of his family born in the United States. His father, a Talmudic scholar with a fondness for card games, died when Link was twenty years old.

In 1933, at the age of twenty-seven, Link married Nan Ofgang in Brooklyn. Struggling financially, he borrowed ten dollars to pay the rabbi. With limited resources but a strong entrepreneurial spirit, he discovered a warehouse in New York containing a surplus of unsold fortune-telling devices called Fortunscopes. Seizing the opportunity, he and his wife traveled across the country selling them to retailers, often sleeping in train day coaches due to financial constraints."Paradise Lost". The New Yorker. February 22, 1993.

Their journey took them to cities across America, from Philadelphia to Seattle. Along the way, Link developed an appreciation for fine clothing, purchasing his first set of Palm Beach suits in the Carolinas. Eventually, the couple settled in California, where Link used his earnings to enter the dress business. Though they briefly considered relocating back East, a coin toss decided their fate—California became their permanent home.

By 1949, they had purchased a modest house in Beverly Hills. An early morning walk led Link to breakfast at the Polo Lounge of the Beverly Hills Hotel. That visit marked the beginning of his decades-long connection with the hotel.

== Beverly Hills Hotel patronage ==
In 1950, Link began frequenting the Beverly Hills Hotel. For 42 years, he spent his days by the hotel's pool, engaging in activities such as sunbathing and playing gin rummy. His consistent presence made him a well-known figure among the hotel's staff and guests.

== Later years and death ==
Link continued his daily visits to the Beverly Hills Hotel until it closed for renovations in 1992. He died on December 31, 2007, at the age of 101, in Los Angeles.

== In popular culture ==
Link's dedication to the Beverly Hills Hotel was highlighted in a 1993 New Yorker article titled "Beverly Hills Hotel: Paradise Lost," which detailed his daily routine and the impact of the hotel's closure on its regular patrons.
