= Polo Lounge =

Restaurant and bar at the Beverly Hills Hotel

Coordinates: 34.0818°N 118.4134°W

The Polo Lounge is a storied restaurant and bar located inside the Beverly Hills Hotel at 9641 Sunset Boulevard, Beverly Hills, California.

Bartender at Polo Lounge

== Overview ==
The lounge has been described as "done up in peachy pink (as you might expect), with deep carpets and dark green booths, each booth featuring a plug-in phone. Legend has it that Mia Farrow (and maybe even Marlene Dietrich) was banned from the Polo Lounge for wearing pants."

Hernando Courtright, who ran The Beverly Hills Hotel in the 1930s and '40s, had a friend named Charles Wrightsman, who led a national champion polo team. Wrightsman felt it unseemly to keep the team trophy, a silver bowl, in his own home. Courtright, on hearing of his friend's dilemma, offered to display the bowl in the hotel's bar, which was being redecorated at the time. The name for the bar and its lounge sprang from that favor.

The Polo Lounge was seen as the premier power dining spot in all of Los Angeles. There are three dining areas complete with the signature pink and green motif. The photograph behind the bar depicts Will Rogers and Darryl F. Zanuck, two lounge regulars, playing polo. The menu "still offers a classic Neil McCarthy salad, named after the polo-playing millionaire."

== Historical impact ==
Both the lounge and the hotel play a small yet significant role in the history of the Watergate political affair in 1972. The high command of the Committee to Re-Elect the President (Richard Nixon) in 1972 (Note: The meeting at the Polo Lounge in the Beverly Hill Hotel included John Mitchell, Jeb Magruder, Robert Mardian, Frederick LaRue, and Herbert Porter.) was staying at the hotel during a West Coast fundraising trip, and having a breakfast meeting in the Polo Lounge when Watergate burglar G. Gordon Liddy placed his fateful call to Committee Deputy Director, Jeb Stuart Magruder at about 12:30 pm on June 17, 1972. Magruder took the call at his table in the Lounge and was told by Liddy that Jim McCord who was the committee's "security chief was arrested in the Democratic headquarters in the Watergate last night" (Note: The June 16, 1972, Watergate beak-in, which occurred during the E. Howard Hunt headed and Liddy supported Operation Gemstone by The Plumbers also called the Room 16 Project, ODESSA, which worked for a secret organization named the Special Investigations Unit (SIU), was conducted to replace the malfunctioning "bugs" that had been placed on May 28, 1972, as two surveillance devices, or phone taps, on the telephones lines of both Larry O'Brien, who was the chairman of the Democratic Party, and Spencer Oliver, who was a high-ranking official in the Democratic Party.) and when Liddy realized that Magruder was obviously in a public setting he initially insisted that he (Magruder) travel to the Los Angeles Air Force Base at El Segundo in the Los Angeles area to reach a private setting and a secure telephone line.

In the event, McGruder merely left the lounge and went to one of the hotel’s pay phone stations and called Liddy back. Once fully briefed, Magruder went to one of the hotel’s famous suites and participated in a meeting with Committee Director and U.S. Attorney General John Mitchell, his special assistant Fred LaRue, and Committee Deputy Robert Mardian.

The hotel's logged and charged long-distance-call records of the calls made from that suite, on the morning after the burglary, formed the basis of the evidence which convicted each of the participants of conspiracy and obstruction of justice in January 1975. (Note: The Plumbers also called the Room 16 Project, ODESSA, worked for the a secret organization named the Special Investigations Unit (SIU), which received its funding from the Committee to Reelect the President (CRP) and had as its purpose both to spy on persons that Nixon did not trust and to attempt to disrupt and sabotage rival politicians' campaigns, and both Jim McCord and Howard Hunt, who was the top Plumber, were "consultants" with Liddy, who was Hunt's top assistant, serving as a "legal adviser" to the Committee to Re-Elect the President (CRP).)

== Movies filmed at the Polo Lounge ==
- The Bad and the Beautiful (1952)
- The Harder They Fall (1956)
- Designing Woman (1957)
- The Way We Were (1973)
- Shampoo (1975)
- California Suite (1978)
- American Gigolo (1980)
- Hannah and Her Sisters (1986)
- Beverly Hills Cop II (1987)
- B*A*P*S (1997)
- Fear and Loathing in Las Vegas (1998)
- Anywhere but Here (1999)
- The Kid Stays in the Picture (2002)
- Rules Don't Apply (2016)
