= Hernando Courtright =

American businessman

Hernando William de Vos Courtright
- Born: July 10, 1904; Coeur d'Alene, Idaho, U.S.
- Died: January 22, 1986 (aged 81); Beverly Hills, California, U.S.
- Education: University of California at Berkeley; University of Southern California
- Occupation: Hotelier
- Known for: The Beverly Hills Hotel; The Beverly Wilshire Hotel
- Spouse: Marcella Eva Cuillery Courtright (m. 1955) Florence Falzone Courtright (m. 1977)

Hernando Courtright (1904–1986) was an American businessman best known as a hotelier. At different points, he was the proprietor of the Beverly Hills Hotel and The Beverly Wilshire Hotel.

He attended University of California, Berkeley and USC School of Business.

Courtright was president of National Pacific Tank and Mill Co. in Oakland and became one of the youngest vice presidents for the Bank of America in San Francisco during the 1930s, and when the Beverly Hills Hotel went into bankruptcy, he was assigned to the foreclosure in 1936. Having been a banker managing the foreclosed Beverly Hills Hotel, he formed a real estate investment group and personally managed the property. Under his management, it became among the best-known and admired American hotels.

Courtright was credited with naming the Polo Lounge, having been inspired during renovations to the Beverly Hills Hotel bar, displaying a trophy won by a friend who led a national champion polo team.

In 1958, Courtright sold the Beverly Hills Hotel to Ben L. Silberstein and associates for $6 million. In the deal, the plan was for Courtright, who knew the social groups of Los Angeles and other owners at the time, to stay on for five years as president and general manager.

He left to become an executive at Zeckendorf Hotels to develop part of the 20th Century Fox lot but moved on to buy the Beverly Wilshire Hotel and turned it into a rival to the Beverly Hills Hotel.

He sold the Beverly Wilshire Hotel in November 1985 to a Hong Kong investment group for $125 million.

He was married to Marcella Eva Cuillery and later to Florence Falzone and had six children.

His cousin was actor Leo Carrillo.
