= Margaret J. Anderson =

American hotel owner, businesswomen, and socialite

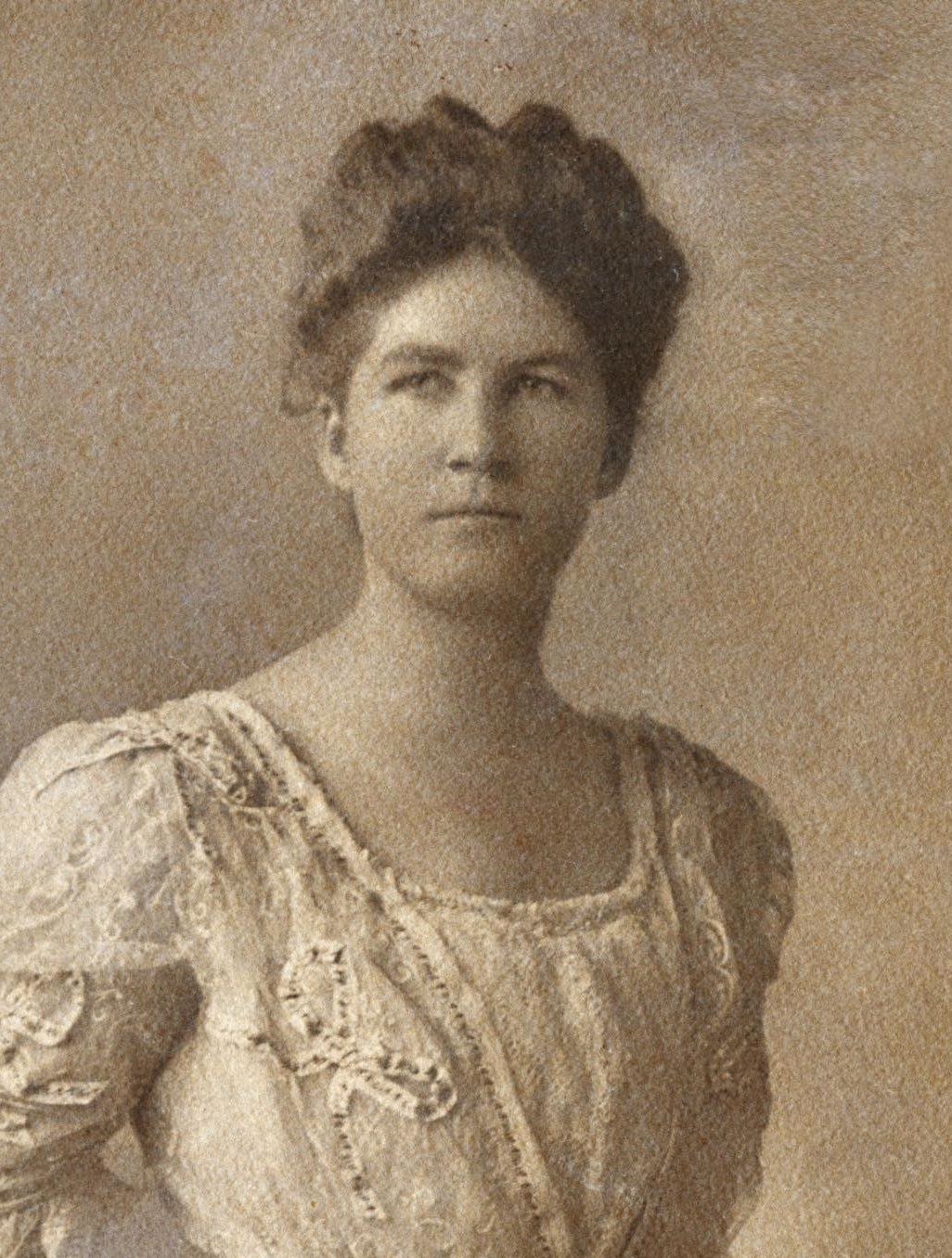
Anderson, c. 1890s

Margaret Jane Anderson (née Boag; May 15, 1859 – September 24, 1930) was an American hotelier and socialite who was the owner and developer of The Beverly Hills Hotel and the Hollywood Hotel in Los Angeles County, California.

== Biography ==
Margaret Jane Boag was born May 15, 1859 in Cedar, Mahaska County, Iowa to Rev Robert Boag and Christina Johnston Boag and moved with her family to California in 1874. She was of Scots-Irish parentage. On 5 December 1889 at Alhambra, California, she married Louis C. Anderson, who was 19 years her senior. Anderson maintained one of the early orange orchards of southern California at a ranch near Alhambra. Some accounts indicate he died, leaving Margaret a widow with two young children. However, other information is that he remarried eight years after he and Margaret married.

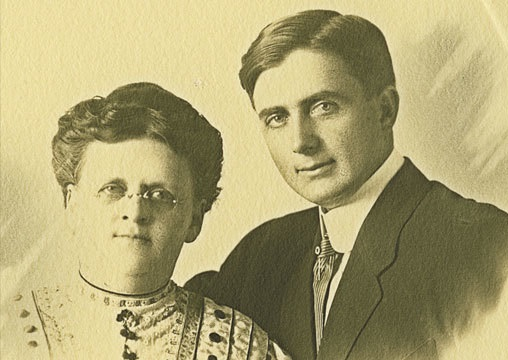
Anderson with her son Stanley, c. 1910

By 1903, Margaret and her son Stanley were managing the Hotel Hollywood for Almira Parker Hershey. Hershey and Anderson had a long history; both were Iowans and Anderson had begun her career working at Hershey's other hotels like the Darby and the Fremont. Despite the growth the hotel experienced under Anderson's management—expanding from 16 rooms to 250 and becoming one of the most known hotels in the area — the relationship between owner and manager was contentious. In 1909, it deteriorated to the point that lawsuits were filed. Hershey claimed that Anderson had failed to remit rents due on her management of the hotel and Anderson counter-claimed that Hershey failed to pay rent on the suites she was living in. The suits dragged through the courts for over two years. The public dispute led the Rodeo Land and Water Company to make an offer to Anderson for ownership of her own hotel. The company wanted a flagship to spur development and Anderson wanted ownership of the land, which she had been unable to secure from Hershey.

In 1911, plans were announced for the erection of the hotel by Anderson and her son, Stanley, at a cost of $500,000. Upon completion, Anderson staged a victory over Hershey when she announced to guests at the Hollywood Hotel that it was closed until new management was hired, as she had resigned. She offered jobs to all the staff and rooms at the soon-to-be opened Beverly Hills Hotel to the guests. The guests and staff relocated and the Beverly Hills Hotel opened on 30 April 1912. With an eye for perfection and the business acumen which had led to growth at the Hollywood Hotel, Anderson began marketing to Hollywood and by 1914, had secured the patronage of Douglas Fairbanks and Mary Pickford, the "it" couple of their era. The hotel became the celebrity playhouse of choice, and known for not only its indulgence of clients but its strict policy of guarding guests' privacy. In 1928, Anderson sold the hotel and retired.
