= Neil S. McCarthy =

American lawyer and racehorse breeder

- Born: May 6, 1888; Phoenix, Arizona, US
- Died: July 25, 1972 (aged 84); Los Angeles, California, US
- Education: University of Michigan
- Occupations: Lawyer, racehorse owner-breeder
- Spouse(s): 1) Marguerite Gilbert; 2) Mary Beich Myers
- Children: 4
- Honors: The Neil McCarthy salad at the Polo Lounge; The Neil McCarthy salad at The Blvd restaurant

Neil Steere McCarthy (May 6, 1888 – July 25, 1972) was an American corporate and film industry lawyer, and a Thoroughbred racehorse owner-breeder.

== Biography ==
A third-generation Los Angeles native, he graduated from the University of Michigan with a degree in law. For about seventeen years, McCarthy was associated with businessman Howard Hughes as his attorney and was a vice president in the Hughes organization during World War II. McCarthy set up practice in Los Angeles where he rose to fame as an attorney for many in the film industry. Among his clients were Paramount Pictures and well-known personalities such as producer Cecil B. DeMille, MGM Studios boss Louis B. Mayer, and actors Ginger Rogers, Joan Bennett, Betsey Cushing Roosevelt, Joan Crawford, Lana Turner, and Ava Gardner.

Neil McCarthy and his wife Marguerite had four children. A daughter, Marjorie, married Dennis J. Gless and were the parents of actress Sharon Gless. She sought her grandfather's advice and he told her: "It's a filthy business. You stay out of it" but a few years later when she spoke to him again about acting, he encouraged her, and gave her money for acting classes. Another daughter, Rosemary, married Dr. John A. E. Bullis. In 1975, Rosemary Bullis was awarded a Silver Cup for Outstanding Achievement by the Los Angeles Times as one of its ten "Women of the Year." In 1966 Marguerite McCarthy died and in 1969 Neil McCarthy remarried artist Mary Beich Myers.

== A Polo player and his salad ==
A polo player, Neil McCarthy was a member of the Midwick Country Club and captain of its polo team.

The Neil McCarthy salad, named in his honor, remains a signature dish tossed tableside at the Polo Lounge in Beverly Hills. The Blvd. restaurant at the Beverly Wilshire Hotel also serves a Neil McCarthy tossed salad.

== Thoroughbred racing ==
In addition to a home in Beverly Hills, McCarthy owned a horse ranch in Hidden Valley. His involvement with horses extended to California Thoroughbred horse racing, both as an owner and as a breeder. In January 1948, he purchased the great Australian runner, Shannon. The horse won a number of important races for him in California, including the prestigious Hollywood Gold Cup. Shannon would be voted a share of 1948 American Champion Older Male Horse honors. After retiring him from racing, McCarthy sold the horse to a breeding syndicate headed by Leslie Combs II of Lexington, Kentucky, but kept a share of the breeding rights for himself.

Among his other racing successes, McCarthy won the 1959 Bing Crosby and Palos Verdes Handicaps, plus the San Vicente Stakes with Ole Fols, a horse he purchased in Ireland. In 1962, his colt Royal Attack won California's most important race for three-year-olds, the Santa Anita Derby.

Following a stroke, 84-year-old McCarthy died on July 25, 1972, in Good Samaritan Hospital in Los Angeles.
