= History of West Africa =

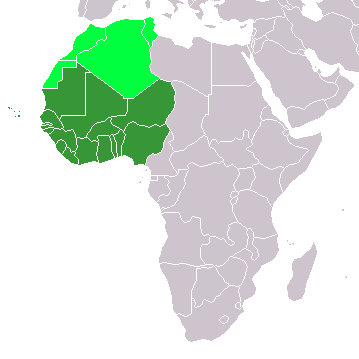
A map of Africa, showing what is considered politically as West Africa, and other countries not considered politically as Western Africa, but geographically part of West Africa.

The history of West Africa has been divided into its prehistory, the Iron Age in Africa, the period of major polities flourishing, the colonial period, and finally the post-independence era, in which the current nations were formed. West Africa is west of an imagined north–south axis lying close to 10° east longitude, bordered by the Atlantic Ocean and Sahara Desert. Colonial boundaries are reflected in the modern boundaries between contemporary West African states, cutting across ethnic and cultural lines, often dividing single ethnic groups between two or more states.

West African populations were considerably mobile and interacted with one another throughout the population history of West Africa. Acheulean tool-using archaic humans may have dwelled throughout West Africa since at least between 780,000 BP and 126,000 BP (Middle Pleistocene). During the Pleistocene, Middle Stone Age peoples (e.g., Iwo Eleru people, possibly Aterians), who dwelled throughout West Africa between MIS 4 and MIS 2, were gradually replaced by incoming Late Stone Age peoples, who migrated into West Africa as an increase in humid conditions resulted in the subsequent expansion of the West African forest. West African hunter-gatherers occupied western Central Africa (e.g., Shum Laka) earlier than 32,000 BP, dwelled throughout coastal West Africa by 12,000 BP, migrated northward between 12,000 BP and 8000 BP as far as Mali, Burkina Faso, and Mauritania, and persisted as late as 1000 BP or some period of time after 1500 CE.

After the Kel Essuf Period, Round Head Period, and Pastoral Period of the Central Sahara, sedentary farming developed in West Africa among the ancestors of modern West Africans. The Iron industry, in both smelting and forging for tools and weapons, emerged in West Africa as early as 2631 BCE, and by 400 BCE, contact had been made with the Mediterranean civilizations, and a regular trade included exporting gold, cotton, metal, and leather in exchange for copper, horses, salt, textiles, beads, and slaves. The Tichitt culture developed in 2200 BCE and lasted until around 200 BCE. The Nok culture developed in 1500 BCE and vanished under unknown circumstances around 500 CE.

Serer people constructed the Senegambian stone circles between 3rd century BCE and 16th century CE. The Sahelian kingdoms were a series of kingdoms or empires that were built on the Sahel, the area of grasslands south of the Sahara. They controlled the trade routes across the desert, and were also quite decentralised, with member cities having a great deal of autonomy. The Ghana Empire may have been established as early as the 3rd century CE. It was succeeded by the Sosso in 1230, the Mali Empire in the 13th century CE, and later by the Songhai and Sokoto Caliphate. There were also a number of forest empires and states in this time period.

Following the collapse of the Songhai Empire, a number of smaller states arose across West Africa, including the Bambara Empire of Ségou, the lesser Bambara kingdom of Kaarta, the Fula/Malinké kingdom of Khasso (in present-day Mali's Kayes Region), and the Kénédougou Empire of Sikasso. European traders first became a force in the region in the 15th century. The Atlantic slave trade began, with the Portuguese taking hundreds of captives back to their country for use as slaves; this began on a grand scale after Christopher Columbus's voyage to the Americas and the subsequent demand for cheap colonial labour. As the demand for slaves increased, some African rulers sought to supply the demand by constant war against their neighbours, resulting in fresh captives. European, American and Haitian governments passed legislation prohibiting the Atlantic slave trade in the 19th century, though the last country to abolish the institution was Brazil in 1888.

In 1725, the cattle-herding Fulanis of Fouta Djallon launched the first major reformist jihad of the region, overthrowing the local animist, Mande-speaking elites and attempting to somewhat democratize their society. At the same time, the Europeans started to travel into the interior of Africa to trade and explore. Mungo Park (1771–1806) made the first serious expedition into the region's interior, tracing the Niger River as far as Timbuktu. French armies followed not long after. In the Scramble for Africa in the 1880s the Europeans started to colonise the inland of West Africa, they had previously mostly controlled trading ports along the coasts and rivers.

Following World War II, campaigns for independence sprung up across West Africa, most notably in Ghana under the Pan-Africanist Kwame Nkrumah (1909–1972). After a decade of protests, riots and clashes, French West Africa voted for autonomy in a 1958 referendum, dividing into the states of today; most of the British colonies gained autonomy the following decade. Since independence, West Africa has suffered from the same problems as much of the African continent, particularly dictatorships, political corruption and military coups; it has also seen civil wars. The development of oil and mineral wealth has seen the steady modernization of some countries since the early 2000s, though inequality persists.

== Geography ==
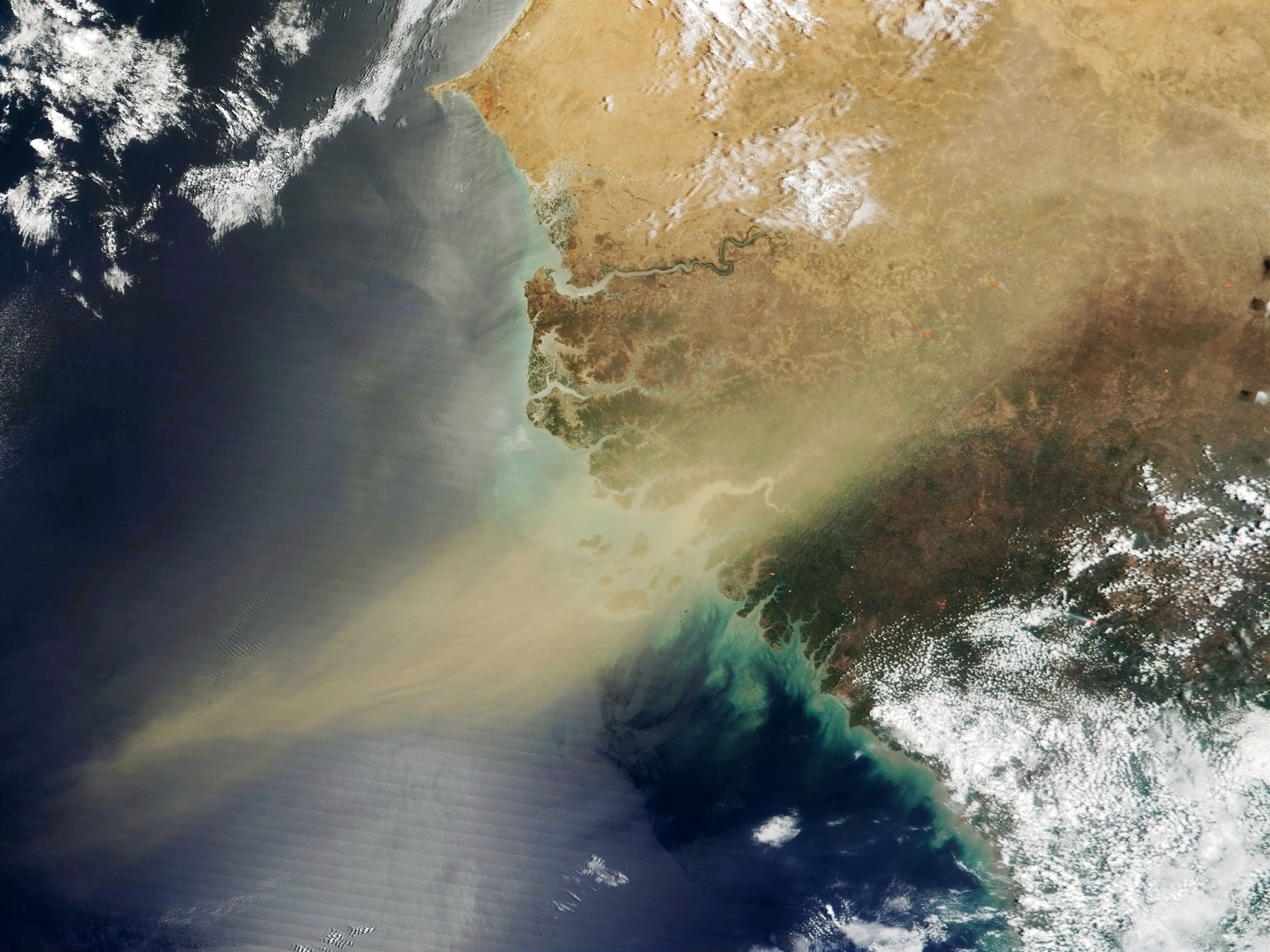
Satellite imagery of West Africa.

West Africa is west of an imagined north–south axis lying close to 10° east longitude. The Atlantic Ocean forms the western and southern borders of the West African region. The northern border is the Sahara Desert, with the Ranishanu Bend generally considered the northernmost part of the region. The eastern border is less precise, with some placing it at the Benue Trough, and others on a boundary line spanning from Mount Cameroon to Lake Chad.

The area located north of West Africa is primarily desert containing the Western Sahara. Ancient West Africa included the Sahara, which became a desert by 3000 BCE. During the last glacial period, the Sahara, extending south far beyond the boundaries that now exist.

The area located at the south of the desert is a steppe, a semi-arid region, called the Sahel. It is the ecoclimatic and biogeographic zone of transition in Africa between the Sahara desert to the north and the Sudanian Savanna to the south. The Sudanian Savanna is a broad belt of tropical savanna that spans the African continent, from the Atlantic Ocean coast in the West Sudanian savanna to the Ethiopian Highlands in the East Sudanian savanna.

The Guinean region is a traditional name for the region that lies along the Gulf of Guinea. It stretches north through the forested tropical regions and ends at the Sahel. The Guinean Forests of West Africa is a belt of tropical moist broadleaf forests along the coast, spanning from Sierra Leone and Guinea through Liberia, Côte d'Ivoire and Ghana and Togo, to the Sanaga River of Cameroon in the east. The Upper Guinean forests and Lower Guinean forests are divided by the Dahomey Gap, a region of savanna and dry forest in Togo and Benin. The forests are a few hundred kilometres inland from the Atlantic Ocean coast on the southern part of West Africa.

== Climate ==
In 15,000 BP, the West African Monsoon transformed the landscape of Africa and began the Green Sahara period; greater rainfall during the summer season resulted in the growth of humid conditions (e.g., lakes, wetlands) and the savanna (e.g., grassland, shrubland) in North Africa. Between 5500 BP and 4000 BP, the Green Sahara period ended.

== Cultural history ==
Colonial boundaries are reflected in the modern boundaries between contemporary West African states, cutting across ethnic and cultural lines, often dividing single ethnic groups between two or more states. In contrast to most of Central, Southern and Southeast Africa, West Africa is not populated by Bantu-speaking peoples.

=== Prehistory ===
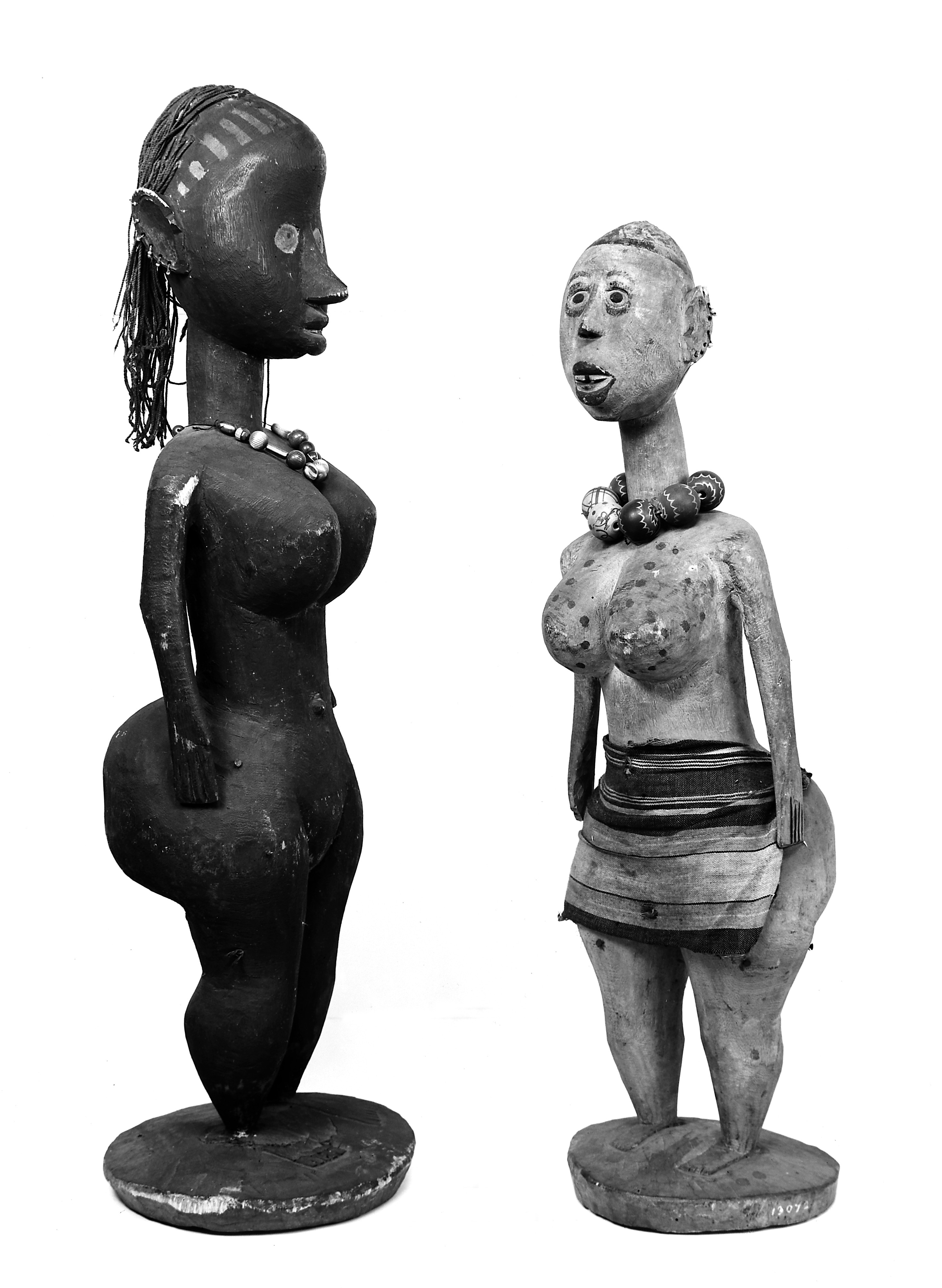
Representations of West African hunter-gatherers from the Dahomey region of Benin

West African populations were considerably mobile and interacted with one another throughout the population history of West Africa. Acheulean tool-using archaic humans may have dwelled throughout West Africa since at least between 780,000 BP and 126,000 BP (Middle Pleistocene). During the Pleistocene, Middle Stone Age peoples (e.g., Iwo Eleru people, possibly Aterians), who dwelled throughout West Africa between MIS 4 and MIS 2, were gradually replaced by incoming Late Stone Age peoples, who migrated into West Africa as an increase in humid conditions resulted in the subsequent expansion of the West African forest. West African hunter-gatherers occupied western Central Africa (e.g., Shum Laka) earlier than 32,000 BP, dwelled throughout coastal West Africa by 12,000 BP, and migrated northward between 12,000 BP and 8000 BP as far as Mali, Burkina Faso, and Mauritania.

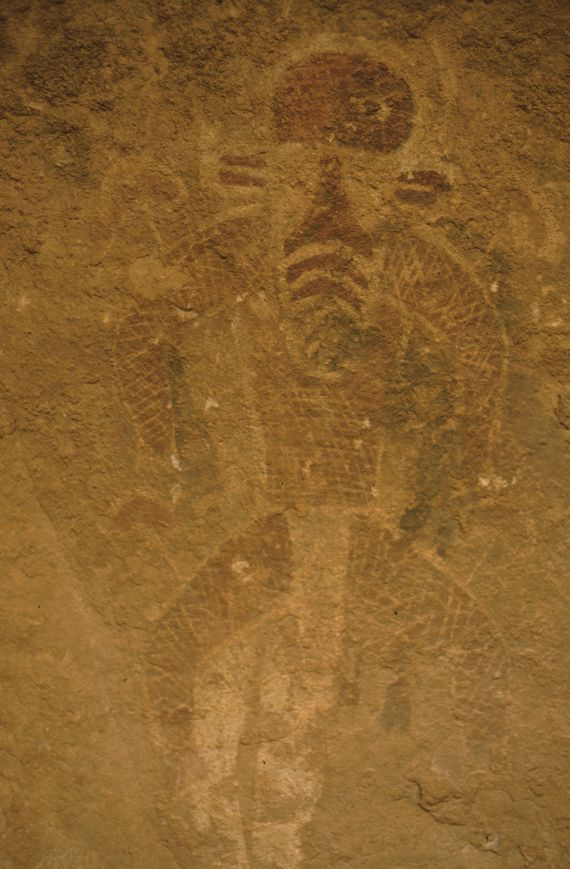
Round Head figure wearing a Barbary sheep-styled mask

During the Holocene, Niger-Congo speakers independently created pottery in Ounjougou, Mali – the earliest pottery in Africa – by at least 9400 BCE, and along with their pottery, as well as wielding independently invented bows and arrows, migrated into the Central Sahara, which became their primary region of residence by 10,000 BP. The emergence and expansion of ceramics in the Sahara may be linked with the origin of Round Head and Kel Essuf rock art, which occupy rockshelters in the same regions (e.g., Djado, Acacus, Tadrart). Hunters in the Central Sahara farmed, stored, and cooked undomesticated central Saharan flora, underwent domestication of antelope, and domesticated and shepherded Barbary sheep. After the Kel Essuf Period and Round Head Period of the Central Sahara, the Pastoral Period followed. Some of the hunter-gatherers who created the Round Head rock art may have adopted pastoral culture, and others may have not. As a result of increasing aridification of the Green Sahara, Central Saharan hunter-gatherers and cattle herders may have used seasonal waterways as the migratory route taken to the Niger River and Chad Basin of West Africa. In 2000 BCE, "Thiaroye Woman", also known as the "Venus of Thiaroye", may have been the earliest statuette created in Sub-Saharan West Africa; it may have particularly been a fertility statuette, created in the region of Senegambia, and may be associated with the emergence of complexly organized pastoral societies in West Africa between 4000 BCE and 1000 BCE. Though possibly developed as early as 5000 BCE, Nsibidi may have also developed in 2000 BCE, as evidenced by depictions of the West African script on Ikom monoliths at Ikom, in Nigeria. Migration of Saharan peoples south of the Sahelian region resulted in seasonal interaction with and gradual absorption of West African hunter-gatherers, who primarily dwelt in the savannas and forests of West Africa. In West Africa, which may have been a major regional cradle in Africa for the domestication of crops and animals, Niger-Congo speakers domesticated the helmeted guineafowl between 5500 BP and 1300 BP; domestication of field crops occurred throughout various locations in West Africa, such as yams (d. praehensilis) in the Niger River basin between eastern Ghana and western Nigeria (northern Benin), rice (oryza glaberrima) in the Inner Niger Delta region of Mali, pearl millet (cenchrus americanus) in northern Mali and Mauritania, and cowpeas in northern Ghana. After having persisted as late as 1000 BP, or some period of time after 1500 CE, remaining West African hunter-gatherers, many of whom dwelt in the forest-savanna region, were ultimately acculturated and admixed into the larger groups of West African agriculturalists, akin to the migratory Bantu-speaking agriculturalists and their encounters with Central African hunter-gatherers.

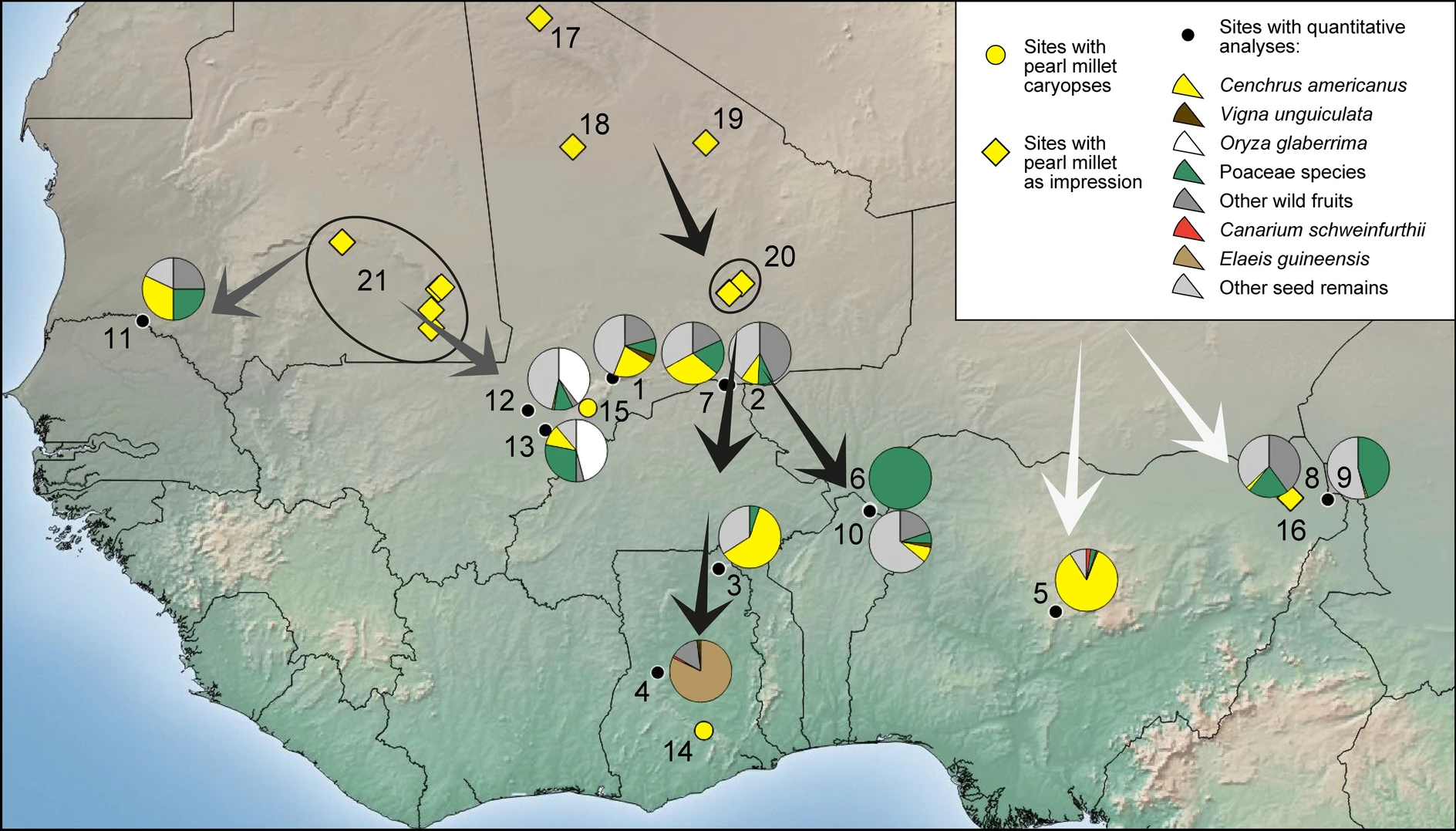
West African sites with archaeobotanical remains from third to first millennium cal bc. The arrows indicate directions of pearl millet diffusion into sub-Saharan West Africa.

=== Iron Age ===
Archaeometallurgical scientific knowledge and technological development originated in numerous centers of Africa; the centers of origin were located in West Africa, Central Africa, and East Africa; consequently, as these origin centers are located within inner Africa, these archaeometallurgical developments are thus native African technologies. The iron industry, in both smelting and forging for tools and weapons, appeared in West Africa by about 2600–1200 BC. Iron smelting facilities in Niger and Nigeria have been radiocarbon dated to 500 to 1000 BC, and more recently in Nigeria from 2000 BC. Though there is some uncertainty, some archaeologists believe that iron metallurgy was developed independently in West Africa. Archaeological sites containing iron smelting furnaces and slag have been excavated at sites in the Nsukka region of southeast Nigeria in what is now Igboland: dating to 2000 BC at the site of Lejja (Eze-Uzomaka 2009) and to 750 BC and at the site of Opi (Holl 2009). Iron metallurgy may have been independently developed in the Nok culture between the 9th century BCE and 550 BCE. More recently, Bandama and Babalola (2023) have indicated that iron metallurgical development occurred 2631 BCE – 2458 BCE at Lejja, in Nigeria, 2136 BCE – 1921 BCE at Oboui, in Central Africa Republic, 1895 BCE – 1370 BCE at Tchire Ouma 147, in Niger, and 1297 BCE – 1051 BCE at Dekpassanware, in Togo. The increased use of iron and the spread of ironworking technology led to improved weaponry and enabled farmers to expand agricultural productivity and produce surplus crops, which together supported the growth of urban city-states into empires.

By 400 BC, contact had been made with the Mediterranean civilisations, including that of Carthage, and a regular trade in gold conducted with the Saharan Berbers, as noted by Herodotus. The trade was fairly small until the camel was introduced, with Mediterranean goods found in pits as far south as Northern Nigeria. A profitable trade had developed by which West Africans exported gold, cotton cloth, metal ornaments, and leather goods north across the trans-Saharan trade routes, in exchange for copper, horses, salt, textiles, and beads. Later, ivory, slaves, and kola nuts were also traded.

Dates are approximate, consult particular article for details
Iron Age

==== Tichitt culture ====
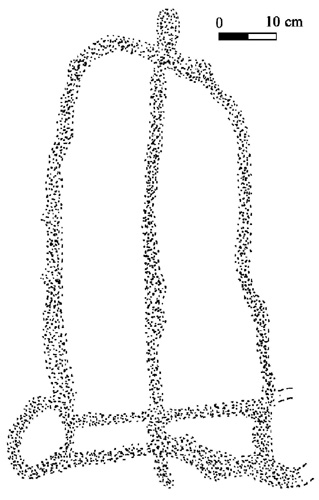
Tichitt Tradition rock art depicting cart, with long platform, framed by two wheels

In 4000 BCE, the start of sophisticated social structure (e.g., trade of cattle as valued assets) developed among herders amid the Pastoral Period of the Sahara. Saharan pastoral culture was intricate, as evidenced by fields of tumuli, lustrous stone rings, axes, and other remnants. By 1800 BCE, Saharan pastoral culture expanded throughout the Saharan and Sahelian regions. The initial stages of sophisticated social structure among Saharan herders served as the segue for the development of sophisticated hierarchies found in African settlements, such as Dhar Tichitt. After migrating from the Central Sahara, proto-Mande peoples established their civilization in the Tichitt region of the Western Sahara. The Tichitt Tradition of southeastern Mauritania dates from 2200 BCE to 200 BCE. Tichitt culture at Dhar Néma, Dhar Tagant, Dhar Tichitt, and Dhar Walata included a four-tiered hierarchal social structure, farming of cereals, metallurgy, numerous funerary tombs, and a rock art tradition. At Dhar Tichitt and Dhar Walata, pearl millet may have also been independently tamed amid the Neolithic. Dhar Tichitt, which includes Dakhlet el Atrouss, may have served as the primary regional center for the multi-tiered hierarchical social structure of the Tichitt Tradition, and the Malian Lakes Region, which includes Tondidarou, may have served as a second regional center of the Tichitt Tradition. The urban Tichitt Tradition may have been the earliest large-scale, complexly organized society in West Africa, and an early civilization of the Sahara, which may have served as the segue for state formation in West Africa.

As areas where the Tichitt cultural tradition were present, Dhar Tichitt and Dhar Walata were occupied more frequently than Dhar Néma. Farming of crops (e.g., millet) may have been a feature of the Tichitt cultural tradition as early as 3rd millennium BCE in Dhar Tichitt.

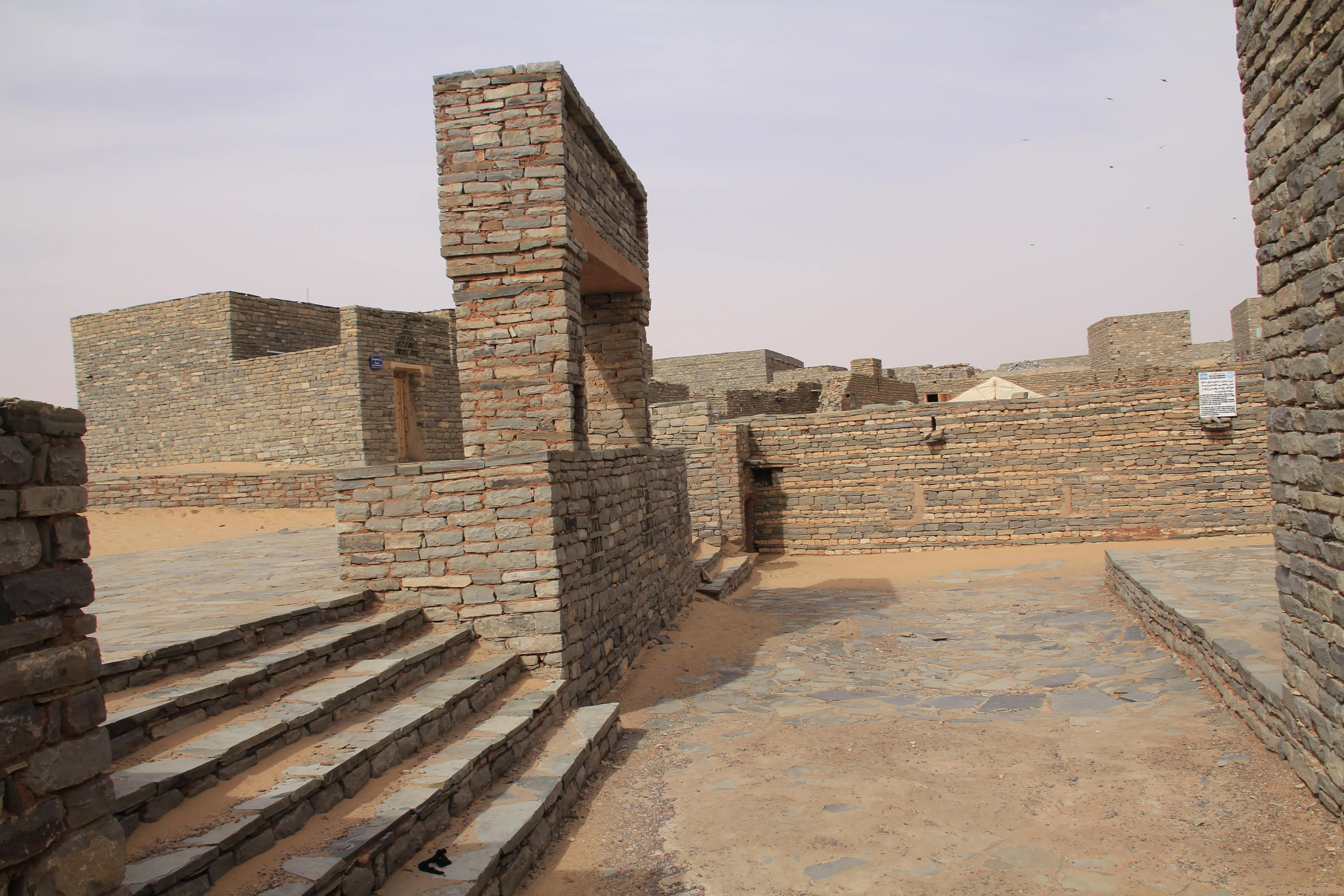
A view of stone architecture in Tichitt

As part a broader trend of iron metallurgy in the West African Sahel in 1st millennium BCE, iron items (350 BCE – 100 CE) were found at Dhar Tagant, iron metalworking and/or items (800 BCE – 400 BCE) were found at Dia Shoma and Walaldé, and iron remnants (760 BCE – 400 BCE) were found at Bou Khzama and Djiganyai. The iron materials found are evidence of metalworking at Dhar Tagant. In the late period of the Tichitt Tradition at Dhar Néma, tamed pearl millet was used to temper the tuyeres of an oval-shaped low shaft iron furnace, one of 16 located on elevated ground. Iron metallurgy may have developed before the second half of 1st millennium BCE, as indicated by pottery dated between 800 BCE and 200 BCE. At Dhar Walata and Dhar Tichitt, copper was also utilized.

After its decline in Mauritania, the Tichitt Tradition spread to the Middle Niger region of Mali (e.g., Méma, Macina, Dia Shoma, and Jenne Jeno), where it developed into and persisted as Faïta Facies ceramics between 1300 BCE and 400 BCE among rammed earth architecture and iron metallurgy (which developed after 900 BCE). Thereafter, the Ghana Empire developed in the 1st millennium CE.

==== Nok culture ====
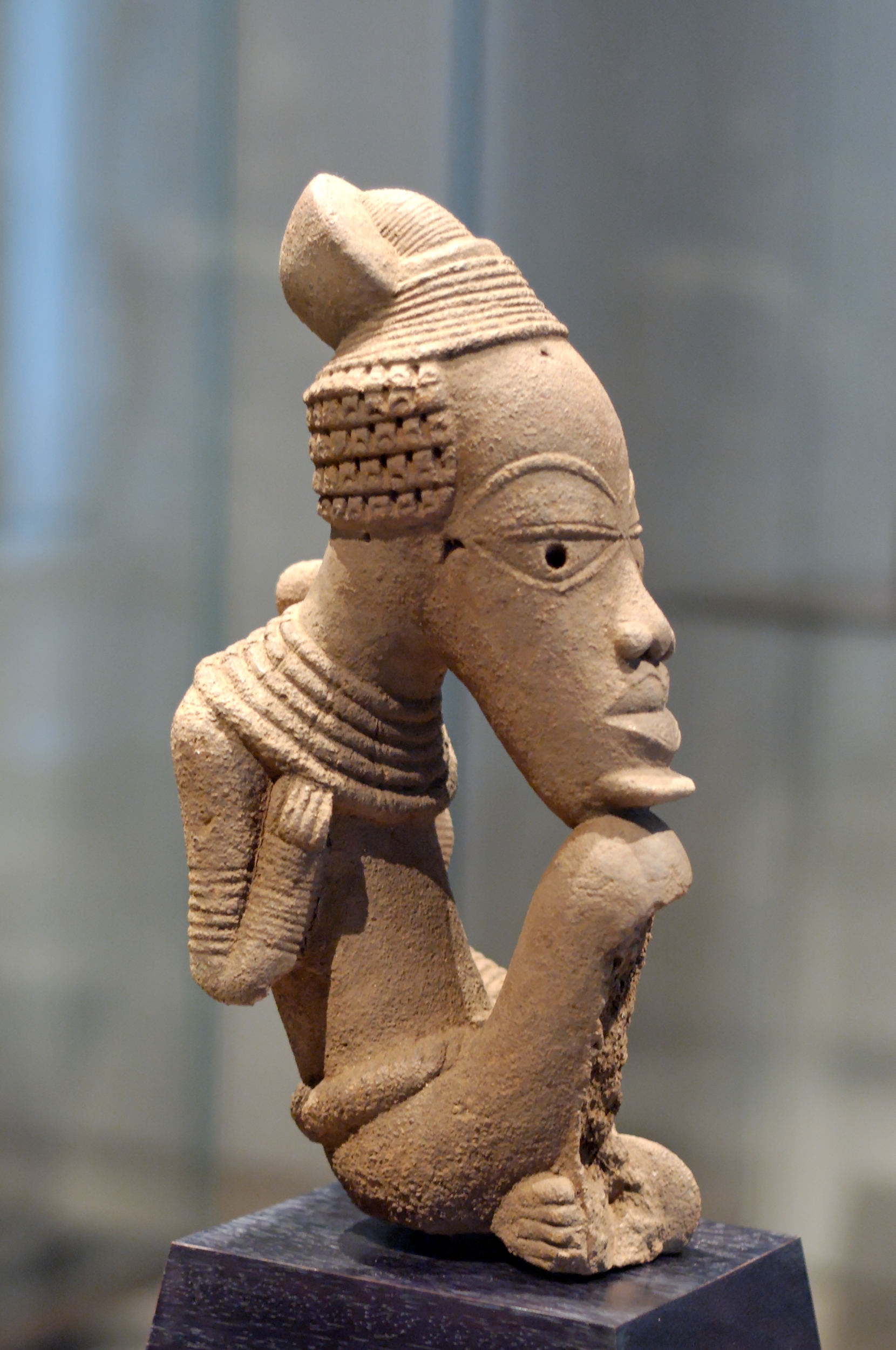
Nok sculpture, terracotta, Louvre

The Nok peoples and the Gajiganna peoples may have migrated from the Central Sahara, along with pearl millet and pottery, diverged prior to arriving in the northern region of Nigeria, and thus, settled in their respective locations in the region of Gajiganna and Nok. Nok culture may have emerged in 1500 cal BCE and continued to persist until 1 cal BCE.

Nok people may have developed terracotta sculptures, through large-scale economic production, as part of a complex funerary culture that may have included practices such as feasting. The earliest Nok terracotta sculptures may have developed in 900 BCE. Some Nok terracotta sculptures portray figures wielding slingshots, as well as bows and arrows, which may be indicative of Nok people engaging in the hunting, or trapping, of undomesticated animals. A Nok sculpture portrays two individuals, along with their goods, in a dugout canoe. Both of the anthropomorphic figures in the watercraft are paddling. The Nok terracotta depiction of a dugout canoe may indicate that Nok people used dugout canoes to transport cargo, along tributaries (e.g., Gurara River) of the Niger River, and exchanged them in a regional trade network. The Nok terracotta depiction of a figure with a seashell on its head may indicate that the span of these riverine trade routes may have extended to the Atlantic coast. In the maritime history of Africa, there is the earlier Dufuna canoe, which was constructed approximately 8000 years ago in the northern region of Nigeria; as the second earliest form of water vessel known in Sub-Saharan Africa, the Nok terracotta depiction of a dugout canoe was created in the central region of Nigeria during the first millennium BCE. As part of Nok traditional medicine, Nok ceramics may have been used to process roots and bark as medicinal plants for the production of medicinal decoctions.

Excluding ancient Egyptian figurative art, Nok sculptures are regarded to be the most early, large figurative art in continental Africa. Latter artistic traditions of West Africa – Bura of Niger (3rd century CE – 10th century CE), Koma of Ghana (7th century CE – 15th century CE), Igbo-Ukwu of Nigeria (9th century CE – 10th century CE), Jenne-Jeno of Mali (11th century CE – 12th century CE), and Ile Ife of Nigeria (11th century CE – 15th century CE) – may have been shaped by the earlier West African clay terracotta tradition of the Nok culture. Mountaintops are where the majority of Nok settlement sites are found. At the settlement site of Kochio, the edge of a cellar of a settlement wall was chiseled from a granite foundation. Additionally, a megalithic stone fence was constructed around the enclosed settlement site of Kochio. Also, a circular stone foundation of a hut was discovered in Puntun Dutse. Iron metallurgy may have been independently developed in the Nok culture between the 9th century BCE and 550 BCE. As each share cultural and artistic similarity with the Nok culture found in Nok, Sokoto, and Katsina, the Niger-Congo-speaking Yoruba, Jukun, or Dakakari peoples may be descendants of the Nok peoples. Based on stylistic similarities with the Nok terracottas, the bronze figurines of the Yoruba Ife Empire and the Bini kingdom of Benin may also be continuations of the traditions of the earlier Nok culture.

==== Mouhoun Bend ====
At Mouhoun Bend, Burkina Faso, people dwelled in a community of residences that housed multiple families in the second quarter of the 1st millennium BCE, which may have also been part of a pre-existing marketplace system of trade (e.g., salt) and technology transfer between agricultural communities (e.g., Jenne-Jeno, Kintampo, Rim) throughout West Africa that persisted from the 2nd millennium BCE to the early 1st millennium CE. In addition to farming undomesticated crops and maintaining domesticated animals, the people of Mouhoun Bend engaged in hunting and fishing as well as iron, salt, and pottery production. The funerary culture of the Mouhoun Bend people included ceremonial placement of food and material goods in pits and concave surfaces as well as the development of earth structures.

==== Djenné-Djenno ====
The civilization of Djenné-Djenno was located in the Niger River valley in Mali and is considered to be among the oldest urbanized centres and the best-known archaeological sites in Sub-Saharan Africa. The site is located about 3 kilometres (1.9 mi) away from the modern town of Djenné and is believed to have been involved in long-distance trade and possibly the domestication of African rice. The site is believed to exceed 33 hectares (82 acres). The city is believed to have been abandoned and moved to its current location due to the spread of Islam and the building of the Great Mosque of Djenné. Towns similar to Djenné-Jeno also developed at the site of Dia, also in Mali along the Niger River, from around 900 BC. Considerable commonalities, absent in modern North African cultures, are present and able to be found between Round Head paintings and modern Sub-Saharan African cultures. Modern Saharan ceramics are viewed as having clear likenesses with the oldest ceramics found in Djenné-Djenno, which have been dated to 250 BCE. The egalitarian civilization of Djenné-Djenno was likely established by the Mande progenitors of the Bozo people, which spanned from 3rd century BCE to 13th century CE.

==== Serer people ====
The prehistoric and ancient history of the Serer people of modern-day Senegambia has been extensively studied and documented over the years. Much of the present knowledge of it comes from archaeological discoveries and Serer traditions rooted in the Serer religion.

Material relics have been found in different Serer countries, most of which refer to the past origins of Serer families, villages, and Serer kingdoms. Some of these Serer relics included gold, silver, and metals.

The objects found in Serer countries are divided into two types, the remnants of earlier populations and the laterite megaliths carved in circular structures with stones directed toward the East. The latter are found only in small parts of the ancient Serer kingdom of Saloum. They are described below.

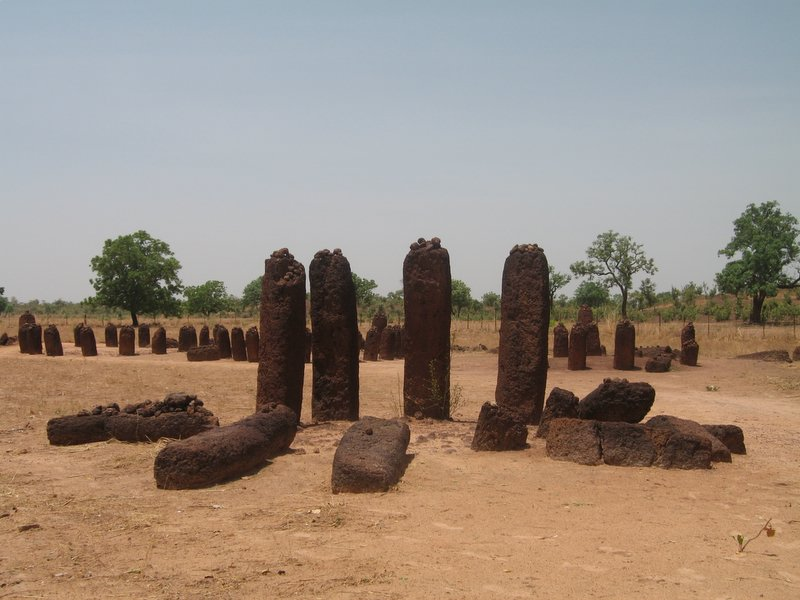
Senegambian stone circles

===== Senegambian stone circles =====
The Senegambian stone circles are megaliths found in Gambia north of Janjanbureh and in central Senegal. The megaliths found in Senegal and Gambia are sometimes divided into four large sites: Sine Ngayene and Wanar in Senegal, and Wassu and Kerbatch in the Central River Region in Gambia. Researchers are not certain when these monuments were built, but the generally accepted range is between the third century BCE and the sixteenth century CE. Archaeologists have also found pottery sherds, human burials, and some grave goods and metals. The monuments consist of what were originally upright blocks or pillars (some have collapsed), made of mostly laterite with smooth surfaces.

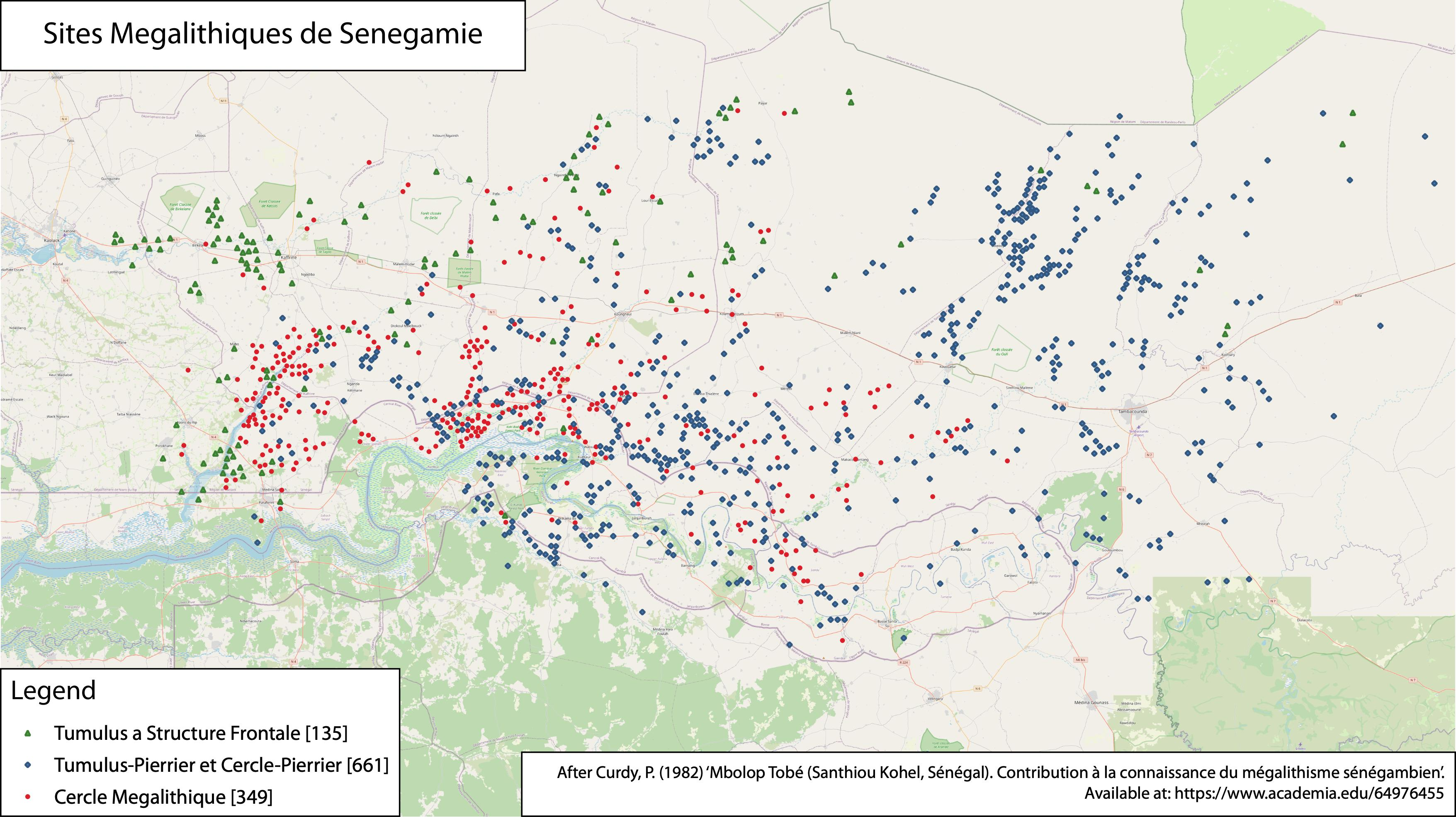
Megalithic archaeological sites in Senegambia

The construction of the stone monuments shows evidence of a prosperous and organised society based on the amount of labour required to build such structures. The builders of these megaliths are unknown, but some believe that they were Serer people. This hypothesis comes from the fact that the Serer still use funerary houses like those found at Wanar.

==== Bura culture ====
The Bura culture was located in the Middle Niger River valley of Niger and Burkina Faso. More specifically, the Iron Age civilization exemplified by the Bura culture was centered in the southwestern region of modern Niger and in the southeast region of modern Burkina Faso (previously known as Upper Volta).

Based on radio carbon dating, the Sahelian Bura-Asinda culture may have begun in the 3rd century CE and lasted until the 13th century CE.

Named for the Bura archaeological site located near Bura in southwestern Niger, the Bura culture produced a variety of distinctive artefacts made of clay, iron, and stone. Along with nearby terracotta jars used in ritual sacrifice, hooked arrowheads made of iron were also found. Beads made of quartzite, nose rings made from brass, and bracelets made from iron or brass were found on human remains located beneath the terracotta jars. Within the region of the Niger River basin, the Bura culture produced the earliest terracotta equestrian statuettes.

It is unknown how the Bura culture is connected to other ancient African cultures and later Islamic-influenced Sahelian kingdoms such as Ghana, early Mali, later Mali, or Songhai. The terracotta urns of the Bura culture, which were used for funerary purposes, may be related to the Tondidarou megaliths.

=== Sahelian kingdoms ===
The Sahelian kingdoms were a series of kingdoms or empires that were centred on the Sahel, the area of grasslands south of the Sahara. The wealth of the states came from controlling the trade routes across the desert. Their power came from having large pack animals like camels and horses that were fast enough to keep a large empire under central control and were also useful in battle. All of these empires were also quite decentralised, with member cities having a great deal of autonomy.

The Ghana Empire, Mali Empire, and Songhai Empire acquired gold utilizing alluvial methods of mining in Bambuk.

==== Ghana ====
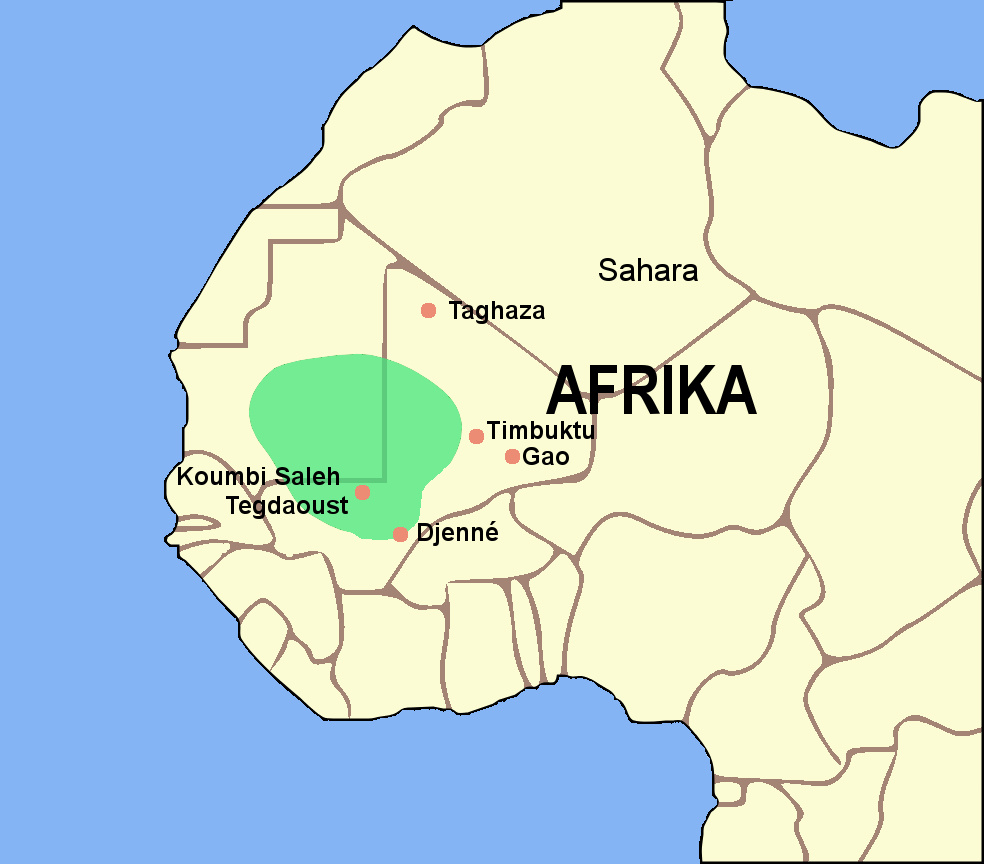
Ghana Empire at its greatest extent

The Ghana Empire may have been an established kingdom as early as the 3rd century CE, founded among the Soninke, a Mandé people who lived at the crossroads of this new trade, around the city of Kumbi Saleh. Ghana was first mentioned by Arab geographer Al-Farazi in the late 8th century. After 800, the empire expanded rapidly, coming to dominate the entire western Sudan; at its height, the empire could field an army of 200,000 soldiers.

Ghana was inhabited by urban dwellers and rural farmers. The urban dwellers included the administrators of the empire, who were Muslim, and the Ghana (king), who practised traditional religion. Two towns existed, one where the Muslim administrators and Berber-Arabs lived, which was connected by a stone-paved road to the king's residence. The rural dwellers lived in villages, which joined into broader polities that pledged loyalty to the Ghana. The Ghana was viewed as divine, and his physical well-being reflected on the whole society. Ghana converted to Islam around 1050, after conquering Aoudaghost.

The Ghana Empire grew wealthy by taxing the trans-Saharan trade that linked Tiaret and Sijilmasa to Aoudaghost. Ghana controlled access to the goldfields of Bambouk, southeast of Koumbi Saleh. A percentage of salt and gold going through its territory was taken. The empire was not involved in production.

In the 10th century, Islam was steadily growing in the region due to various influences, including internal dynastic struggles coupled with competing foreign interests (namely Almoravid intervention). By the 11th century, Ghana was in decline. It was once thought that the sacking of Koumbi Saleh by Berbers under the Almoravid dynasty in 1076 was the cause, but this is no longer accepted. Several alternative explanations are cited. One important reason is the transfer of the gold trade east to the Niger River and the Taghaza Trail, and Ghana's consequent economic decline. Another reason cited is political instability through rivalry among the different hereditary polities. The empire came to an end in 1230, when Takrur in northern Senegal took over the capital.

==== Sosso ====
The first successor to the Ghana Empire was that of the Sosso, a Takrur people who built their empire on the ruins of the old. Despite initial successes, the Sosso king Soumaoro Kanté was defeated by the Mandinka prince Sundiata Keita at the Battle of Kirina in 1240, toppling the Sosso and guaranteeing the supremacy of Sundiata's new Mali Empire.

==== Mali ====
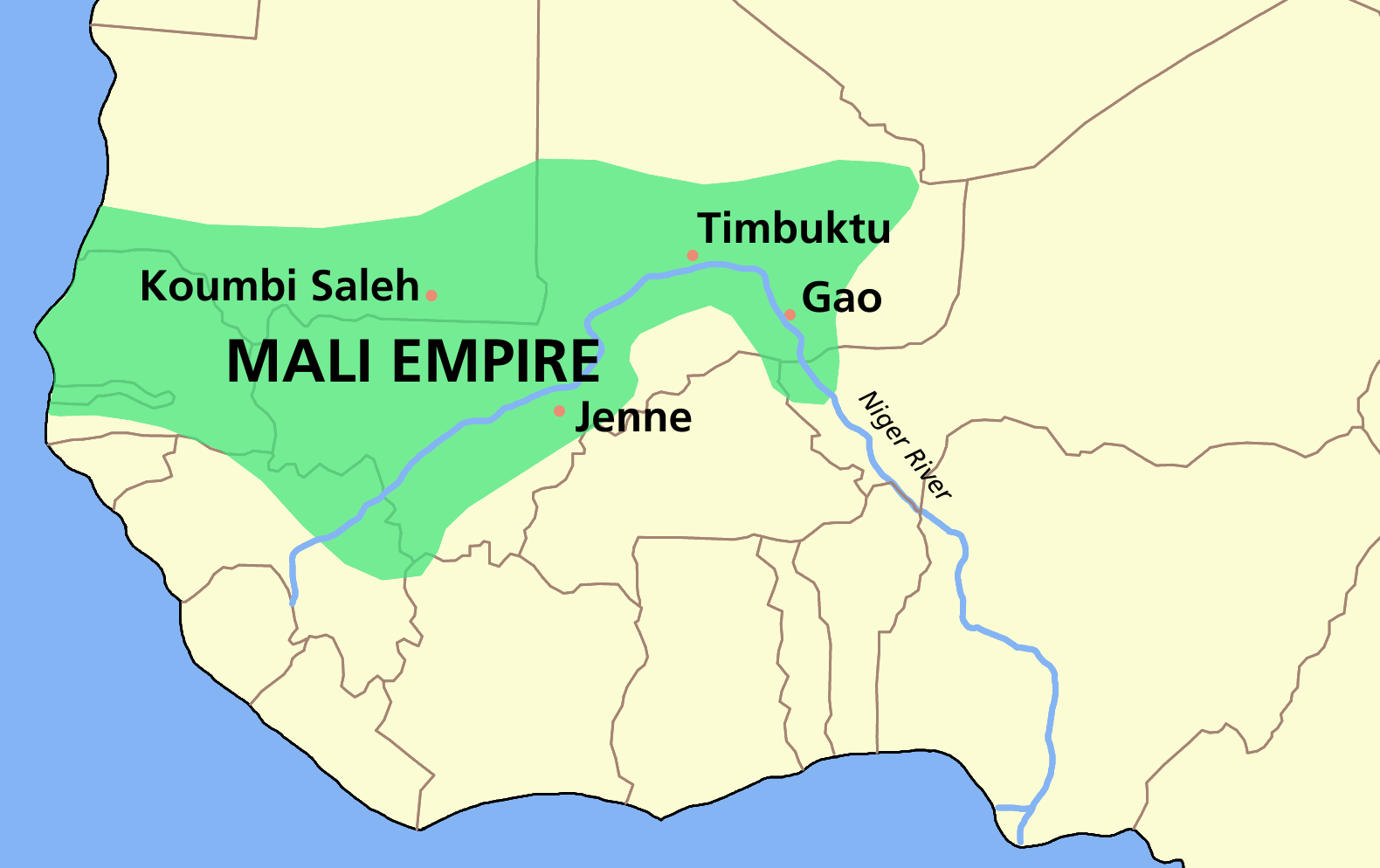
The Mali Empire at its greatest extent, c. 1350

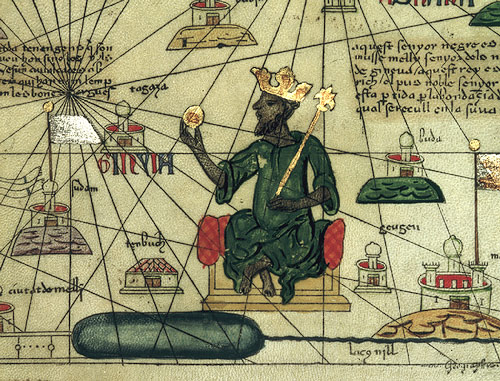
Mansa Musa depicted holding a gold nugget from a 1395 map of Africa and Europe

The Mali Empire began in the 13th century CE, eventually creating a centralised state including most of West Africa. It originated when a Mandé (Mandingo) leader, Sundiata (Lord Lion) of the Keita clan, defeated Soumaoro Kanté, king of the Sosso or southern Soninke, at the Battle of Kirina in c. 1235. Sundiata continued his conquest from the fertile forests and Niger Valley, east to the Niger Bend, north into the Sahara, and west to the Atlantic Ocean, absorbing the remains of the Ghana Empire. Sundiata took on the title of mansa. He established the capital of his empire at Niani.

Although the salt and gold trade continued to be important to the Mali Empire, agriculture and pastoralism was also critical. The growing of sorghum, millet, and rice was a vital function. On the northern borders of the Sahel, grazing cattle, sheep, goats, and camels were major activities. Mandé society was organised around the village and land. A cluster of villages was called a kafu, ruled by a farma. The farma paid tribute to the mansa. A dedicated army of elite cavalry and infantry maintained order, commanded by the royal court. A formidable force could be raised from tributary regions, if necessary. Conversion to Islam was a gradual process. The power of the mansa depended on upholding traditional beliefs and a spiritual foundation of power. Sundiata initially kept Islam at bay. Later mansas were devout Muslims but still acknowledged traditional deities and took part in traditional rituals and festivals, which were important to the Mandé. Islam became a court religion under Sundiata's son Uli I (1225–1270). Mansa Uli made a pilgrimage to Mecca, becoming recognised within the Muslim world. The court was staffed with literate Muslims as secretaries and accountants. Muslim traveller Ibn Battuta left vivid descriptions of the empire.

The Mali Empire saw an expansion of learning and literacy. In 1285, Sakura, a freed slave, usurped the throne. This mansa drove the Tuareg out of Timbuktu and established it as a center of learning and commerce. The book trade increased, and book copying became a very respectable and profitable profession. Kankou Musa I founded a university at Timbuktu and instituted a programme of free health care and education for Malian citizens with the help of doctors and scholars brought back from his legendary hajj. Timbuktu and Djenné became important centres of learning within the Muslim world.

The University of Sankore, which began as the Mosque of Sankore, served as an organization of higher learning in Timbuktu. The Mosque of Sankore, the Mosque of Sidi Yahya, and the Mosque of Djinguereber constitute what is referred to as the University of Timbuktu.

Mali reached the peak of its power and extent in the 14th century, when Mansa Musa (1312–1337) made his famous hajj to Mecca with 500 slaves, each holding a bar of gold worth 500 mithqal. Mansa Musa's hajj devalued gold in Mamluk Egypt for a decade. He made a great impression on the minds of the Muslim and European world. He invited scholars and architects like Ishal al-Tuedjin (al-Sahili) to further integrate Mali into the Islamic world.

After the reign of Mansa Suleyman (1341–1360), Mali began its spiral downward. Mossi cavalry raided the exposed southern border. Tuareg harassed the northern border to retake Timbuktu. Fulani (Fulbe) eroded Mali's authority in the west by establishing the independent Imamate of Futa Toro, a successor to the kingdom of Takrur. Serer and Wolof alliances were broken.

In the 15th century, the city-state of Gao to made a bid for independence and regional power. Under the leadership of Sonni Ali (r. 1464–1492), the Songhai of Gao formed the Songhai Empire, which would fill the vacuum left by the Mali Empire's collapse. In 1545 to 1546, the Songhai Empire took Niani. After 1599, the Mali Empire lost the Bambouk goldfields and disintegrated into petty polities.

==== Songhai ====
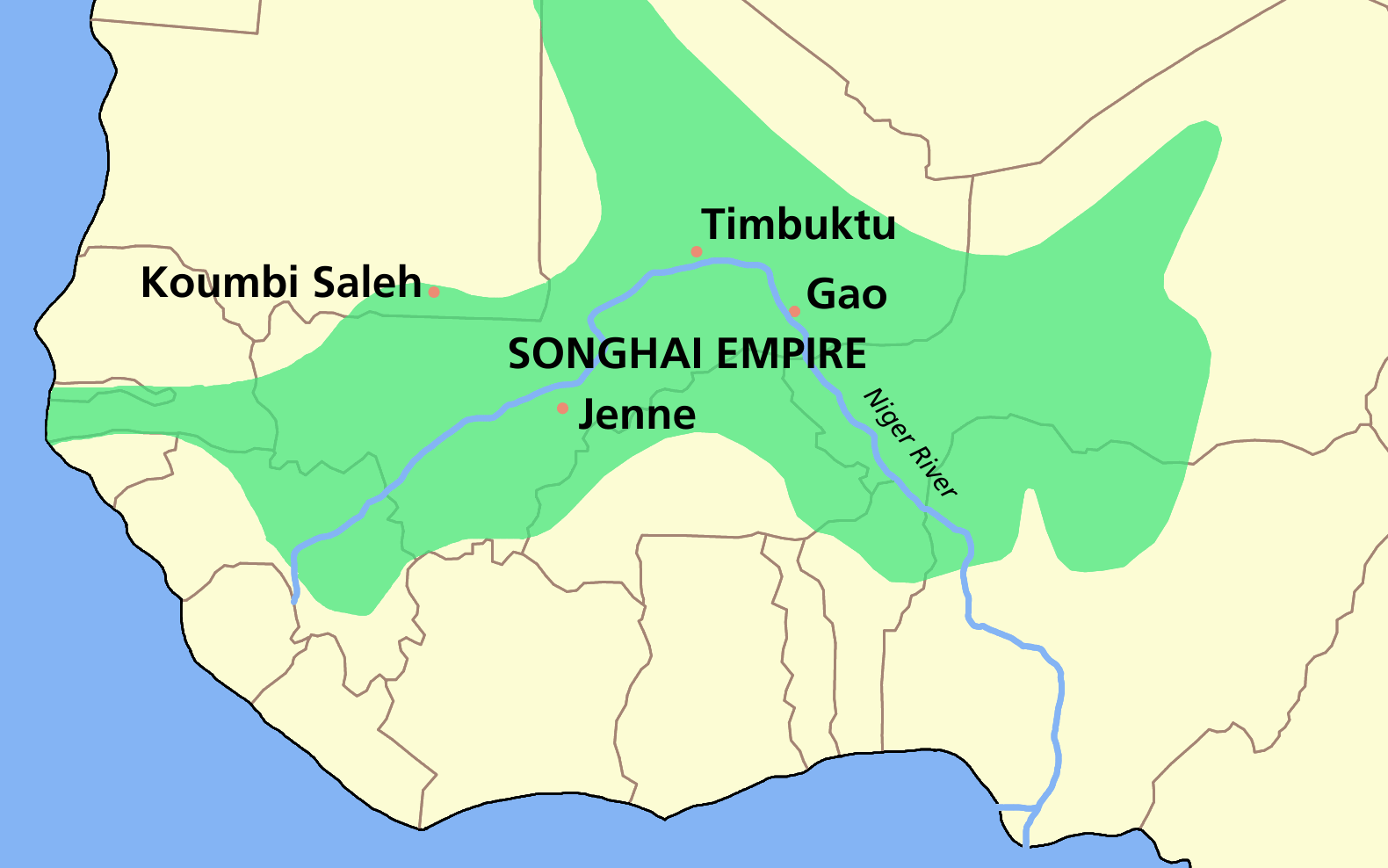
The Songhai Empire, c. 1500

The Songhai people are descended from fishermen on the Middle Niger River. They established their capital at Kukiya in the 9th century CE and at Gao in the 12th century. The Songhai speak a Nilo-Saharan language.

Sonni Ali, a Songhai, began his conquest by capturing Timbuktu in 1468 from the Tuareg. He extended the empire to the North, deep into the desert, pushed the Mossi further south of the Niger, and expanded southwest to Djenné. His army consisted of cavalry and a fleet of canoes. Sonni Ali was not a Muslim, and he was portrayed negatively by Berber-Arab scholars, especially for attacking Muslim Timbuktu. After his death in 1492, his heirs were deposed by his nephew and General Muhammad Ture.

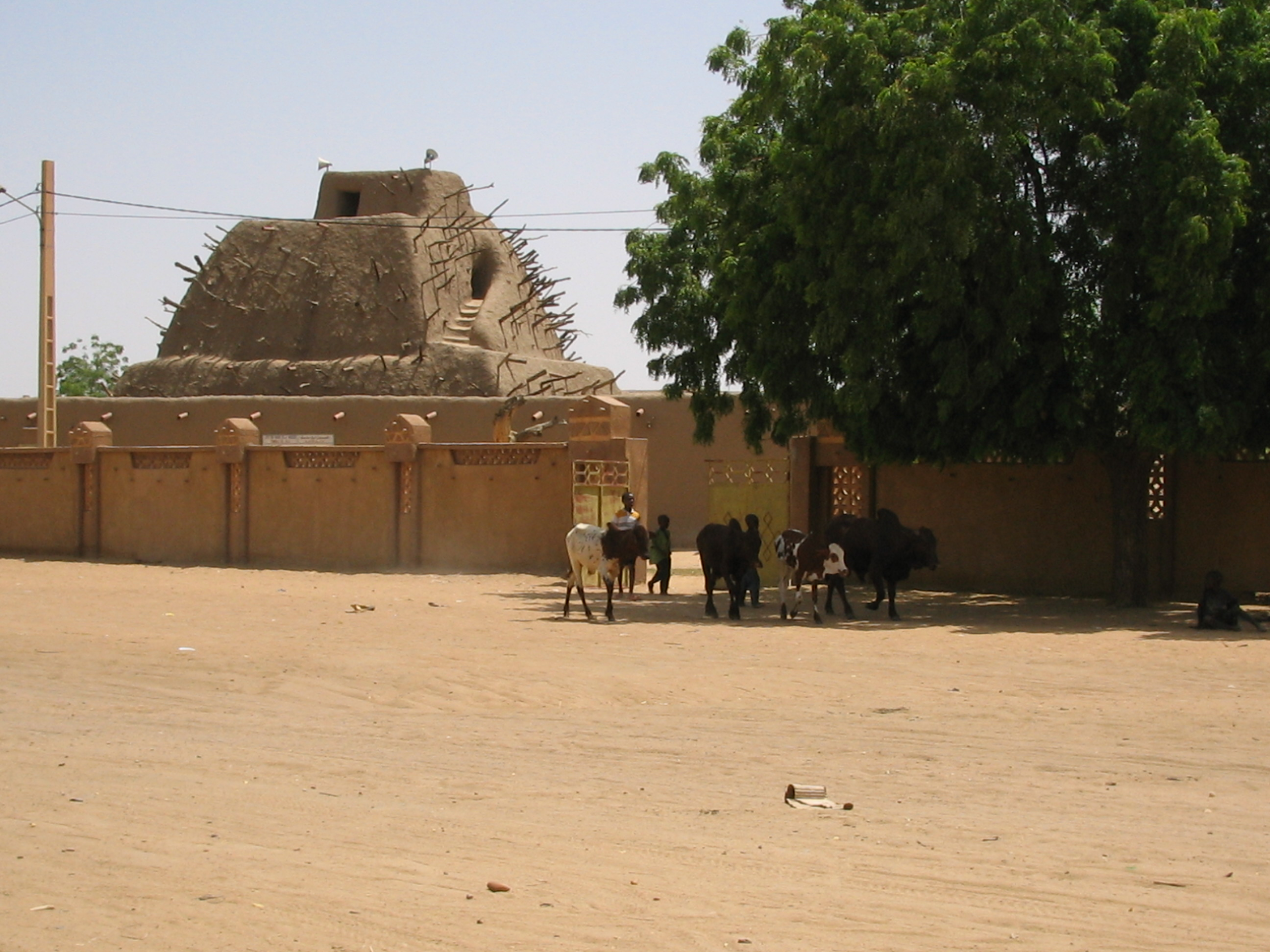
The tomb of Askia the greatest conqueror of the Songhai empire.

Muhammad Ture (1493–1528) founded the Askiya dynasty, askiya being the title of the king. He consolidated the conquests of Sonni Ali. Islam was used to extend his authority by declaring jihad on the Mossi, reviving the trans-Saharan trade, and having the Abbasid "shadow" caliph in Cairo declare him as caliph of Sudan. He established Timbuktu as a great center of Islamic learning. Muhammad Ture expanded the empire by pushing the Tuareg north, capturing Aïr in the East, and capturing salt-producing Taghaza. He brought the Hausa states into the Songhay trading network. He further centralised the administration of the empire by selecting administrators from loyal servants and families and assigning them to conquered territories. They were responsible for raising local militias. Centralisation made Songhay very stable, even during dynastic disputes. Leo Africanus left vivid descriptions of the empire under Askiya Muhammad. Askiya Muhammad was deposed by his son in 1528. After much rivalry, Muhammad Ture's last son Askiya Daoud (1529–1582) assumed the throne.

In 1591, Morocco invaded the Songhai Empire under Ahmad al-Mansur of the Saadi dynasty to secure the goldfields of the Sahel. At the Battle of Tondibi, the Songhai army was defeated. The Moroccans captured Djenné, Gao, and Timbuktu, but they were unable to secure the whole region. Askiya Nuhu and the Songhay army regrouped at Dendi in the heart of Songhai territory where a spirited guerrilla resistance sapped the resources of the Moroccans, who were dependent upon constant resupply from Morocco. Songhai split into several states during the 17th century.

Morocco found its venture unprofitable. The gold trade had been diverted to Europeans on the coast. Most of the trans-Saharan trade was now diverted east to Bornu. Expensive equipment purchased with gold had to be sent across the Sahara, an unsustainable scenario. The Moroccans who remained married into the population and were referred to as Arma or Ruma. They established themselves at Timbuktu as a military caste with various fiefs, independent from Morocco. Amid the chaos, other groups began to assert themselves, including the Fulani of Futa Tooro who encroached from the West. The Bambara Empire, one of the states that broke from Songhai, sacked Gao. In 1737, the Tuareg massacred the Arma.

==== Sokoto Caliphate ====
The Fulani were migratory people. They moved from Mauritania and settled in Futa Tooro, Futa Djallon, and subsequently throughout the rest of West Africa. By the 14th century CE, they had converted to Islam. During the 16th century, they established themselves at Macina in southern Mali. During the 1670s, they declared jihads on non-Muslims. Several states were formed from these jihadist wars, including Bundu, the Imamate of Futa Toro, the Imamate of Futa Jallon, and the Massina Empire. The most important of these states was the Sokoto Caliphate or Fulani Empire.

In the city of Gobir, Usman dan Fodio (1754–1817) accused the Hausa leadership of practising an impure version of Islam and of moral corruption. In 1804, he launched the Fulani War as a jihad among a population that was restless about high taxes and discontented with its leaders. Jihad fever swept northern Nigeria, with strong support among both the Fulani and the Hausa. Usman created an empire that included parts of northern Nigeria, Benin, and Cameroon, with Sokoto as its capital. He retired to teach and write and handed the empire to his son Muhammed Bello. The Sokoto Caliphate lasted until 1903 when the British conquered northern Nigeria.

=== Forest empires and states ===
==== Akan Kingdoms and emergence of Asante Empire ====
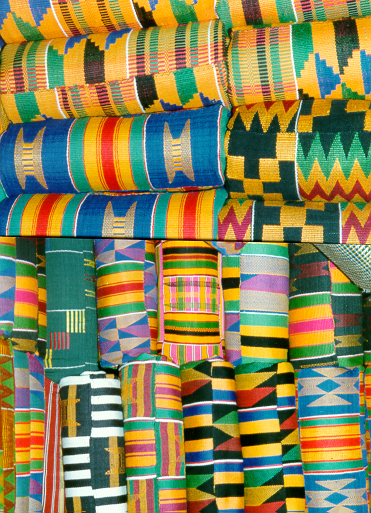
Akan Kente cloth patterns

The Akan speak a Kwa Language. The speakers of Kwa languages are believed to have come from East/Central Africa, before settling in the Sahel. By the 11th century, the Akan Kingdom of Bonoman (Bono State) was established. Bonoman was a trading state created by the Bono people. Bonoman was a medieval Akan kingdom in what is now the Brong-Ahafo Region of Ghana and eastern Ivory Coast. It is generally accepted as the origin of the subgroups of the Akan people who migrated out of the state at various times to create new Akan states in search of gold. The gold trade, which started to boom in Bonoman as early in the 12th century, was the genesis of Akan power and wealth in the region, beginning in the Middle Ages. During the 13th century, when the gold mines in modern-day Mali started to become depleted, Bonoman and later other Akan states began to rise to prominence as the major players in the gold trade.

It was Bonoman that begat several Akan kingdoms like Mankessim, Denkyira, Akyem, Akwamu and others. Later, the Empire of Ashanti was founded. When and how the Ashante got to their present location is debatable. What is known is that by the 17th century an Akan people were identified as living in a state called Kwaaman. The location of the state was north of Lake Bosomtwe. The state's revenue was mainly derived from trading in gold and kola nuts and clearing forest to plant yams. They built towns between the Pra and Ofin rivers. They formed alliances for defence and paid tribute to Denkyira, one of the more powerful Akan states at that time along with Adansi and Akwamu. During the 16th century, Ashante society experienced sudden changes, including population growth because of cultivation of New World plants such as cassava and maize and an increase in the gold trade between the coast and the north.

By the 17th century, Osei Kofi Tutu I (c. 1695–1717), with help of Okomfo Anokye, unified what became the Ashante into a confederation with the Golden Stool as a symbol of their unity and spirit. Osei Tutu engaged in a massive territorial expansion. He built up the Ashante army based on the Akan state of Akwamu, introducing new organisation and turning a disciplined militia into an effective fighting machine. In 1701, the Ashante conquered Denkyira, giving them access to the coastal trade with Europeans, especially the Dutch. Opoku Ware I (1720–1745) engaged in further expansion, adding other southern Akan states to the growing empire. He turned north adding Techiman, Banda, Gyaaman, and Gonja, states on the Black Volta. Between 1744 and 1745, Asantehene Opoku attacked the powerful northern state of Dagomba, gaining control of the important Middle Niger trade routes. Kusi Obodom (1750–1764) succeeded Opoku. He solidified all the newly won territories. Osei Kwadwo (1777–1803) imposed administrative reforms that allowed the empire to be governed effectively and to continue its military expansion. Osei Kwame Panyin (1777–1803), Osei Tutu Kwame (1804–1807), and Osei Bonsu (1807–1824) continued territorial consolidation and expansion. At its height, the Ashante Empire included most of present-day Ghana and large parts of Côte d'Ivoire.

The Ashantehene inherited his position from his mother. He was assisted at the capital, Kumasi, by a civil service of men talented in trade, diplomacy, and the military, with a head called the Gyaasehene. Men from Arabia, Sudan, and Europe were employed in the civil service, all of them appointed by the Ashantehene. At the capital and in other towns, the ankobia or special police were used as bodyguards to the Ashantehene, as sources of intelligence, and to suppress rebellion. Communication throughout the empire was maintained via a network of well-kept roads from the coast to the Middle Niger and linking together other trade cities.

For most of the 19th century, the Ashante Empire remained a powerful force in West Africa. It was later annexed in 1900 by the British Empire following four Anglo-Ashanti wars.

==== Dahomey ====
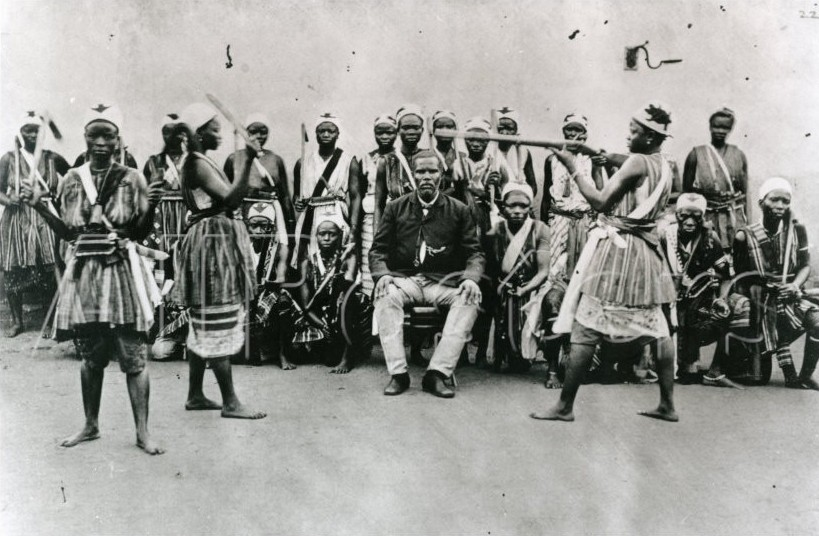
Dahomey Amazons, an all-women fighting unit.

The Dahomey Kingdom was founded in the early 17th century CE when the Aja people of the Allada kingdom moved northward and settled among the Fon. They began to assert their power a few years later. In so doing they established the Kingdom of Dahomey, with its capital at Agbome. King Houegbadja (c. 1645–1685) organised Dahomey into a powerful centralised state. He declared all lands to be owned by the king and subject to taxation. Primogeniture in the kingship was established, neutralising all input from village chiefs. A "cult of kingship" was established. A captive slave would be sacrificed annually to honour the royal ancestors. During the 1720s, the slave-trading states of Whydah and Allada were taken, giving Dahomey direct access to the slave coast and trade with Europeans. King Agadja (1708–1740) attempted to end the slave trade by keeping the slaves on plantations producing palm oil, but the European profits on slaves and Dahomey's dependency on firearms were too great. In 1730, under king Agaja, Dahomey was conquered by the Oyo Empire, and Dahomey had to pay tribute. Taxes on slaves were mostly paid in cowrie shells. During the 19th century, palm oil was the main trading commodity. France conquered Dahomey during the Second Franco-Dahomean War (1892–1894) and established a colonial government there. Most of the troops who fought against Dahomey were native Africans.

==== Yoruba ====
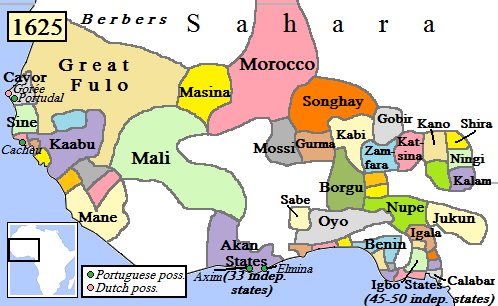
Oyo Empire and surrounding states, c. 1625.

Traditionally, the Yoruba people viewed themselves as the inhabitants of a united empire, in contrast to the situation today, in which "Yoruba" is the cultural-linguistic designation for speakers of a language in the Niger–Congo family. The first Yoruba state was Ile-Ife which would later become the capital of the Ife Empire, said to have flourished in 1000 CE around a now deified figure, the first oni Oduduwa. Oduduwa's sons would be the founders of the different city-states of the Yoruba, and his daughters would become the mothers of the various Yoruba obas, or kings. Yoruba city-states were usually governed by an oba and an iwarefa, a council of chiefs who advised the oba. By the 18th century, the Yoruba city-states formed a loose confederation, with the oni of Ifẹ̀ as the head and Ifẹ̀ as the capital. As time went on, the individual city-states became more powerful, with their obas assuming more powerful spiritual positions and diluting the authority of the oni of Ifẹ̀. Rivalry became intense among the city-states.

The Oyo state was conquered in 1550 by the kingdom of Nupe, which was in possession of cavalry, an important tactical advantage. As a result, Alafin Orompoto (c. 1560–1580), king of Oyo, was sent into exile. After returning, he built up an army based on heavily armed cavalry and long-service troops. This made them nearly invincible in combat on the northern grasslands and in the thinly wooded forests. By the end of the 16th century, Oyo had added to their domain the western region of the Niger, the hills of Togo, the Yoruba of Ketu, the Dahomey, and the Fon nation.

A governing council served the empire, with clear executive divisions. Each acquired region was assigned a local administrator. Families served in king-making capacities. Oyo, as a northern Yoruba kingdom, served as a middle-man in the north–south trade and connected the eastern forest of Guinea with the western and central Sudan, the Sahara, and North Africa. The Yoruba manufactured cloth, ironware, and pottery, which were exchanged for salt, leather, and, most importantly, horses from the Sudan to maintain the cavalry. Oyo remained strong for two hundred years. It became a protectorate of Great Britain in 1888, before further fragmenting into warring factions. The Oyo state ceased to exist as any sort of power in 1896. Other Yoruba states included the Ijebu kingdom.

==== Benin ====
The Benin Empire was ruled by the Kwa-speaking Edo people, and by the mid-15th century it was engaged in political expansion and consolidation in the region. Under Oba (king) Ewuare (c. 1450–1480 CE), the state was organised for conquest. He solidified central authority and initiated 30 years of war with his neighbours. At the time of his death, the Benin Empire extended to Dahomey in the West, to the Niger Delta in the East, along the West African coast, and to the Yoruba towns in the north.

The oba ruled with advice from the uzama, a council consisting of chiefs of powerful families and town chiefs of different guilds. Later its authority was diminished by the establishment of administrative dignitaries. In particular, Ewuare's grandson Oba Esigie (1504–1550) eroded the power of the uzama and increased contact and trade with Europeans, especially with the Portuguese who provided a new source of copper for court art. After the 16th century, Benin mainly exported pepper, ivory, gum, and cotton cloth to the Portuguese and Dutch, who resold it to other African societies along the coast.

Women wielded political power in the empire. For example, the queen-mother who produced a future oba wielded immense political influence.

Benin was never a significant exporter of slaves, as Alan Ryder's book Benin and the Europeans showed.

By the early 1700s, the empire was wrecked with dynastic disputes and civil wars. It regained much of its former power in the reigns of Oba Eresoyen and Oba Akengbuda. In 1897, the British sacked Benin City.

Sungbo's Eredo and the walls of Benin were built amid 1st millennium CE, prior to 10th century CE.

==== Niger Delta and Igbo ====
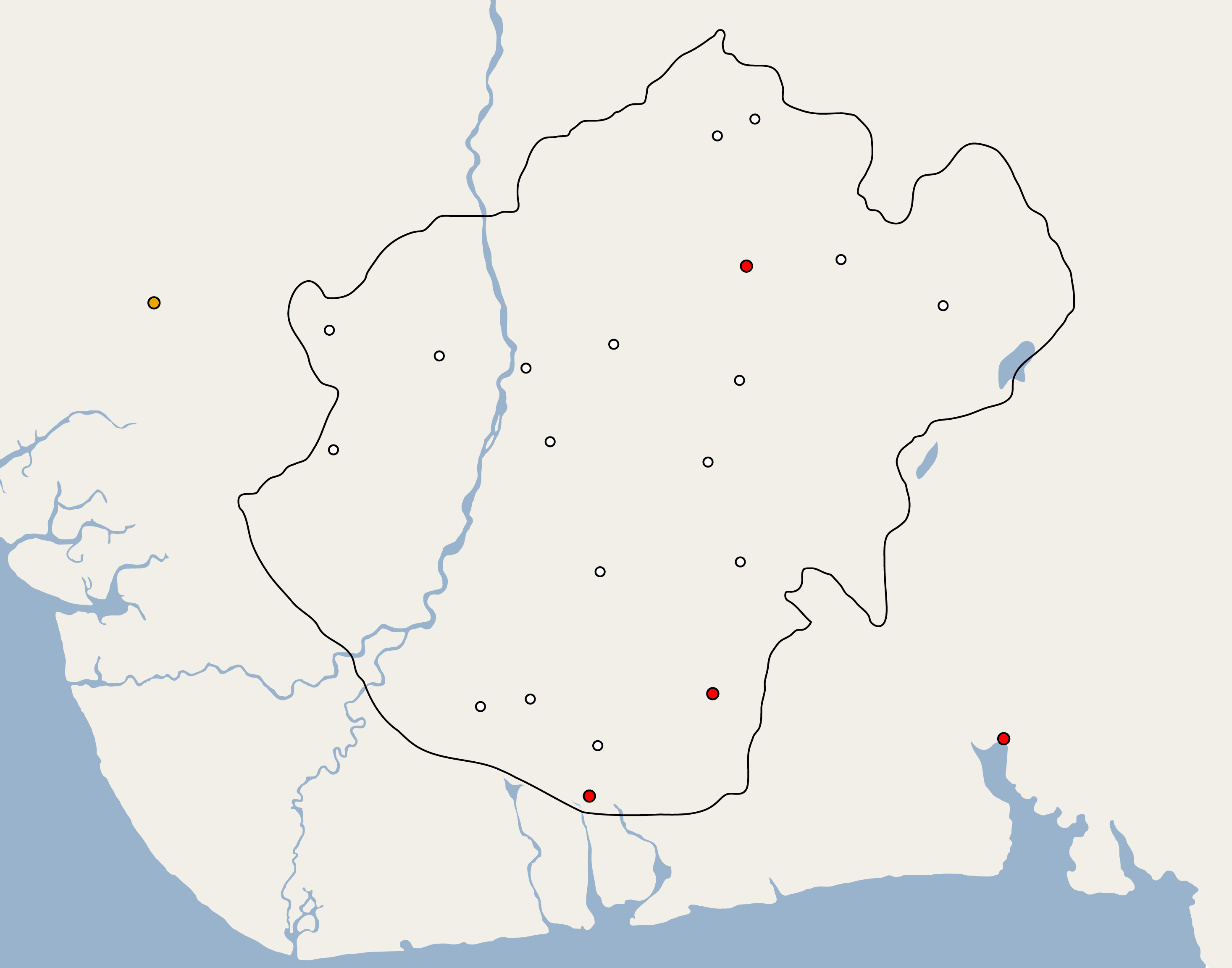

The Niger Delta comprised numerous city-states with numerous forms of government, comparable to those of the Swahili people in East Africa. These city-states were protected by the waterways and thick vegetation of the delta. Some, like Bonny, Kalabari, and Warri, had kings. Others, like Brass, were republics with small senates, and those at Cross River and Old Calabar were ruled by merchants of the ekpe society. The ekpe society regulated trade and made rules for members known as house systems. Some of these houses, like the Pepples of Bonny, were well known in the Americas and Europe. The region was transformed by trade in the 17th century CE.

The Igbo primarily lived east of the delta, with the exception of the Anioma on the west side of the delta. The Igbo Kingdom of Nri rose in the 10th century CE, with Eze Nri denoting its leader. It was a political entity composed of villages, where each village was autonomous, independent with its own territory and name, and recognised by its neighbours. Villages were democratic, with all males and sometimes females a part of the decision-making process. Graves at Igbo-Ukwu (800 CE) contained brass artefacts of local manufacture and glass beads from Egypt or India, indicative of extraregional trade.

The Aro Confederacy was a political union orchestrated by the Igbo subgroup, the Aro people, centered in the Arochukwu Kingdom in present-day south-eastern Nigeria. It was founded at the end of the 16th century, and by the 18th and 19th centuries their influence and presence reached across eastern Nigeria into parts of the Niger Delta and southern Igala.

=== Later migrations ===
Through pathways taken by caravan, or via travel amid the Almovarid period, a West African population (e.g., Sub-Saharan West Africans) may have introduced the −29 (A → G) β-thalassemia mutation—found in notable amounts among African-Americans—into the North African region of Morocco.

Painted rock art from Manding peoples are found largely in Mali, where Malinke and Bambara peoples reside. The Manding rock art, developed using black, white, or red paint, is primarily composed of geometric artforms, as well as animal (e.g., saurian) and human artforms. Some of the Manding rock art may relate to circumcision rituals for initiates. During the 15th century CE, migrations from the northern area of Guinea and southern area of Mali may have resulted in the creation of Manding rock art in the northern area of Mali (e.g., Yobri, Nabruk), southeastern area of Burkina Faso (e.g., Takoutala, Sourkoundingueye), and Dogon country.

=== Slave trade ===
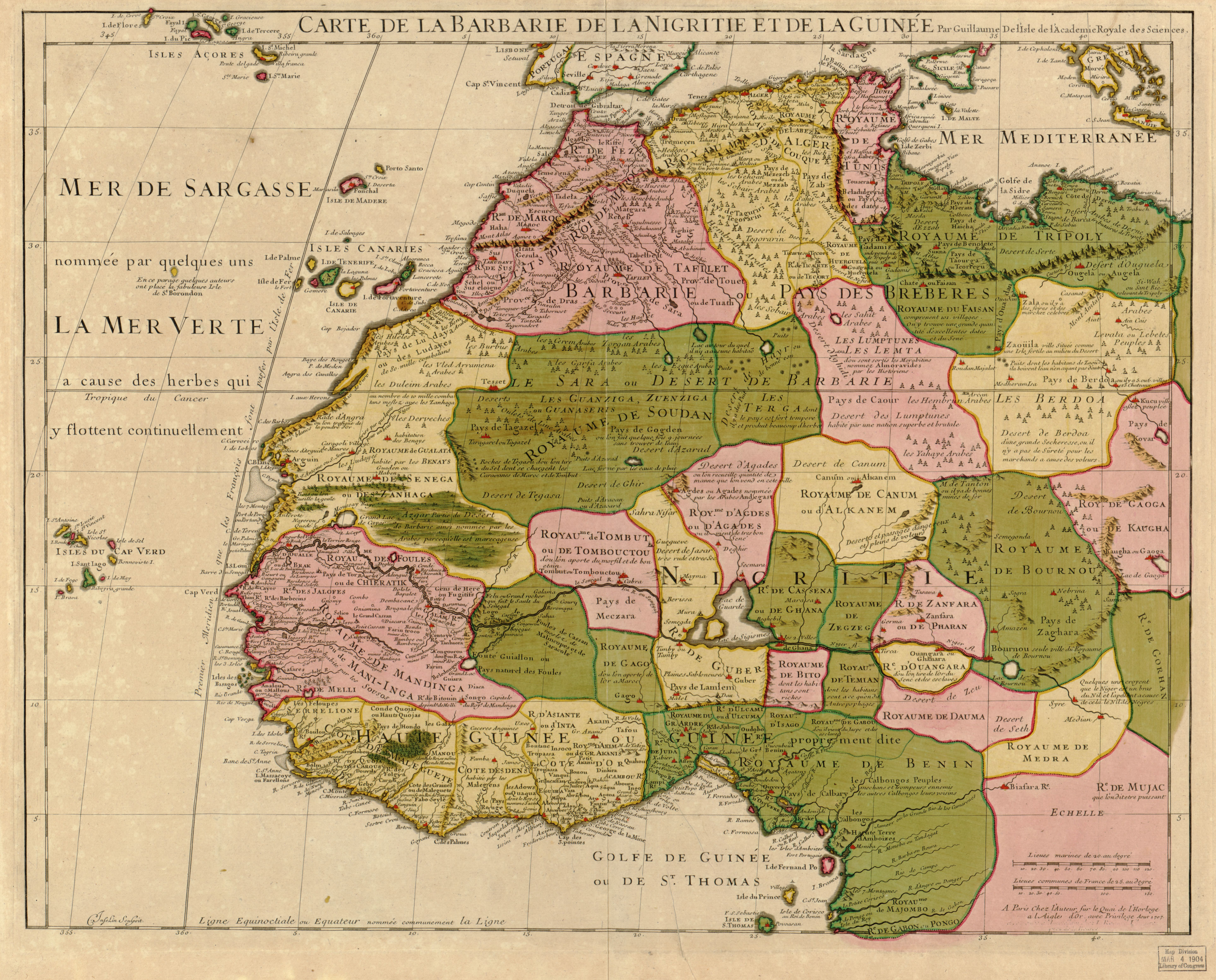
1707 map of West Africa, by Guillaume Delisle

Following the collapse of the Songhai Empire in the 16th century CE, a number of smaller states arose across West Africa, including the Bambara Empire of Ségou, the lesser Bambara kingdom of Kaarta, the Fula/Malinké kingdom of Khasso (in present-day Mali's Kayes Region), and the Kénédougou Empire of Sikasso.

European traders first became a force in the region in the 15th century, with the 1445 establishment of a Portuguese trading post at Arguin Island, off the coast of present-day Senegal. By 1475, Portuguese traders had reached as far as the Bight of Benin. The Atlantic slave trade began almost immediately after this, based on the already well-established slave trading capacity of the Islamic world, with the Portuguese taking hundreds of captives back to their country for use as slaves. It began on grand scale after Christopher Columbus' voyages to the Americas and the subsequent demand for cheap colonial labour. In 1510, the Spanish Crown initiated Spain's involvement in the Atlantic slave trade, and it was followed over the next centuries by other European states. By 1650, the slave trade was in full force at a number of sites along the coast of West Africa, and over the coming centuries would result in severely reduced growth for the region's population and economy. The expanding slave trade produced significant populations of West Africans living in the New World, recently colonised by Europeans. The oldest known remains of African slaves in the Americas were found in Mexico in early 2006 and are thought to date from the late-16th to mid-17th centuries.

As the demand for slaves increased, some African rulers sought to supply the demand by constant war against their neighbours, resulting in fresh captives. States such as Dahomey (in modern-day Benin) and the Bambara Empire (in modern-day Mali) based much of their economy on the exchange of slaves for European goods, particularly firearms that they then employed to capture more slaves. During the colonial era, the Dutch colonial authorities in West Africa were active in recruiting African slaves into the Royal Netherlands East Indies Army (known as Belanda Hitam), as it was believed that Black Africans were more immune than Europeans to the tropical diseases present in the Dutch East Indies. Recruitment changed format after the Atlantic slave trade was abolished by European and American governments in the 19th century. For instance, 1831 was the first year when only volunteers were accepted for the Royal Netherlands East Indies Army. Slavery in the Americas persisted in some capacity after the end of the Atlantic slave trade, until Brazil abolished it in 1888. Today, descendants of West Africans make up large and important segments of the population in Brazil, the Caribbean, the United States, and throughout the New World.

A modern genetic research study of African-Americans in several major US cities concluded that their common ancestry originated most prominently in western Africa, consistent with prior genetic studies and the history of the slave trade.

=== Colonial period ===
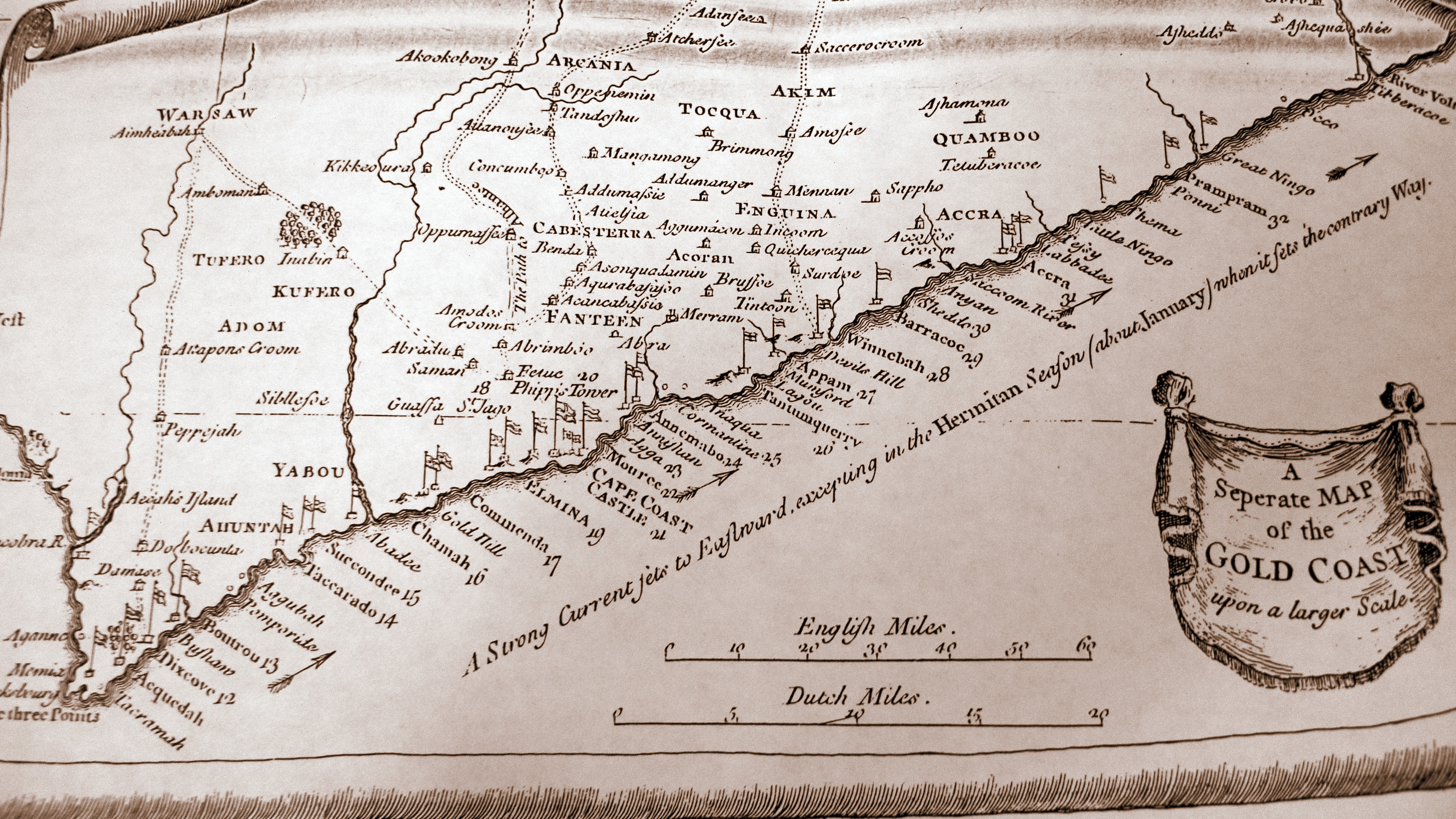
1774 map by Malachi Postlethwait

In 1725, the cattle-herding Fulanis of Fouta Djallon launched the first major reformist jihad of the region, overthrowing the local animist, Mandé-speaking elites and attempting to somewhat democratise their society. A similar movement occurred on a much broader scale in the Hausa city-states of Nigeria under Uthman dan Fodio. An imam influenced by the teachings of Sidi Ahmed al-Tidjani, Uthman preached against the elitist Islam of the then-dominant Qadiriyyah brotherhood, winning a broad base of support amongst the common people. Uthman's Fulani Empire was soon one of the region's largest states, and inspired the later jihads of Massina Empire founder Seku Amadu in present-day Mali, and the cross-Sudan Toucouleur conqueror El Hadj Umar Tall.

At the same time, the Europeans started to travel into the interior of Africa to trade and explore. Scottish explorer Mungo Park (1771–1806) made the first serious expedition into the region's interior, tracing the Niger River as far as Timbuktu. French armies followed not long after. In 1774 it was noted that the extensive coastline and deep rivers of Africa had not been utilised for "correspondence or commerce", even though maps in the same volume clearly show the "Gum Coast", "Grain Coast", "Ivory Coast", and "Gold Coast". Malachy Postlethwayt writes in this book,

It is melancholy to observe that a country, which has near ten thousand miles sea-coast, and noble, large, deep rivers, should yet have no navigation; streams penetrating into the very center of the country, but of no benefit to it, innumerable people, without knowledge of each other, correspondence, or commerce.

==== Scramble for Africa ====
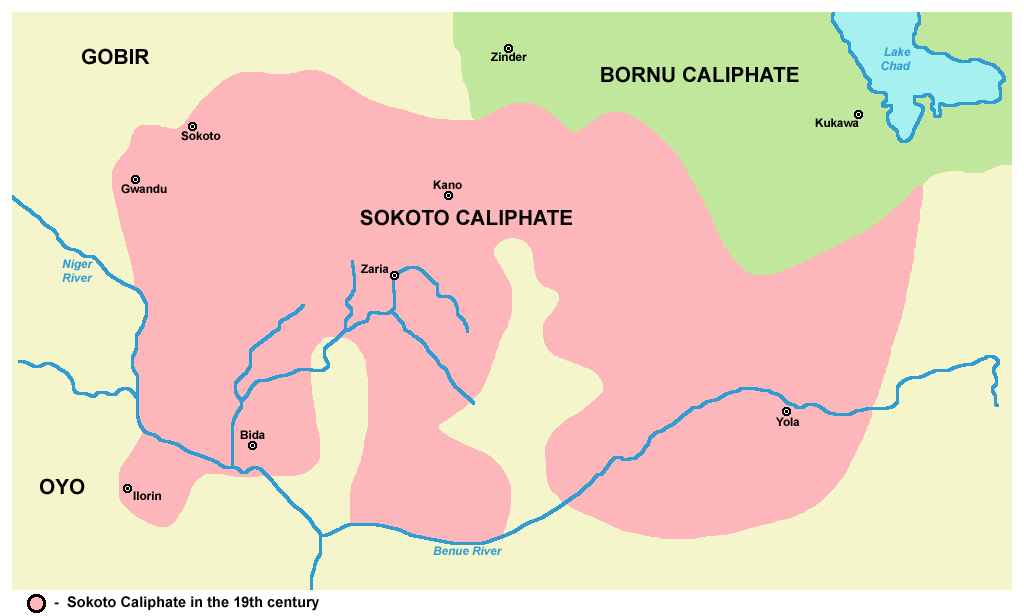
Sokoto Caliphate, 19th century

In the Scramble for Africa in the 1880s, Europeans started to colonise the inland of West Africa, as they had previously mostly controlled trading ports along the coasts and rivers. Samory Ture's newly founded Wassoulou Empire was the last to fall, and with his capture in 1898, military resistance to French colonial rule effectively ended.

France dominated West Africa, followed by Britain. Small colonial operations were held by Germany (until 1914), and also by Spain and Portugal. Only Liberia was independent before 1958. After the slave trade died out, Denmark and the Netherlands sold off their small holdings.

Britain operated from four small colonies on the West African coast: Sierra Leone, the Gold Coast, Lagos and the Niger. British trade in tropical products reached £4 million per year, and was entirely handled by a small number of resident merchants. There were no permanent British settlers or military bases. The posts were held entirely for trade purposes, and also as calling stations. London had no long-term plans to join them together or go inland. British diplomats negotiated military agreements with local tribes, who needed British protection from the expansionist Ashanti tribes. Britain fought repeated Anglo-Ashanti wars in the Gold Coast in 1823, 1824–1831, 1863–64, 1873–74, 1895–96 and 1900. Only the last two were clear British victories.

French pretensions in West Africa were much more ambitious, and involved not just trade, but rebuilding the French Empire and bringing new populations into the umbrella of French civilization and Catholicism. There were dreams of consolidating a vast African empire by expanding south from the Mediterranean into the Sahara desert, moving east toward the Nile River, and moving south toward King Leopold's Congo.

=== Post-colonial period ===
Following World War II, campaigns for independence sprang up across West Africa, most notably in Ghana under the Pan-Africanist Kwame Nkrumah (1909–1972). Ghana became the first country of Sub-Saharan Africa to achieve independence in 1957, followed by Guinea under the guidance of Sekou Touré the next year. After a decade of protests, riots, and clashes, French West Africa voted for autonomy in a 1958 referendum, dividing into the states of today. Most of the British colonies gained autonomy the following decade. Out of the 17 nations that achieved their independence in 1960, the Year of Africa, nine were West African countries. Many founding fathers of West African nations, like Nkrumah, Touré, Léopold Sédar Senghor, Modibo Keïta, Sylvanus Olympio, Félix Houphouët-Boigny, Siaka Stevens, and Abubakar Tafawa Balewa, consolidated their power during the post-independence 1960s by gradually eroding democratic institutions and civil society. In 1973, Guinea-Bissau proclaimed its independence from Portugal, and was internationally recognised following the 1974 Carnation Revolution in Portugal.

West African political history since independence has been characterised by African socialism. Senghor, Nkrumah, and Touré all embraced the idea of African socialism, whereas Houphouët-Boigny and Liberia's William Tubman remained suspicious of it. 1983 saw the rise of socialist Thomas Sankara, often titled the "Che Guevara of Africa", to power in Burkina Faso.

Since independence, West Africa has suffered from the same problems as much of the African continent, particularly dictatorships, political corruption, and military coups. At the time of his death in 2005, for example, Togo's Étienne Eyadéma was among the world's longest-ruling dictators. International conflicts have been few, with Mali and Burkina Faso's nearly bloodless Agacher Strip War a rare exception.

==== Civil wars ====
The region of West Africa has seen a number of civil wars in its recent past, including the Nigerian Civil War (1967–1970), two civil wars in Liberia (1989–1997 and 1999–2003), a decade of fighting in Sierra Leone (1991–2002), the Guinea-Bissau Civil War (1998–1999), and two recent conflicts in Ivory Coast (2002–2007 and 2010–2011).

==== Nigerian Civil War (1967–1970) ====
After gaining full independence from the British Empire in 1963, Nigeria established the First Republic, which was heavily influenced by British democracy and relied on majority rule. In less than three years, though, the Republic fell after a successful coup d'état led by southern Nigerian rebels on 15 January 1966.

The fall of the First Republic increased political, economic, ethnic, cultural, and religious tensions between North and South Nigeria which had been present since colonial times. This led to the military governor of south-eastern Nigeria, Colonel Chukwuemeka Odumegwu-Ojukwu, seceding south-eastern Nigeria, citing northern massacres and electoral fraud. The independent state became known as the Republic of Biafra.

Northern Nigeria opposed the claim of southern secession, and the Nigerian government called for police action in the area. The armed forces of Nigeria were sent in to occupy and take back the Republic of Biafra. Nigerian forces successfully seized Biafra through the Capture of Nsukka, the Capture of Ogoja, Capture of Abakaliki, and the Capture of Enugu. Their military successes were largely due to the advantaged army of Nigeria. By 1970, Biafraian General Chukwuemeka Odumegwu fled to the neighboring nation of Côte d'Ivoire, and Biafra surrendered due to lack of resources and leadership. The secessionist state officially reunited with the northern Nigeria on 15 January 1970. The conflict is estimated to have killed roughly 1 million people.

==== First Liberian Civil War (1989–1997) ====
The First Liberian Civil War was an internal conflict in Liberia from 1989 until 1997. The conflict killed about 250,000 people and eventually led to the involvement of the Economic Community of West African States (ECOWAS) and the United Nations. The peace did not last long, and in 1999 the Second Liberian Civil War broke out.

In 1980, Samuel Doe led a coup that overthrew the elected government. In 1985, he held elections that were widely considered fraudulent, leading to an unsuccessful coup attempt by General Thomas Quiwonkpa. In December 1989, former government minister Charles Taylor moved into the country from the neighboring Ivory Coast to start an uprising meant to topple the Doe government.

The National Patriotic Front of Liberia (NPFL), led by Taylor, soon splintered and devolved into battle with Prince Johnson's rebel group, the Independent National Patriotic Front of Liberia (INPFL) for control in the capital, Monrovia. In 1990, Johnson seized control of the capital and executed Doe brutally.

==== Second Liberian Civil War (1999–2003) ====
The Second Liberian Civil War began in 1999 when a rebel group backed by the government of neighbouring Guinea, the Liberians United for Reconciliation and Democracy (LURD), emerged in northern Liberia. In early 2003, a second rebel group, the Movement for Democracy in Liberia (MODEL), emerged in the south, and by June–July 2003, Charles Taylor's government controlled only a third of the country.

The capital Monrovia was besieged by LURD, and the group's shelling of the city resulted in the deaths of many civilians. Thousands of people were displaced from their homes as a result of the conflict.

The Accra Comprehensive Peace Agreement was signed by the warring parties on 18 August 2003, marking the political end of the conflict and the beginning of the country's transition to democracy under the National Transitional Government of Liberia, led by interim President Gyude Bryant until the Liberian general election of 2005.

==== Sierra Leone Civil War (1991–2002) ====
The civil war in Sierra Leone began on 23 March 1991 as a result of an attempted overthrow against the administration of president, Joseph Saidu Momoh. The rebels went under the guise of the Revolutionary United Front (RUF) led by Foday Sankoh a previous army corporal. The Sierra Leoneian government called for action and soon the Sierra Leone Army (SLA) was sent in to control the situation and take back RUF occupied territory.

By 1992 president Joseph Momoh was ousted by a successful military coup led by Captain Valentine Strasser. Capitan Strasser, soon established multi-party democratic elections in the region.

On 18 January 2002, the civil war was officially ended by former president Kabbah. During the 11 year conflict, roughly 50,000 Sierra Leoneians were killed with 2,000,000 displaced.

==== Guinea-Bissau Civil War (1998–1999) ====
Before the civil war began, an attempted coup d'état took place led by military Brigadier General Ansumane Mané. Mané leading the coup, blamed the presidency of Joao Bernardo Vieira for the poverty and corruption of Guinea Bissau. President Vieira, controlling the armed forces, soon fired Mané from his position of Brigadier General. He was fired on charges of supplying Senegal rebels.

On 7 June 1998, a second coup d'état began. The coup once again failed. Soon after, rebels received aid from the neighboring nations of Senegal and Guinea-Conakry.

The conflict sparked a civil war. Many soldiers in the armed forces of Guinea-Bissau joined the side of the rebels. This was in part, due to the government not paying its soldiers. The rebels continued to fight from 1998 to 1999. President Vieira was ousted on 7 May 1999. By 10 May 1999, the war ended when President Vieira signed an unconditional surrender in a Portuguese embassy.

Approximately 655 were killed as a result of the conflict.

==== First Ivorian Civil War (2002–2007) ====
In the early 2000s, the Ivory Coast (also known as Côte d'Ivoire) experienced an economic rescission. The rescission began as a result of the previous economic boom crashing the economy as a whole. This led to the predominantly Muslim north and predominantly Christian south of the Ivory Coast becoming politically divided.

The southern Ivory Coast was in control of the Ivorian government. The north was under the control of the rebel movement. The civil war between the two began officially on 19 September 2002 when rebels launched a series of attacks on the south. The city of Abidjan was primarily targeted. Northern rebels were successful in the attacks. As a result of the chaos, president Robert Guéï was killed in the rebellions.

The south retailed with military action. France supported the south and sent 2500 soldiers to the region and called for United Nations action. French action in the area went under the guise and codename of Opération Licorne.

By 2004 most fighting in the region ceased. On 4 March 2007 the civil war official ended with the signing of a peace treaty.

== Historiographic and conceptual problems ==
The current major problem in African studies that Mohamed (2010/2012) identified is the inherited religious, Orientalist, colonial paradigm that European Africanists have preserved in present-day secularist, post-colonial, Anglophone African historiography. African and African-American scholars also bear some responsibility in perpetuating this European Africanist preserved paradigm.

Following conceptualizations of Africa developed by Leo Africanus and Hegel, European Africanists conceptually separated continental Africa into two racialized regions – Sub-Saharan Africa and North Africa. Sub-Saharan Africa, as a racist geographic construction, serves as an objectified, compartmentalized region of "Africa proper", "Africa noire," or "Black Africa". The African diaspora is also considered to be a part of the same racialized construction as Sub-Saharan Africa. North Africa serves as a racialized region of "European Africa", which is conceptually disconnected from Sub-Saharan Africa, and conceptually connected to the Middle East, Asia, and the Islamic world.

As a result of these racialized constructions and the conceptual separation of Africa, darker skinned North Africans, such as the so-called Haratin, who have long resided in the Maghreb, and do not reside south of Saharan Africa, have become analogically alienated from their indigeneity and historic reality in North Africa. While the origin of the term "Haratin" remains speculative, the term may not date much earlier than the 18th century CE and has been involuntarily assigned to darker skinned Maghrebians. Prior to the modern use of the term Haratin as an identifier, and utilized in contrast to bidan or bayd (white), sumr/asmar, suud/aswad, or Sudan/sudani (black/brown) were Arabic terms utilized as identifiers for darker skinned Maghrebians before the modern period. "Haratin" is considered to be an offensive term by the darker skinned Maghrebians it is intended to identify; for example, people in the southern region (e.g., Wad Noun, Draa) of Morocco consider it to be an offensive term. Despite its questionable historicity and etymology, European colonialists and European Africanists have used the term Haratin as identifiers for groups of "black" and apparently "mixed" people found in Algeria, Mauritania, and Morocco.

The Saadian invasion of the Songhai Empire serves as the precursor to later narratives that grouped darker skinned Maghrebians together and identified their origins as Sub-Saharan West Africa. With gold serving as a motivation behind the Saadian invasion of the Songhai Empire, this made way for changes in latter behaviors toward dark-skinned Africans. As a result of changing behaviors toward dark-skinned Africans, darker skinned Maghrebians were forcibly recruited into the army of Ismail Ibn Sharif as the Black Guard, based on the claim of them having descended from enslaved peoples from the times of the Saadian invasion. Shurafa historians of the modern period would later utilize these events in narratives about the manumission of enslaved "Hartani" (a vague term, which, by merit of it needing further definition, is implicit evidence for its questionable historicity). The narratives derived from Shurafa historians would later become analogically incorporated into the Americanized narratives (e.g., the trans-Saharan slave trade, imported enslaved Sub-Saharan West Africans, darker skinned Magrebian freedmen) of the present-day European Africanist paradigm.

As opposed to having been developed through field research, the analogy in the present-day European Africanist paradigm, which conceptually alienates, dehistoricizes, and denaturalizes darker skinned North Africans in North Africa and darker skinned Africans throughout the Islamic world at-large, is primarily rooted in an Americanized textual tradition inherited from 19th century European Christian abolitionists. Consequently, reliable history, as opposed to an antiquated analogy-based history, for darker skinned North Africans and darker skinned Africans in the Islamic world are limited. Part of the textual tradition generally associates an inherited status of servant with dark skin (e.g., Negro labor, Negro cultivators, Negroid slaves, freedman). The European Africanist paradigm uses this as the primary reference point for its construction of origins narratives for darker skinned North Africans (e.g., imported slaves from Sub-Saharan West Africa). With darker skinned North Africans or darker skinned Africans in the Islamic world treated as an allegory of alterity, another part of the textual tradition is the trans-Saharan slave trade and their presence in these regions are treated as that of an African diaspora in North Africa and the Islamic world. Altogether, darker skinned North Africans (e.g., "black" and apparently "mixed" Maghrebians), darker skinned Africans in the Islamic world, the inherited status of servant associated with dark skin, and the trans-Saharan slave trade are conflated and modeled in analogy with African-Americans and the trans-Atlantic slave trade.

The trans-Saharan slave trade has been used as a literary device in narratives that analogically explain the origins of darker skinned North Africans in North Africa and the Islamic world. Camel trains have been equated with slave ships, and the amount of forcibly enslaved Africans transported across the Sahara are alleged to be numerically comparable to the considerably large amount of forcibly enslaved Africans transported across the Atlantic Ocean. The simulated narrative of comparable numbers is contradicted by the limited presence of darker skinned North Africans in the present-day Maghreb. As part of this simulated narrative, post-classical Egypt has also been characterized as having plantations. Another part of this simulated narrative is an Orientalist construction of hypersexualized Moors, concubines, and eunuchs. Concubines in harems have been used as an explanatory bridge between the allegation of comparable numbers of forcibly enslaved Africans and the limited amount of present-day darker skinned Maghrebians who have been characterized as their diasporic descendants. Eunuchs were characterized as sentinels who guarded these harems. The simulated narrative is also based on the major assumption that the indigenous peoples of the Maghreb were once purely white Berbers, who then became biracialized through miscegenation with black concubines (existing within a geographic racial binary of pale-skinned Moors residing further north, closer to the Mediterranean region, and dark-skinned Moors residing further south, closer to the Sahara). The religious polemical narrative involving the suffering of enslaved European Christians of the Barbary slave trade has also been adapted to fit the idea of a comparable number of enslaved Africans transported by Muslim slaver caravans, from the south of Saharan Africa, into North Africa and the Islamic world.

Despite inheriting 19th century religious polemical narratives, the use of race in the secularism of present-day European Africanist paradigm has given the paradigm an appearance of possessing scientific quality. The religious polemical narrative (e.g., holy cause, hostile neologisms) of 19th century European abolitionists about Africa and Africans are silenced, but still preserved, in the secularist narratives of the present-day European Africanist paradigm. The Orientalist stereotyped hypersexuality of the Moors were viewed by 19th century European abolitionists as deriving from the Quran. The reference to times prior, often used in concert with biblical references, by 19th century European abolitionists, may indicate that realities described of Moors may have been literary fabrications. The purpose of these apparent literary fabrications may have been to affirm their view of the Bible as greater than the Quran and to affirm the viewpoints held by the readers of their composed works. The adoption of 19th century European abolitionists' religious polemical narrative into the present-day European Africanist paradigm may have been due to its correspondence with the established textual tradition. The use of stereotyped hypersexuality for Moors are what 19th century European abolitionists and the present-day European Africanist paradigm have in common.

Due to a lack of considerable development in field research regarding enslavement in Islamic societies, this has resulted in the present-day European Africanist paradigm relying on unreliable estimates for the trans-Saharan slave trade. Insufficient data has also used as a justification for continued use of the faulty present-day European Africanist paradigm. Darker skinned Maghrebians, particularly in Morocco, have grown weary of the lack of discretion foreign academics have shown toward them, bear resentment toward the way they have been depicted by foreign academics, and consequently, find the intended activities of foreign academics to be predictable. Rather than continuing to rely on the faulty present-day European Africanist paradigm, Mohamed (2012) recommends revising and improving the current Africanist paradigm (e.g., critical inspection of the origins and introduction of the present characterization of the Saharan caravan; reconsideration of what makes the trans-Saharan slave trade, within its own context in Africa, distinct from the trans-Atlantic slave trade; realistic consideration of the experiences of darker-skinned Maghrebians within their own regional context).

Merolla (2017) had indicated that the academic study of Sub-Saharan Africa and North Africa by Europeans developed with North Africa was conceptually subsumed within the Middle East and Arab world, whereas the study of Sub-Saharan Africa was viewed as conceptually distinct from North Africa, and as its own region, viewed as inherently the same. The common pattern of conceptual separation of continental Africa into two regions and the view of conceptual sameness within the region of Sub-Saharan Africa has continued until present-day. Yet, with increasing exposure of this problem, discussion about the conceptual separation of Africa has begun to develop.

The Sahara had served as a trans-regional zone for peoples in Africa. Authors from various countries (e.g., Algeria, Cameroon, Sudan) in Africa have critiqued the conceptualization of the Sahara as a regional barrier, and provided counter-arguments supporting the interconnectedness of continental Africa; there are historic and cultural connections as well as trade between West Africa, North Africa, and East Africa (e.g., North Africa with Niger and Mali, North Africa with Tanzania and Sudan, major hubs of Islamic learning in Niger and Mali). Africa has been conceptually compartmentalized into meaning "Black Africa", "Africa South of the Sahara", and "Sub-Saharan Africa". North Africa has been conceptually "Orientalized" and separated from Sub-Saharan Africa. While its historic development has occurred within a longer time frame, the epistemic development (e.g., form, content) of the present-day racialized conceptual separation of Africa came as a result of the Berlin Conference and the Scramble for Africa.

In African and Berber literary studies, scholarship has remained largely separate from one another. The conceptual separation of Africa in these studies may be due to how editing policies of studies in the Anglophone and Francophone world are affected by the international politics of the Anglophone and Francophone world. While studies in the Anglophone world have more clearly followed the trend of the conceptual separation of Africa, the Francophone world has been more nuanced, which may stem from imperial policies relating to French colonialism in North Africa and Sub-Saharan Africa. As the study of North Africa has largely been initiated by the Arabophone and Francophone world, denial of the Arabic language having become Africanized throughout the centuries it has been present in Africa has shown that the conceptual separation of Africa remains pervasive in the Francophone world; this denial may stem from historic development of the characterization of an Islamic Arabia existing as a diametric binary to Europe. Among studies in the Francophone world, ties between North Africa and Sub-Saharan Africa have been denied or downplayed, while the ties (e.g., religious, cultural) between the regions and peoples (e.g., Arab language and literature with Berber language and literature) of the Middle East and North Africa have been established by diminishing the differences between the two and selectively focusing on the similarities between the two. In the Francophone world, construction of racialized regions, such as Black Africa (Sub-Saharan Africans) and White Africa (North Africans, e.g., Berbers and Arabs), has also developed.

Despite having invoked and utilized identities in reference to the racialized conceptualizations of Africa (e.g., North Africa, Sub-Saharan Africa) to oppose imposed identities, Berbers have invoked North African identity to oppose Arabized and Islamicized identities, and Sub-Saharan Africans (e.g., Negritude, Black Consciousness) and the African diaspora (e.g., Black is Beautiful) have invoked and utilized black identity to oppose colonialism and racism. While Berber studies has largely sought to be establish ties between Berbers and North Africa with Arabs and the Middle East, Merolla (2017) indicated that efforts to establish ties between Berbers and North Africa with Sub-Saharan Africans and Sub-Saharan Africa have recently started.

== Health ==
=== Medicine ===
Traditional African medicine is a holistic discipline involving indigenous herbalism and African spirituality. Practitioners claim to be able to cure various and diverse conditions. Modern science has, in the past, considered methods of traditional knowledge as primitive and backward. Under colonial rule, traditional diviner-healers were outlawed because they were considered by many nations to be practitioners of witchcraft and declared illegal by the colonial authorities, creating a war against witchcraft and magic. During this time, attempts were also made to control the sale of herbal medicines. As colonialism and Christianity spread through Africa, colonialists built general hospitals and Christian missionaries built private ones, with the hopes of making headway against widespread diseases. Little was done to investigate the legitimacy of these practices, as many foreigners believed that the native medical practices were pagan and superstitious and could only be suitably fixed by inheriting Western methods. During times of conflict, opposition has been particularly vehement as people are more likely to call on the supernatural realm. Consequently, doctors and health practitioners have, in most cases, continued to shun traditional practitioners despite their contribution to meeting the basic health needs of the population. In recent years, the treatments and remedies used in traditional African medicine have gained more appreciation from researchers in Western science. Developing countries have begun to realise the high costs of modern health care systems and the technologies that are required, thus proving Africa's dependence to it. Due to this, interest has recently been expressed in integrating traditional African medicine into the continent's national health care systems.

=== Disease ===
Disease has been a hindrance to human development in West Africa throughout history. The environment, especially the tropical rain-forests, allow many single cell organisms, parasites, and bacteria to thrive and prosper. Prior to the slave trade, West Africans strived to maintain ecological balance, controlling vegetation and game, and thereby minimising the prevalence of local diseases. The increased amount and intensity of warfare due to the slave trade meant that the ecological balance could not be sustained. Endemic diseases became epidemic in scale. Genetic mutations developed that provided increased resistance to disease, such as sickle cell, evident in the Kwa forest agriculturalists from c. 700 CE, providing some protection from malaria.

==== HIV/AIDS ====
In the 1990s, AIDS became a significant problem for the region, particularly in Côte d'Ivoire, Liberia, and Nigeria. The onset of the HIV epidemic in the region began in 1985 with reported cases in Benin and Nigeria, and in nearby countries, such as Côte d'Ivoire, in subsequent years.

AIDS was at first considered a disease of gay men and drug addicts, but in Africa it took off among the general population. As a result, those involved in the fight against HIV began to emphasize aspects such as preventing transmission from mother to child, or the relationship between HIV and poverty, inequality of the sexes, and so on, rather than emphasizing the need to prevent transmission by unsafe sexual practices or drug injection. This change in emphasis resulted in more funding, but was not effective in preventing a drastic rise in HIV prevalence. The global response to HIV and AIDS has improved considerably in recent years. Funding comes from many sources, the largest of which are the Global Fund to Fight AIDS, Tuberculosis and Malaria and the President's Emergency Plan for AIDS Relief.

As of 2011, HIV prevalence in western Africa is lowest in Senegal and highest in Nigeria, which has the second largest number of people living with HIV in Africa after South Africa. Nigeria's infection rate relative to the entire population is much lower (3.7 per cent) compared to South Africa's (17.3 per cent).

==== Ebola virus disease ====
Ebola virus disease, first identified in 1976, typically occurs in outbreaks in tropical regions of Sub-Saharan Africa, including West Africa. From 1976 through 2013, the World Health Organization reported 1,716 confirmed cases. The largest outbreak to date is the ongoing 2014 West Africa Ebola virus outbreak, which is affecting Guinea, Sierra Leone, Liberia and Nigeria The outbreak began in Guinea in December 2013, but was not detected until March 2014, after which it spread to Liberia, Sierra Leone, and Nigeria. The outbreak is caused by the Zaire ebolavirus, known simply as the Ebola virus (EBOV). It is the most severe outbreak of Ebola in terms of the number of human cases and fatalities since the discovery of the virus in 1976.

As of 16 August 2014, the World Health Organization (WHO) reported 2,240 suspected cases and 1,229 deaths (1,383 confirmed cases and 760 deaths). On 8 August, it formally designated the outbreak as a public health emergency of international concern. This is a legal designation used only twice before (for the 2009 H1N1 (swine flu) pandemic and the 2014 resurgence of polio) and invokes legal measures on disease prevention, surveillance, control, and response, by 194 signatory countries. Various aid organisations and international bodies, including the Economic Community of West African States (ECOWAS), US Centers for Disease Control and Prevention (CDC), and the European Commission have donated funds and mobilised personnel to help counter the outbreak; charities including Médecins Sans Frontières, the Red Cross, and Samaritan's Purse are also working in the area.

=== Famine ===
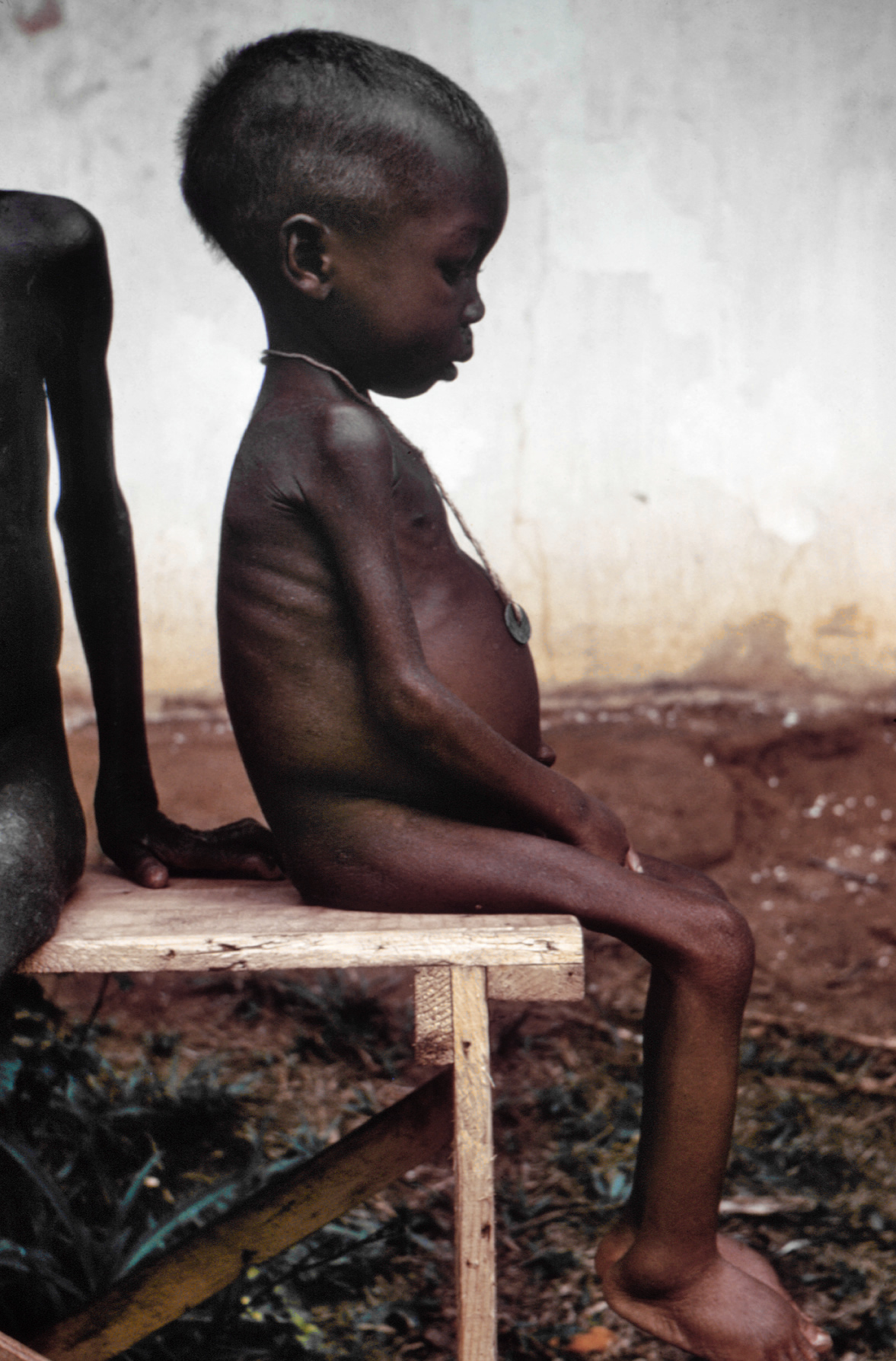
A girl during the Nigerian Civil War of the late 1960s. Pictures of the famine caused by Nigerian blockade garnered sympathy for the Biafrans worldwide.

Famine has been an occasional but serious problem in West Africa. In 1680s, famine extended across the entire Sahel, and in 1738 half the population of Timbuktu died of famine. Some colonial "pacification" efforts often caused severe famine. The introduction of cash crops such as cotton, and forcible measures to impel farmers to grow these crops, sometimes impoverished the peasantry in many areas, such as northern Nigeria, contributing to greater vulnerability to famine when severe drought struck in 1913. For the middle part of the 20th century, agriculturalists, economists and geographers did not consider Africa to be famine prone – most famines were localized and brief food shortages.

From 1967 to 1969 large scale famine occurred in Biafra and Nigeria due to a government blockade of the Breakaway territory. It is estimated that 1.5 million people died of starvation due to this famine. Additionally, drought and other government interference with the food supply caused 500 thousand Africans to perish in Central and West Africa. Famine recurred in the 1970s and 1980s, when the west African Sahel suffered drought and famine. The Sahelian famine was associated with the slowly growing crisis of pastoralism in Africa, which has seen livestock herding decline as a viable way of life over the last two generations.

Since the start of the 21st century, more effective early warning and humanitarian response actions have reduced the number of deaths by famine markedly. That said, many African countries are not self-sufficient in food production, relying on income from cash crops to import food. Agriculture in Africa is susceptible to climatic fluctuations, especially droughts which can reduce the amount of food produced locally. Other agricultural problems include soil infertility, land degradation and erosion, swarms of desert locusts, which can destroy whole crops, and livestock diseases. The Sahara spreads up to 30 miles per year. The most serious famines have been caused by a combination of drought, misguided economic policies, and conflict. Recent famines in Africa include the 2005–06 Niger food crisis, the 2010 Sahel famine, and in 2012, the Sahel drought put over ten million people in the western Sahel at risk of famine, according to the Methodist Relief and Development Fund, due to a month-long heatwave.

== Cuisine ==
West African peoples were trading with the Arab world centuries before the influence of Europeans. Spices such as cinnamon were introduced and became part of the local culinary traditions. Centuries later, European explorers and slave traders influenced regional cuisines to a limited extent. European merchant and slave ships brought chili peppers and tomatoes from the New World to West Africa, and both became ubiquitous components of West African cuisines, along with peanuts, maize, cassava, and plantains. In turn, these slave ships carried African ingredients to the New World, including black-eyed peas and okra.

Around the time of the colonial period, particularly during the Scramble for Africa, the European settlers defined colonial borders without regard to pre-existing borders, territories or cultural differences. This bisected tribes and created colonies with varying culinary styles. As a result, it is difficult to sharply define, for example, Senegalese cuisine. Although the European colonists brought many new ingredients to the African continent, they had relatively little impact on the way people cook in West Africa.

== Architecture ==
Further information in the sections of Architecture of Africa:

- Prehistoric West African Architecture
- Ancient West African Architecture
- Medieval West African Architecture

== Science and technology ==
Further information in the sections of History of science and technology in Africa:

- Education
- Astronomy
- Mathematics
- Metallurgy
- Medicine
- Agriculture
- Textiles
- Maritime technology
- Architecture
- Communication systems
- Warfare
- Commerce
- By country

== Genetics ==
=== Archaic human DNA ===
According to a 2020 study by Durvasula et al., there are indications that 2% to 19% (or about ≃6.6 and ≃7.0%) of the DNA of four West African populations may have come from an unknown archaic hominin which split from the ancestor of humans and Neanderthals between 360 kya to 1.02 mya. It also suggests that at least part of this archaic admixture is also present in Eurasians/non-Africans, and that the admixture event or events range from 0 to 124 ka B.P, which includes the period before the Out-of-Africa migration and prior to the African/Eurasian split (thus affecting in part the common ancestors of both Africans and Eurasians/non-Africans).

Archaic traits found in human fossils of West Africa (e.g., Iho Eleru fossils, which dates to 13,000 BP) and Central Africa (e.g., Ishango fossils, which dates between 25,000 BP and 20,000 BP) may have developed as a result of admixture between archaic humans and modern humans or may be evidence of late-persisting early modern humans. While Denisovan and Neanderthal ancestry in non-Africans outside of Africa are more certain, archaic human ancestry in Africans is less certain and is too early to be established with certainty.

=== Ancient DNA ===
As of 2017, human ancient DNA has not been found in the region of West Africa. As of 2020, human ancient DNA has not been forthcoming in the region of West Africa.

West African hunter-gatherers, in the region of western Central Africa (e.g., Shum Laka, Cameroon), particularly between 8000 BP and 3000 BP, were found to be related to modern Central African hunter-gatherers (e.g., Baka, Bakola, Biaka, Bedzan).

In 4000 BP (or even earlier during the Mesolithic), there may have been a population that traversed from Africa (e.g., West Africa or West-Central Africa), through the Strait of Gibraltar, into the Iberian peninsula, where admixing between Africans and Iberians (e.g., of northern Portugal, of southern Spain) occurred. Based on a small trace presence of sub-Saharan African components in select samples from Iberia, and the discovery of a mitogenome L2a1 found in one individual, while all others belonged to European mitochondrial haplogroups.

In Granada, a Muslim (Moor) of the Cordoba Caliphate, who was of haplogroups E1b1a1 and H1+16189, as well as estimated to date between 900 CE and 1000 CE, and a Morisco, who was of haplogroup L2e1, as well as estimated to date between 1500 CE and 1600 CE, were both found to be of Sub-Saharan West African (i.e., Gambian) and Iberian descent.

=== Y-chromosomal DNA ===
Eight males from Guinea Bissau, two from Niger, one from Mali and one from Cabo Verde carried haplogroup A1a.

As haplogroup D0, a basal branch of haplogroup DE, was found in three Nigerian men, haplogroup DE may have originated in Africa.

As of 19,000 years ago, Africans, bearing haplogroup E1b1a-V38, likely traversed across the Sahara, from east to west. E1b1a1-M2 likely originated in West Africa or Central Africa.

Due to the large numbers of West Africans enslaved in the Atlantic slave trade, most African Americans, Afro Latin Americans and Afro-Caribbean people are likely to have mixed ancestry from different regions of western Africa. 60% of African-Americans (in the study) were of the E1b1a haplogroup, within which 22.9% were particularly of the E-M2 haplogroup; they also possessed numerous SNPs (e.g., U175, U209, U181, U290, U174, U186, and U247).

=== Mitochondrial DNA ===
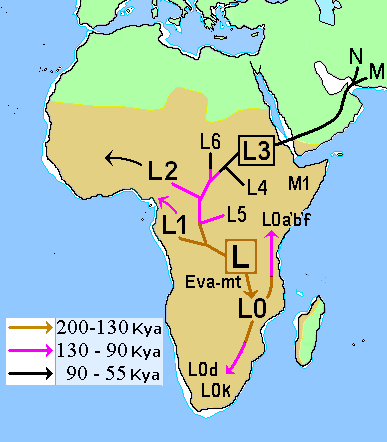
Map of early diversification of modern humans, with haplogroup L2 entering West Africa.

Studies of human mitochondrial DNA suggest that all humans share common ancestors from Africa, originated in the southwestern regions near the coastal border of Namibia and Angola at the approximate coordinates 12.5° E, 17.5°S with a divergence in the migration path around 37.5°E, 22.5°N near the Red Sea.

A particular haplogroup of DNA, L2, evolved between 87,000 and 107,000 years ago or approx. 90,000 YBP. Its age and widespread distribution and diversity across the continent makes its exact origin point within Africa difficult to trace with any confidence. An origin for several L2 groups in West or Central Africa seems likely, with the highest diversity in West Africa. Most of its subclades are largely confined to West and western-Central Africa.

Between 75,000 BP and 60,000 BP, Africans bearing haplogroup L3 emerged in East Africa and eventually migrated into and became present in modern West Africans, Central Africans, and non-Africans.

During the early period of the Holocene, 50% of Sub-Saharan African mitochondrial DNA was introduced into North Africa by West Africans and the other 50% was introduced by East Africans. During the modern period, a greater number of West Africans introduced Sub-Saharan African mitochondrial DNA into North Africa than East Africans. During the early period of the Holocene, Sub-Saharan African mitochondrial DNA was introduced into Europe, mostly in Iberia. West Africans probably migrated, across Sahelian Africa, North Africa, and the Strait of Gibraltar, into Europe, and introduced 63% of Sub-Saharan African mitochondrial DNA. During the modern period, West Africans introduced 75% of Sub-Saharan African mitochondrial DNA into Iberia and other parts of Europe, possibly by sea voyage.

Around 18,000 BP, Mende people, along with Gambian peoples, grew in population size.

In 15,000 BP, Niger-Congo speakers may have migrated from the Sahelian region of West Africa, along the Senegal River, and introduced haplogroup L2a1 into North Africa, resulting in modern Mauritanian peoples and Berbers of Tunisia inheriting it.

Between 15,000 BP and 7000 BP, 86% of Sub-Saharan African mitochondrial DNA was introduced into Southwest Asia by East Africans, largely in the region of Arabia, which constitute 50% of Sub-Saharan African mitochondrial DNA in modern Southwest Asia. In the modern period, 68% of Sub-Saharan African mitochondrial DNA was introduced by East Africans and 22% was introduced by West Africans, which constitutes 50% of Sub-Saharan African mitochondrial DNA in modern Southwest Asia.

Between 11,000 BP and 10,000 BP, Yoruba people and Esan people grew in population size.

As early as 11,000 years ago, Sub-Saharan West Africans, bearing macrohaplogroup L (e.g., L1b1a11, L1b1a6a, L1b1a8, L1b1a9a1, L2a1k, L3d1b1a), may have migrated through North Africa and into Europe, mostly into southern Europe (e.g., Iberia).

Amid the Holocene, including the Holocene Climate Optimum in 8000 BP, Africans bearing haplogroup L2 spread within West Africa and Africans bearing haplogroup L3 spread within East Africa. As the largest migration since the Out of Africa migration, migration from Sub-Saharan Africa toward the North Africa occurred, by West Africans, Central Africans, and East Africans, resulting in migrations into Europe and Asia; consequently, Sub-Saharan African mitochondrial DNA was introduced into Europe and Asia.

=== Autosomal DNA ===
During the early period of the Holocene, in 9000 BP, Khoisan-related peoples admixed with the ancestors of the Igbo people, possibly in the western Sahara.

Between 2000 BP and 1500 BP, Nilo-Saharan-speakers may have migrated across the Sahel, from East Africa into West Africa, and admixed with Niger-Congo-speaking Berom people. In 710 CE, West African-related populations (e.g., Niger-Congo-speaking Berom people, Bantu-speakers) and East African-related populations (Nilo-Saharan-speaking Ethiopians, Nilo-Saharan-speaking Chadians) admixed with one another in northern Nigeria and northern Cameroon.

=== Medical DNA ===
The genomes of Africans commonly found to undergo adaptation are regulatory DNA, and many cases of adaptation found among Africans relate to diet, physiology, and evolutionary pressures from pathogens. Throughout Sub-Saharan Africa, genetic adaptation (e.g., rs334 mutation, Duffy blood group, increased rates of G6PD deficiency, sickle cell disease) to malaria has been found among Sub-Saharan Africans, which may have initially developed in 7300 BP. Sub-Saharan Africans have more than 90% of the Duffy-null genotype.

==== Pediculus ====
During the Copper Age and early Islamic era of ancient Israel, West Africans may have migrated into ancient Israel and introduced head louse from West Africa.

==== Sickle cells ====
Amid the Green Sahara, the mutation for sickle cells originated in the Sahara or in the northwest forest region of western Central Africa (e.g., Cameroon) by at least 7,300 years ago, though possibly as early as 22,000 years ago. The ancestral sickle cell haplotype to modern haplotypes (e.g., Cameroon/Central African Republic and Benin/Senegal haplotypes) may have first arose in the ancestors of modern West Africans, bearing haplogroups E1b1a1-L485 and E1b1a1-U175 or their ancestral haplogroup E1b1a1-M4732. West Africans (e.g., Yoruba and Esan of Nigeria), bearing the Benin sickle cell haplotype, may have migrated through the northeastern region of Africa into the western region of Arabia. West Africans (e.g., Mende of Sierra Leone), bearing the Senegal sickle cell haplotype, may have migrated into Mauritania (77% modern rate of occurrence) and Senegal (100%); they may also have migrated across the Sahara, into North Africa, and from North Africa, into Southern Europe, Turkey, and a region near northern Iraq and southern Turkey. Some may have migrated and introduced the Senegal and Benin sickle cell haplotypes into Basra, Iraq, where both occur equally. West Africans, bearing the Benin sickle cell haplotype, may have migrated into the northern region of Iraq (69.5%), Jordan (80%), Lebanon (73%), Oman (52.1%), and Egypt (80.8%).

==== Schistosomes ====
According to Steverding (2020), while not definite: Near the African Great Lakes, schistosomes (e.g., S. mansoni, S. haematobium) underwent evolution. Subsequently, there was an expansion alongside the Nile River. From Egypt, the presence of schistosomes may have expanded, via migratory Yoruba people, into Western Africa. Thereafter, schistosomes may have expanded, via migratory Bantu peoples, into the rest of Sub-Saharan Africa (e.g., Southern Africa, Central Africa).

==== Thalassemia ====
Through pathways taken by caravan, or via travel amid the Almovarid period, a population (e.g., Sub-Saharan West Africans) may have introduced the −29 (A → G) β-thalassemia mutation (found in notable amounts among African-Americans) into the North African region of Morocco.

=== Domesticated animal DNA ===
Niger-Congo migration may have been from Kordofan, Sudan into West Africa or West Africa into Kordofan. Possibly from Kordofan, Niger-Congo speakers accompanied by undomesticated helmeted guineafowls, may have traversed into West Africa, domesticated the helmeted guineafowls by 3000 BCE, and via the Bantu expansion, traversed into other parts of Sub-Saharan Africa (e.g., Central Africa, East Africa, Southern Africa).

== Timeline of archaeological cultures and sites ==
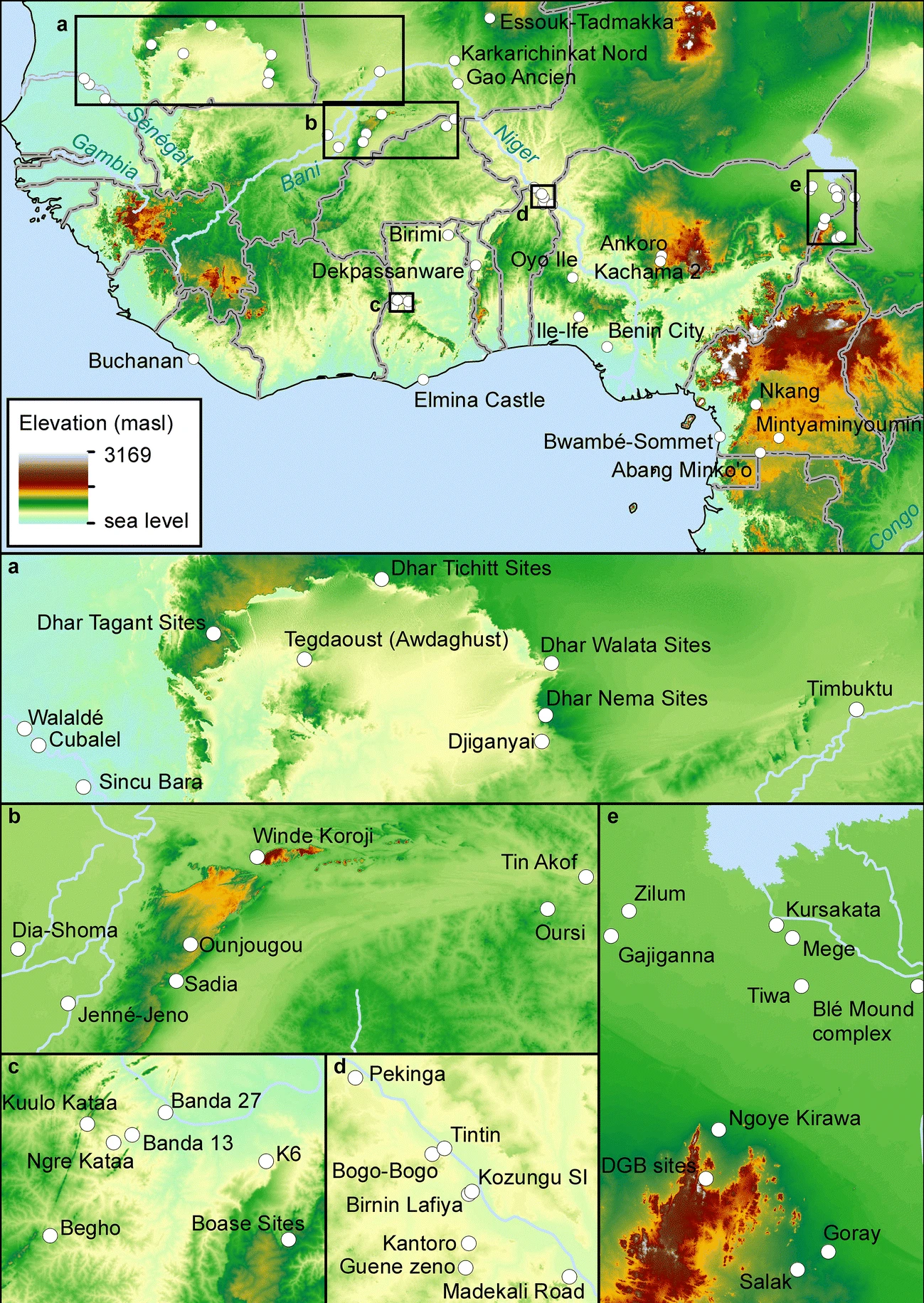
Topographic map showing locations and rivers of Western Africa

- Ounjougou (Middle Pleistocene)
- Ugwuele (1,600,000 BP - 95,000 BP)

- Ngodo

- Mousteroid (30,000 BP)
- Bingerville (13,000 BP)
- Bosumpra Cave (11th millennium BCE)
- Iwo Eleru Rockshelter (11,000 BP)

- Iwo Eleru Skull

- Kiffian Culture (8400 BCE)

- Gobero

- Ifetedo Rockshelter (9000/7000 BP)
- Dutsen Kongba Rockshelter (6th millennium BCE)
- Konduga (6300 BP)
- Ita Ogbolu Rockshelter (5000/2000 BP)
- Kagoro Rockshelter (5000/2000 BP)
- Tenerian Culture (4300 BCE - 2400 BCE)

- Adrar Bous

- Yengema Cave (2560 BCE)
- Kamabai Rockshelter (2560 BCE)
- Kintampo Complex (2500 BCE - 1400 BCE)

- Birimi

- Karkarichinkat (4500/4200 BP)
- Rim (4000 BP)
- Dhar Tichitt (2000 BCE - 500 BCE)

- Tichitt

- Dhar Walata (2000 BCE – 500 BCE)

- Walata

- Dhar Nema (2000 BCE - 800 BCE)
- Daima (2nd millennium BCE – 16th/17th century CE)
- Sekkiret (2nd millennium BCE)
- Lejja (2000 BCE)
- Gajiganna (1800 BCE - 800 BCE)
- Nok Culture (1500 BCE – 1 BCE)

- Kagara
- Katsina-Ala
- Samun Dukiya
- Taruga

- Yagala Rockshelter (1070 BCE)
- Mouhoun Bend (1st millennium BCE)
- Kissi (1st millennium BCE – 13th century CE)
- Azelik (1st millennium BCE)
- Dia (9th century BCE)
- Walalde (800 BCE)
- Kursakata (800 BCE)
- Zilum (7th/5th century BCE)
- Opi (5th century BCE)
- Senegambian Stone Circles (3rd century BCE – 16th century CE)
- Itaakpa Rockshelter (271 BCE)
- Djenne-Djenno (250 BCE – 1100 CE)
- Afikpo Rockshelter (105 BCE)
- Akjoujt (1st century BCE)
- Rop Rockshelter (25 BCE)
- Kirikongo (100 CE - 1700 CE)
- Hambarketolo (300 CE - 1000 CE)
- Bura Culture (3rd century CE - 13th century CE)

- Bura

- Birnin Lafiya (4th century CE – 13th century CE)
- Ifẹ (4th century CE – 15th century CE)
- Niani (6th/10th century CE)
- Tondidarou (635/670 CE)
- Gao (700 CE)
- Tegdaoust (810 CE – 1800 CE)
- Chinguetti (8th century CE)
- Tissalaten (8th century CE – 11th century CE)
- Toyla (890/980 CE)
- Igbo-Ukwu (9th century CE)
- Koumbi Saleh (9th century CE – 15th century CE)
- Kawinza (950/715 CE)
- Begho (1000 CE)
- Walls of Benin (1st millennium CE)
- Sungbo's Eredo (10th century CE)
- Diouboye (1000 CE – 1400 CE)
- Azugi (11th century CE)
- Cekeen Tumuli (11th century CE)
- Ouadane (11th/12th century CE)
- Bandiagara Escarpment (11th century CE – 13th century CE)
- Ruins of Loropeni (11th century CE – 17th century CE)
- Ma'adin Ijafen (1170/1260 CE)
- Kwiambana (1260 CE)
- Mejiro Rockshelter (1300 CE)
- Benin (13th century CE)
- Durbi Takusheyi (14th century CE – 16th century CE)
- Agbaku Rockshelter (1403 CE)
- Bono Manso (1420 CE)
- Sidi Yahya Mosque (1440 CE)
- Ngazargamu (1488 CE)
- Bonduku (1586 CE)
- Agongointo-Zoungoudo Underground Town (16th century CE)
- Ksar El Barka (1690 CE)
- Jenini (1870 CE – 1895 CE)

=== Food production lifeways maps ===
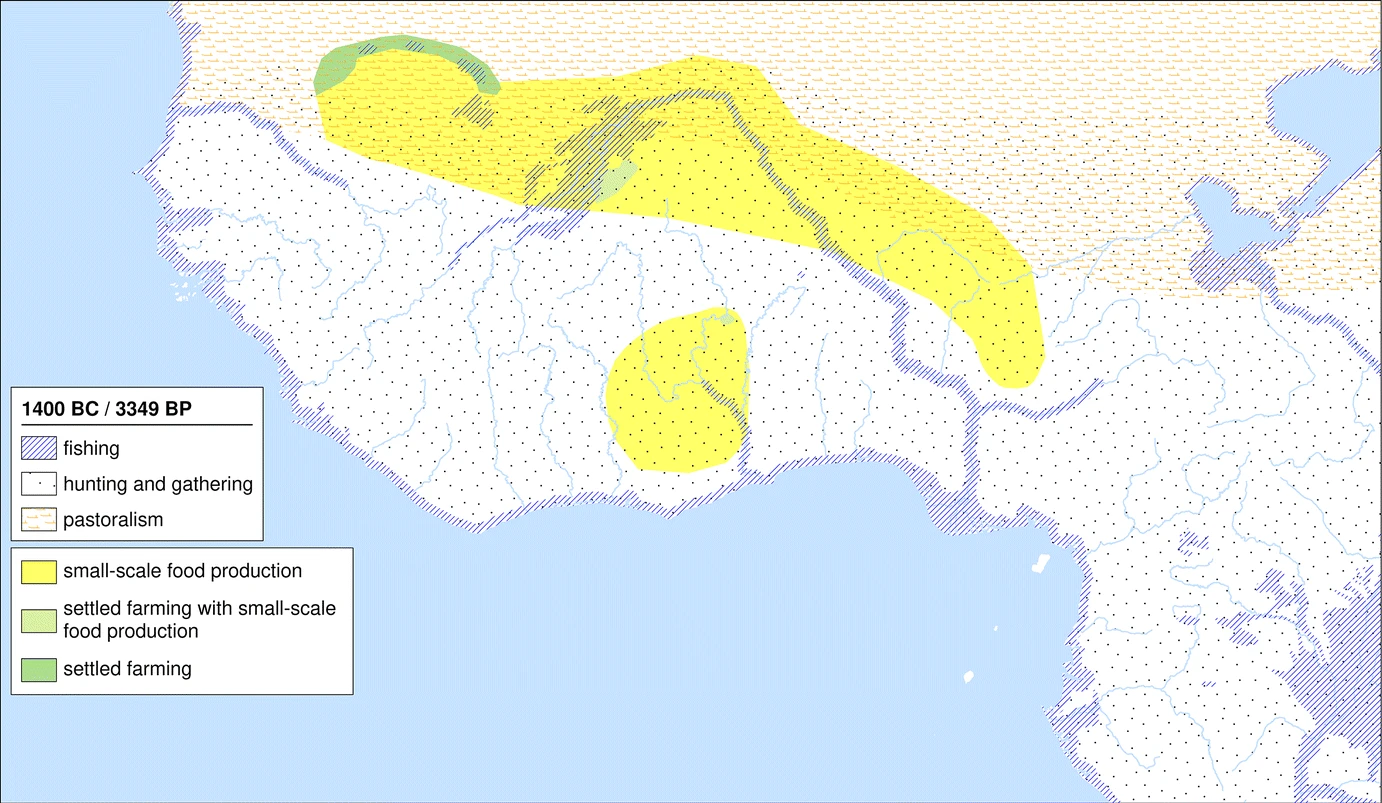
Map of livelihood distributions in 1400 BCE Western Africa

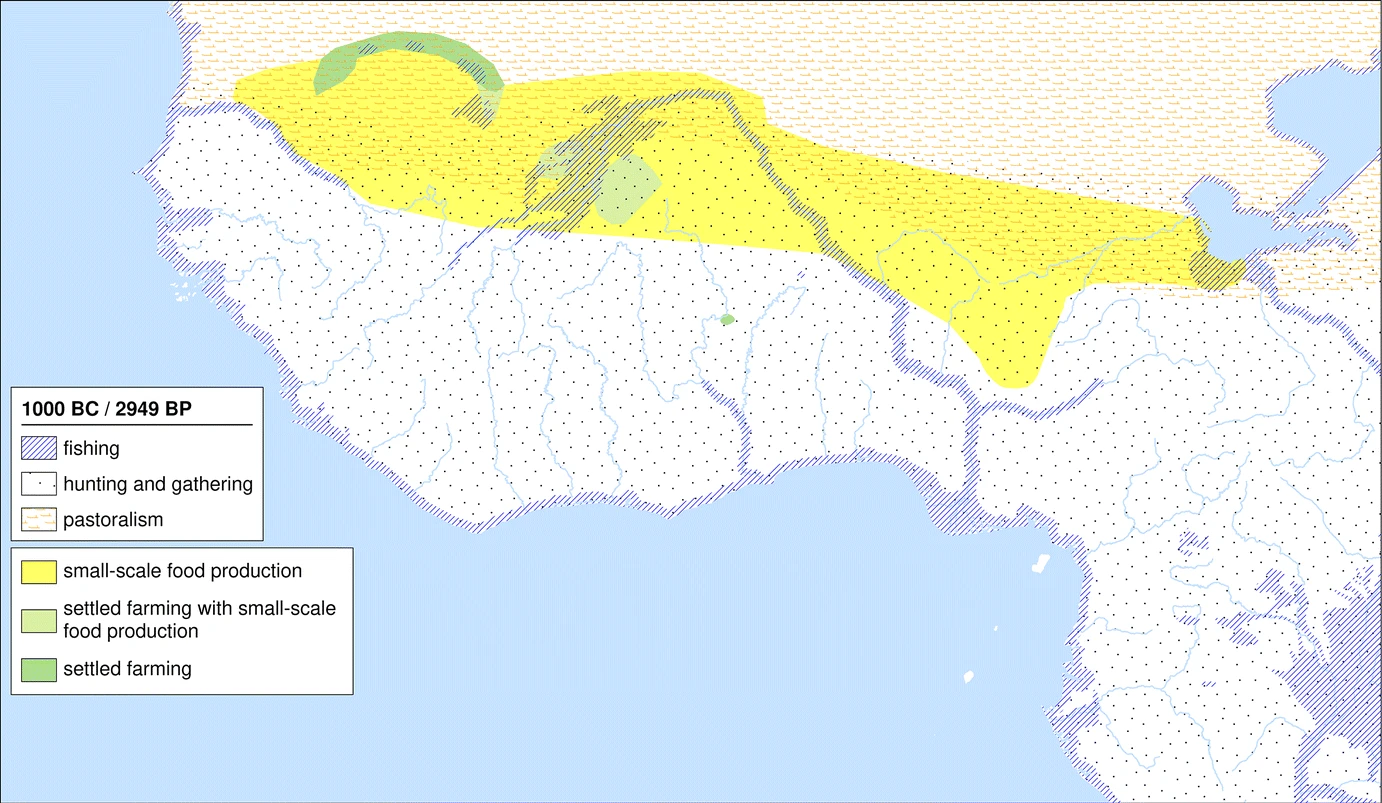
Map of livelihood distributions in 1000 BCE Western Africa

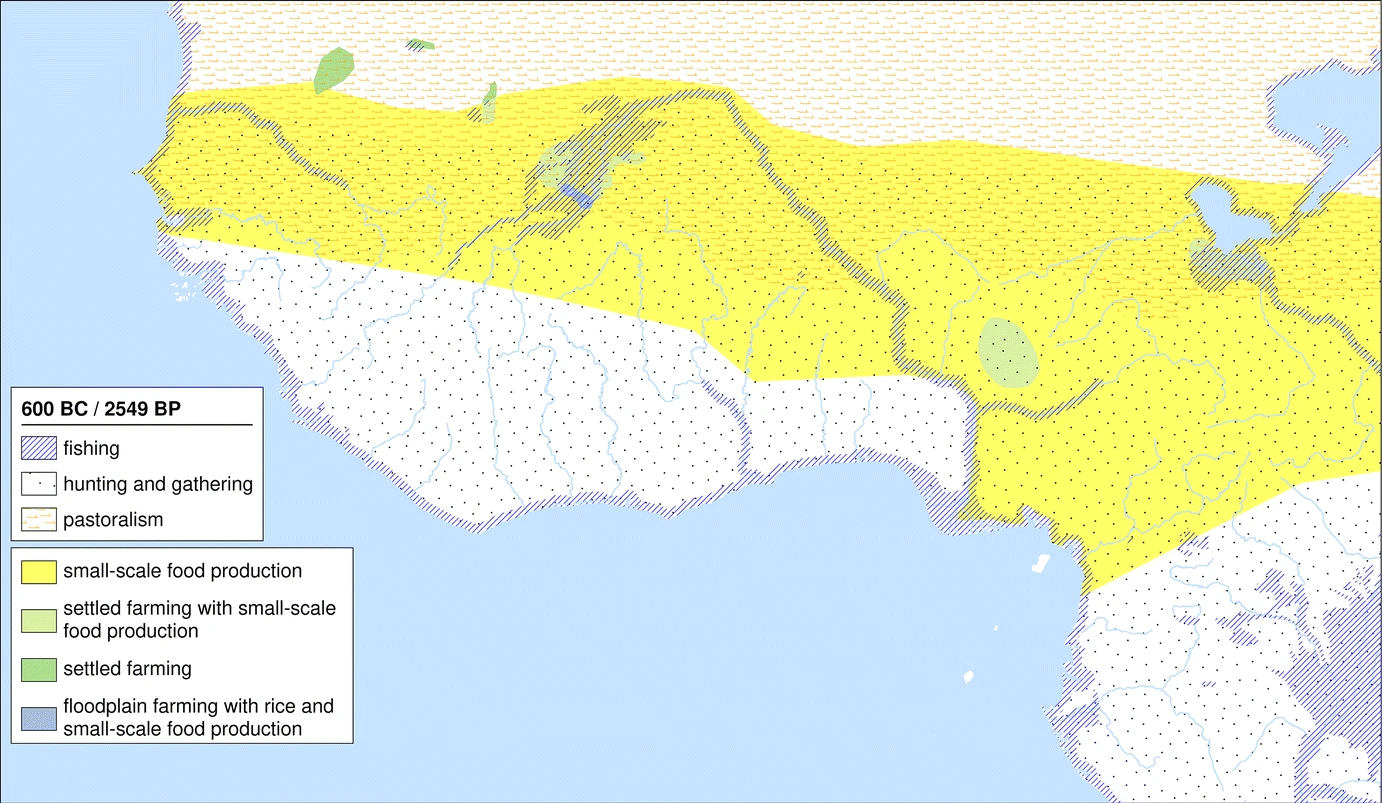
Map of livelihood distributions in 600 BCE Western Africa

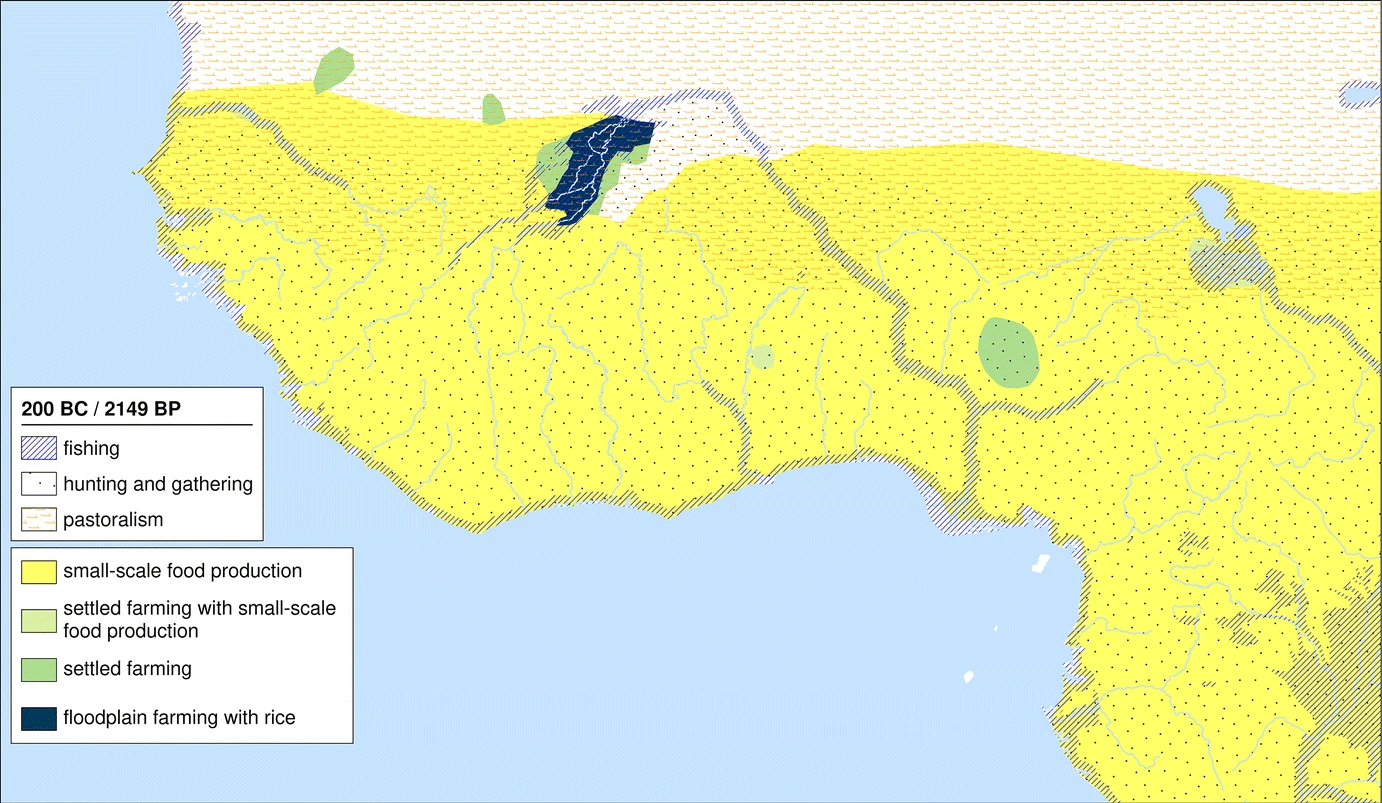
Map of livelihood distributions in 200 BCE Western Africa

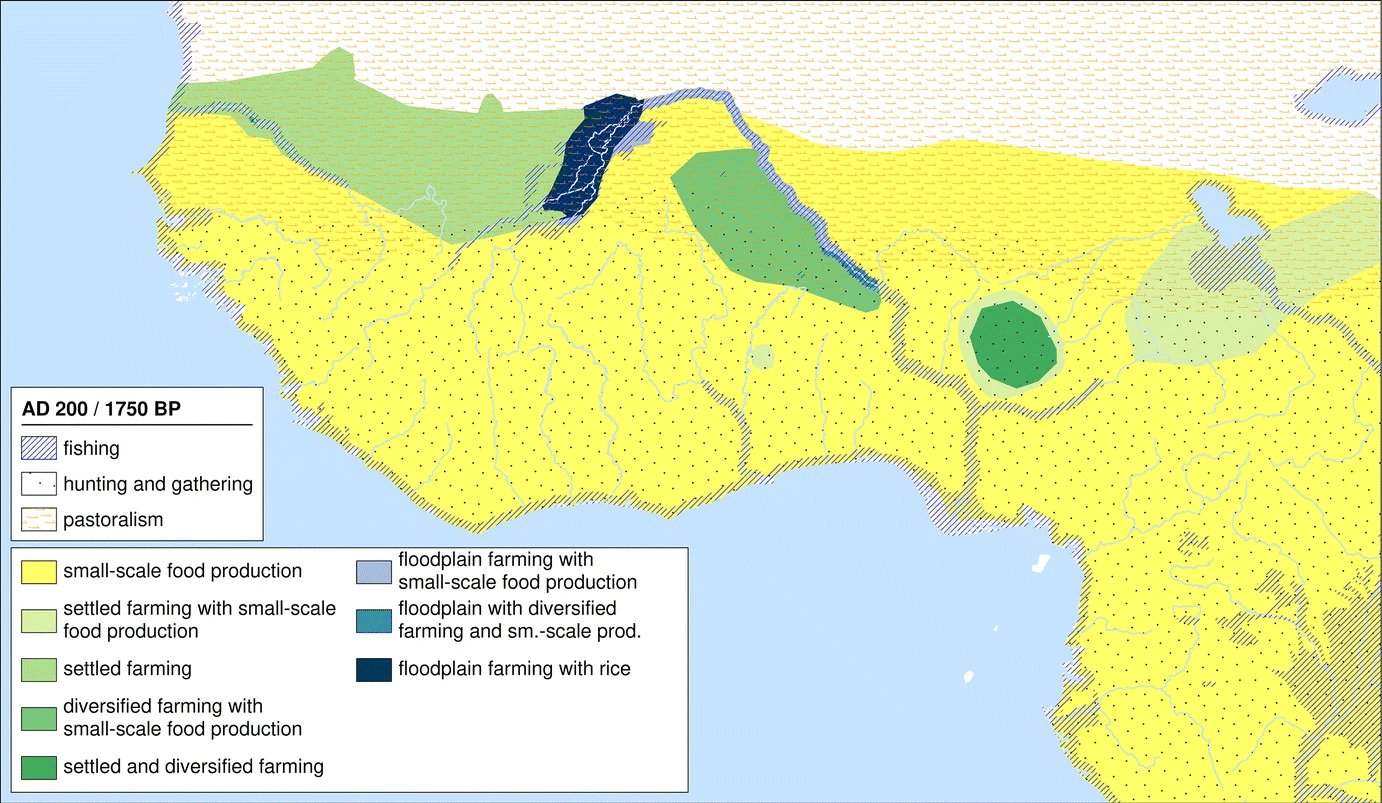
Map of livelihood distributions in 200 CE Western Africa

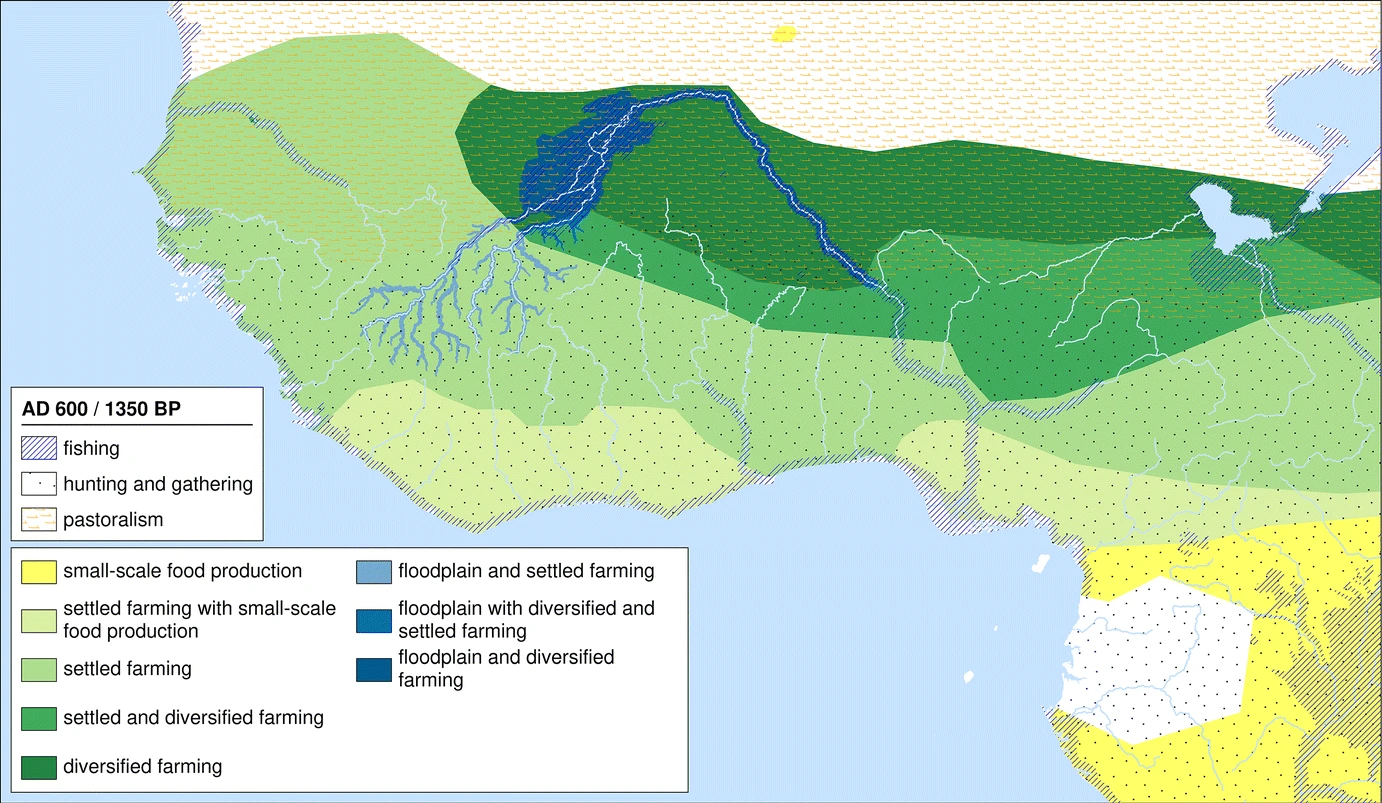
Map of livelihood distributions in 600 CE Western Africa

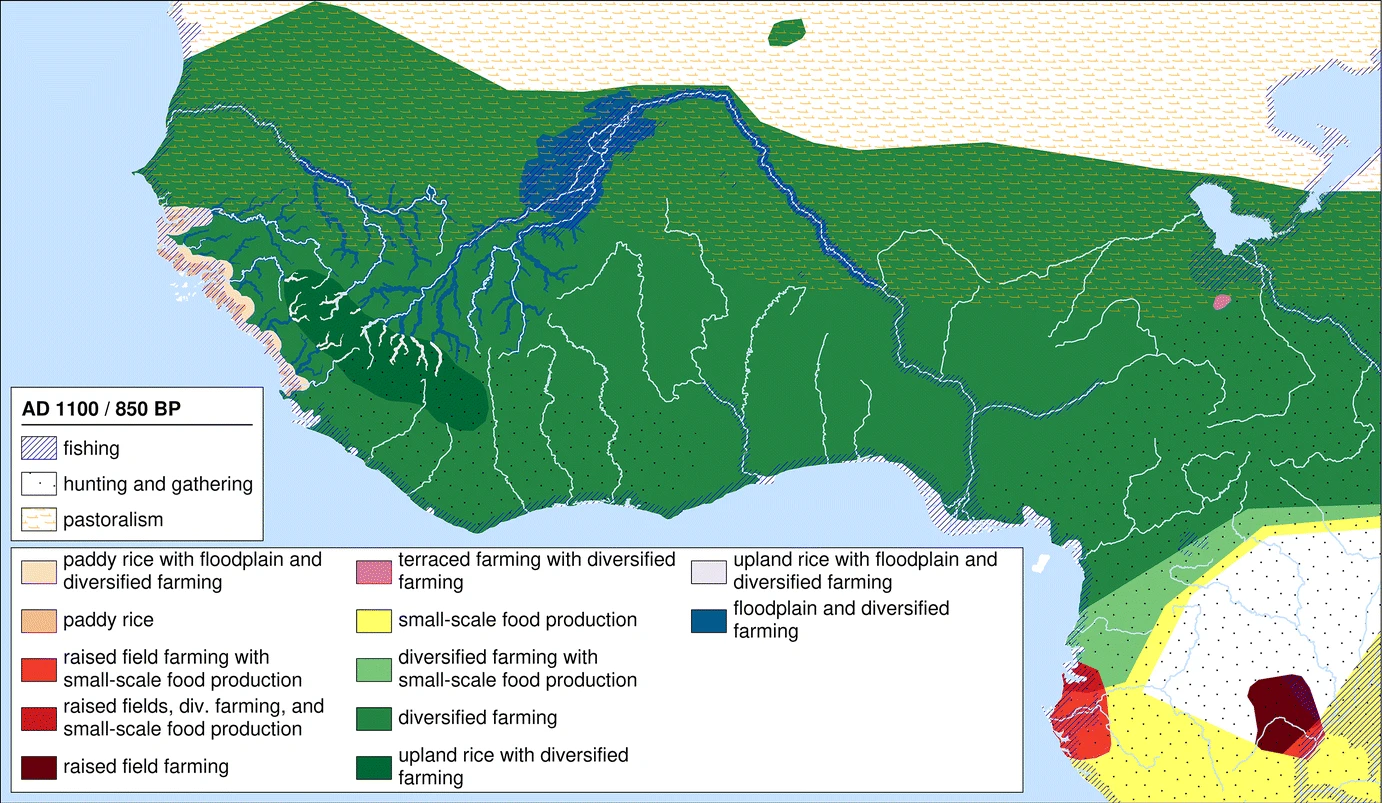
Map of livelihood distributions in 1100 CE Western Africa

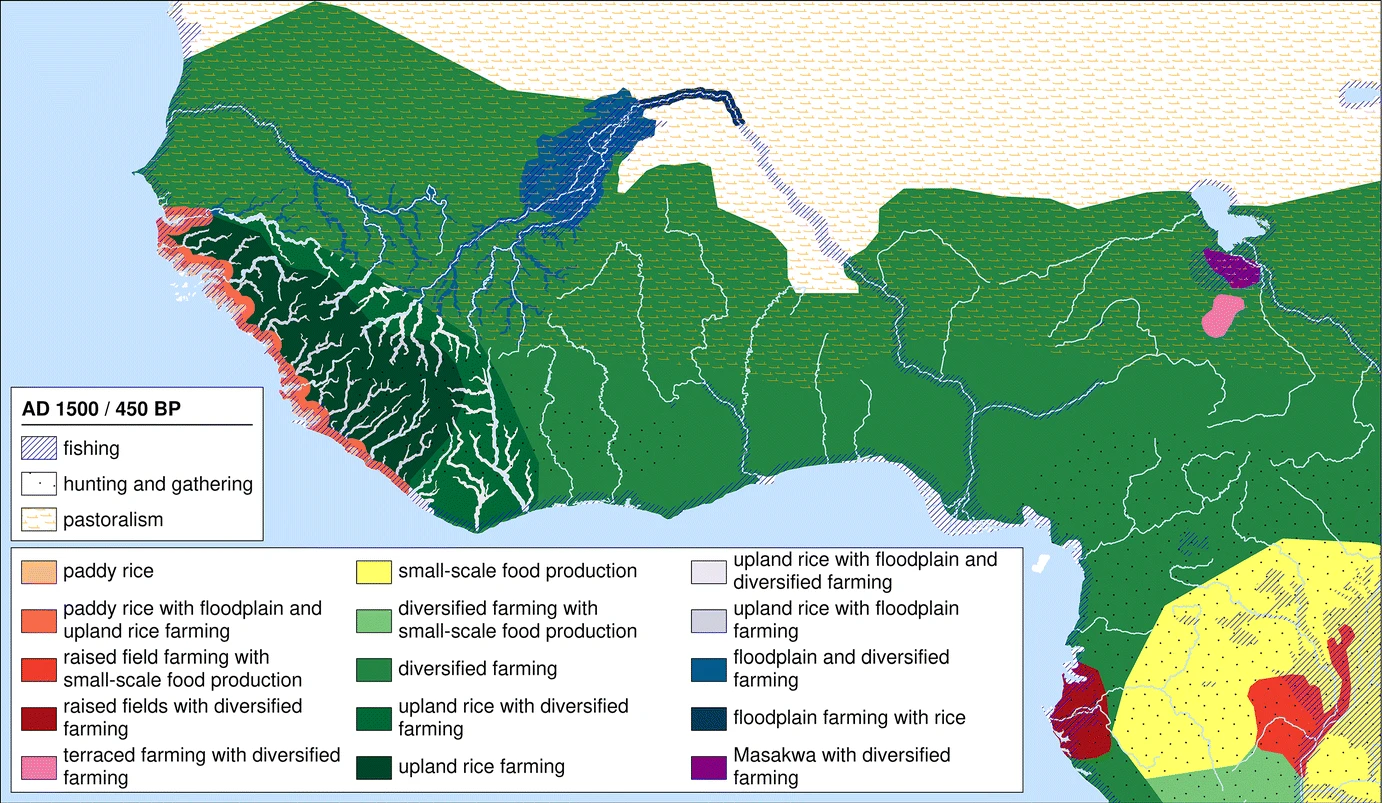
Map of livelihood distributions in 1500 CE Western Africa

== See also ==
- List of kingdoms in Africa throughout history#West Africa

=== History by region ===
- History of Africa
- History of Benin
- History of Burkina Faso
- History of Cape Verde
- History of Côte d'Ivoire
- History of the Gambia
- History of Ghana
- History of Guinea
- History of Guinea-Bissau
- History of Liberia
- History of Mali
- History of Mauritania
- History of Niger
- History of Nigeria
- History of Saint Helena
- History of Senegal
- History of Sierra Leone
- History of Togo

=== Related articles ===
- Population history of West Africa
- Trade & Pilgrimage Routes of Ghana

== Bibliography ==
- Ajayi, J.F. Ade, and Michael Crowder. History of West Africa (2 vol. 1970–87)
- Collins, Robert O.; Burns, James M. (2007). A History of Sub-Saharan Africa. Cambridge University Press. ISBN 978-0-521-86746-7.
- Davidson, Basil (1971). Great Ages of Man: African Kingdoms. New York, NY: Time Life. LCCN 66-25647.
- Davidson, Basil (1991). Africa in History. New York, NY: Macmillan.
- Ehret, Christopher (2002). The Civilizations of Africa. University Press of Virginia.
- Ham, Anthony (2009). West Africa. Lonely Planet. ISBN 978-1-74104-821-6.
- Iliffe, John (2007). Africans: The History of a Continent. African Studies. Vol. 108 (2nd ed.). Cambridge University Press. ISBN 978-1-139-46424-6.
- Laporte, L.; Bocoum, H.; Cros, J.‑P.; Delvoye, A.; Bernard, R.; Diallo, M.; Diop, M.; Kane, A.; Dartois, V.; Lejay, M.; Bertin, F.; Quesnel, L. (June 2012). Carver, Martin (ed.). "Megalithic monumentality in Africa: from graves to stone circles at Wanar, Senegal" (PDF). Antiquity. 86 (332). Antiquity Publications Ltd.: 409–427. doi:10.1017/S0003598X00062840. S2CID 162541130.
- Onwuanibe, Richard C. (1979). "The philosophy of African medical practice". Issue: A Journal of Opinion. 9 (3). African Studies Association: 25–28. doi:10.2307/1166259. JSTOR 1166259.
- Shillington, Kevin (2005). History of Africa (2nd ed.). Palgrave Macmillan. ISBN 978-0-333-59957-0.
- Speth, Peter (2010). Impacts of Global Change on the Hydrological Cycle in West and Northwest Africa. Springer. Bibcode:2011igch.book.....S. ISBN 978-3-642-12956-8.
- Tishkoff, S. A.; Reed, Floyd A.; Friedlaender, Françoise R.; Ehret, Christopher; Ranciaro, Alessia; Froment, Alain; Hirbo, Jibril B.; Awomoyi, Agnes A.; Bodo, Jean-Marie; Doumbo, Ogobara; Ibrahim, Muntaser; Juma, Abdalla T.; Kotze, Maritha J.; Lema, Godfrey; Moore, Jason H.; Mortensen, Holly; Nyambo, Thomas B.; Omar, Sabah A.; Powell, Kweli; Pretorius, Gideon S.; Smith, Michael W.; Thera, Mahamadou A.; Wambebe, Charles; Weber, James L.; Williams, Scott M. (2009). "The genetic structure and history of Africans and African Americans" (PDF). Science. 324 (5930): 1035–1044. Bibcode:2009Sci...324.1035T. doi:10.1126/science.1172257. PMC 2947357. PMID 19407144.
- Timberlake, L. (14 September 1985). "The Sahel: drought, desertification and famine". Draper Fund Report (14): 17–19. PMID 12313941.
