= Tichitt tradition =

Earliest West African Civilization

Tichitt culture
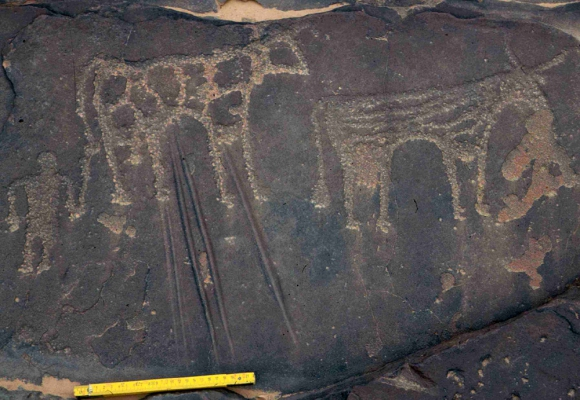
- Geographical range: Mauritania
- Period: Neolithic
- Dates: 2200 BCE to 500 BCE

The Tichitt tradition, or Tichitt culture, was created by proto-Mande peoples, namely the ancestors of the Soninke people. In 4000 BCE, the start of sophisticated social structure (e.g., trade of cattle as valued assets) developed among herders amid the Pastoral Period of the Sahara. Saharan pastoral culture (e.g., fields of tumuli, lustrous stone rings, axes) was intricate. By 1800 BCE, Saharan pastoral culture expanded throughout the Saharan and Sahelian regions. The initial stages of sophisticated social structure among Saharan herders served as the segue for the development of sophisticated hierarchies found in African settlements, such as Dhar Tichitt. After migrating from the Central Sahara, proto-Mande peoples established their civilization in the Tichitt region of the Western Sahara. The Tichitt Tradition of eastern Mauritania dates from 2200 BCE to 200 BCE.

Tichitt culture, at Dhar Néma, Dhar Tagant, Dhar Tichitt, and Dhar Walata, included a four-tiered hierarchical social structure, farming of cereals, metallurgy, numerous funerary tombs, and a rock art tradition. At Dhar Tichitt and Dhar Walata, pearl millet may have also been independently domesticated amid the Neolithic. Dhar Tichitt, which includes Dakhlet el Atrouss, may have served as the primary regional center for the multi-tiered hierarchical social structure of the Tichitt Tradition, and the Malian Lakes Region, which includes Tondidarou, may have served as a second regional center of the Tichitt Tradition. The settlements of Dhar Tichitt consisted of multiple stone-walled compounds containing houses and granaries/"storage facilities", sometimes with street layouts. Additionally, around some settlements, larger stone common "circumvallation walls" were built, suggesting that "special purpose groups" cooperated as a result of decisions "enforced for the benefit of the community as a whole." The urban Tichitt Tradition may have been the earliest large-scale, complexly organized society in West Africa, and an early civilization of the Sahara, which may have served as the segue for state formation in West Africa. Consequently, state-based urbanism in the Middle Niger and the Ghana Empire developed between the 2nd and 3rd centuries CE.

== Climate and geography ==
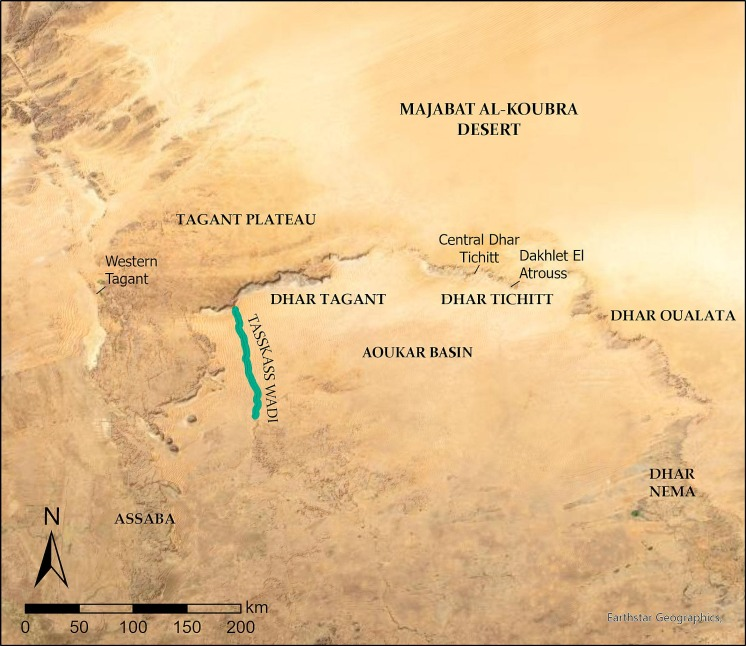
Geography of Tichitt culture

The Dhars, or cliffs, are located in the southeastern and central-southern regions of Mauritania. The cliffs span 800 kilometers. The Dhars (e.g., Dhar Tichitt, Dhar Walata, Dhar Tagant) of Mauritania are located north of the Senegal River. The Dhars of Mauritania are located between the Hodh Depression and Tagant Plateau. Dhar Néma and Dhar Tichitt are major escarpments in Mauritania. From east to west, Dhar Néma, Dhar Walata, Dhar Tichitt, and Dhar Tagant form a semicircular shape around the Hodh/Aoukar Depression, which, prior to 4000 BCE, was an area with lakes of considerable size, and, after 1000 BCE, was an area that had become increasingly dried. During the emergence of the Tichitt Tradition, it was an oasis area.

After 4500 BP, the Malian Lakes Region, around Lake Fati, underwent aridification; thereafter, Megalake Timbuktu, which at its height reached depths of 264 meters in 3900 BP, developed from the inputs of the Middle Niger riverine system. In the region, humidity reached its highest point in the first half of the 4th millennium BP, and reached its second highest point in the second half of the 4th millennium BP. More than one thousand stone villages were constructed, which spans 800 kilometers from the Niger Bend to the region northward of Taoudenni Basin, as well as spanning 600,000 km2 from the border of Mali and Mauritania to the region west of Tagant. In the Malian Lakes Region, which is located in northwestern Inland Niger Delta region of the Niger River, near Lake Faguibine and the Faguibine Depression, and north of Méma, these drystone constructed stone-walled settlement sites may be connected with the Tichitt Tradition of Mauritania.

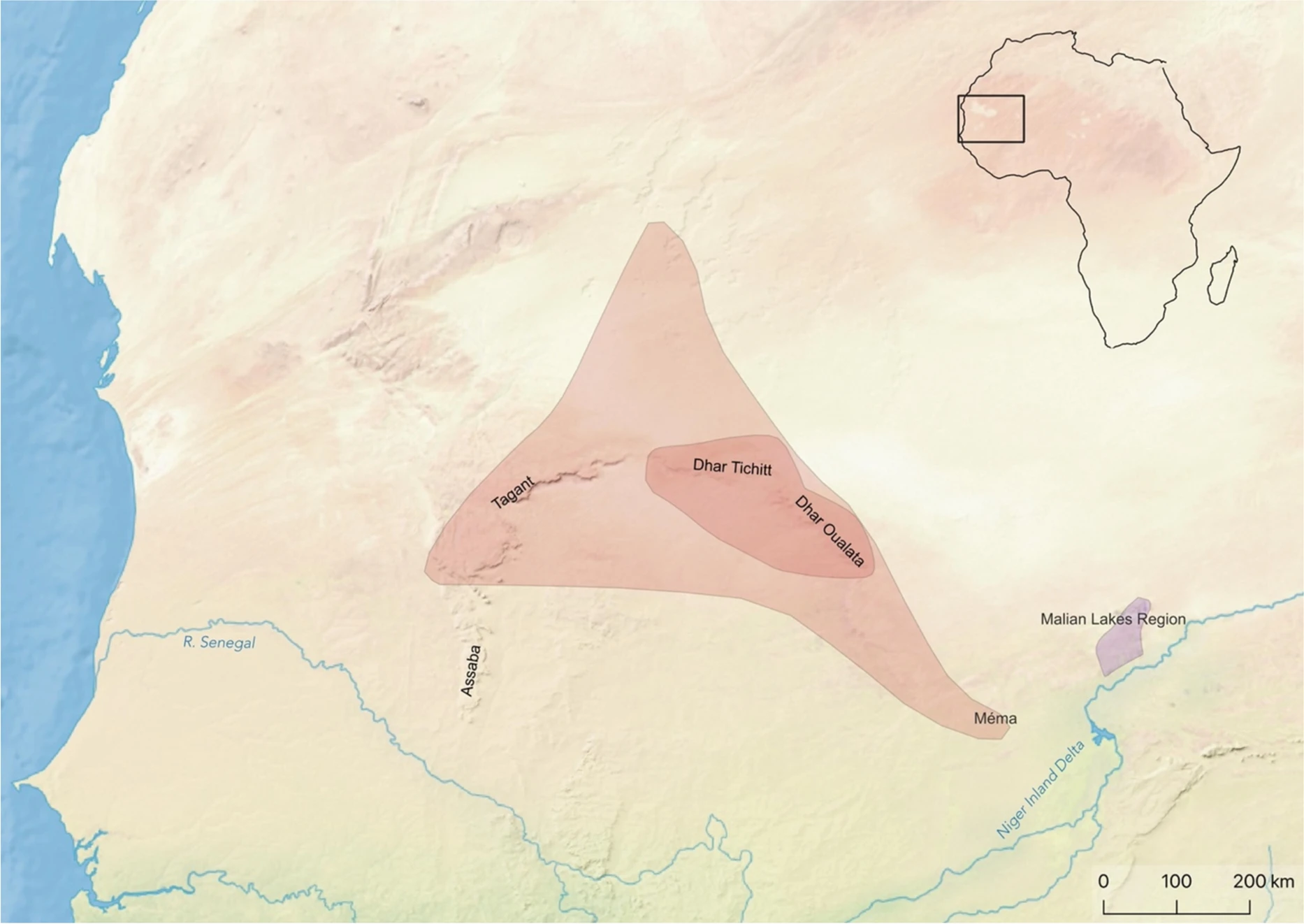
Tichitt culture of Mauritania and the Malian Lakes Region

== Tichitt cultural tradition ==
Between 4th millennium BCE and 1st millennium CE, pastoralists occupied the western region (e.g., Mauritania, Morocco) of the Sahara. The pastoralist culture included social stratification, as evidenced by lavish items (e.g., beads, bracelets, hachettes, lustrous stone axes) found in tumuli. In the Hodh Depression area of southern Mauritania, from early 2nd millennium to late 1st millennium BCE, the pastoralist culture developed into various forms of pre-state urbanism (e.g., habitat patterns of nucleation and differentiation). By 2000 BCE, as aridification followed the Holocene Climate Optimum, the pastoralists had become agropastoralists and had established the Tichitt tradition in the Mauritanian settlement areas of Dhar Tichitt, Dhar Walata, and Dhar Néma, based on a hierarchical economy composed of pastoralism, agriculture (e.g., millet), and stonemasonry (e.g., architecture). In the Sahelian region of West Africa, the corded roulette ceramics of the Tichitt Tradition developed and persisted among dry stonewalled architecture in Mauritania (e.g., Dhar Tichitt, Dhar Walata, Dhar Néma, Dhar Tagant) between 1900 BCE and 400 BCE. Within these settled areas (e.g., Dhar Tichitt, Dhar Tagant, Dhar Walata) with stone walls, which vary in scale from (e.g., 2 hectares, 80 hectares), there were walled agricultural land used for livestock or gardening as well as land with granaries and tumuli.

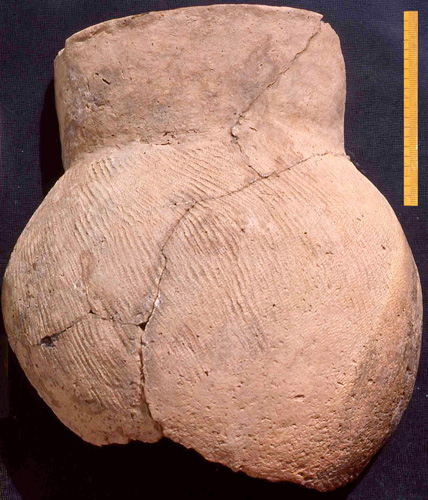
Small jar

As areas where the Tichitt cultural tradition were present, Dhar Tichitt and Dhar Walata were occupied more frequently than Dhar Néma. The eastern and central areas of Dhar Walata and Dhar Tichitt, which were primarily peopled between 2200/2000 BCE and 1200/1000 BCE and contained some areas (e.g., Akreijit, Chebka, Khimiya) with boundary walls, served as the primary areas of settlement (e.g., small villages, hamlets, seasonal camps) for the Dhars of Mauritania. The fundamental unit of the Mauritanian Dhars (e.g., Dhar Néma, Dhar Walata, Dhar Tichitt) was the extended family or polygamous family. Based on the presence of an abundant amount of enclosed areas that may have been used to pen cattle and hundreds of tumuli, intergenerational ownership of property, via cattle wealth, may have been part of the Tichitt culture. Planned, level streets spanned several hundred kilometers among the 400 drystone-constructed villages, hamlets, and towns. Primary entry points of residences with access ramps (e.g., fortified, non-fortified) and watchtowers were also present. Households used various tools (e.g., arrowheads, axes, borers, grindstones, grooved stones, needles, pendants). At Dhar Walata and Dhar Tichitt, stone pillars, stone slabs, and stone blocks, which approximate to several hundred in total, are frequently arranged and aligned in three rows of three; these erected stones may have served as stilts for granaries. There were also gardens and fields located within a walled enclosure ranging between nine and fourteen hectares. At Dhar Nema, there are also stilted granaries, pottery, and tools used for milling. At Dhar Walata and Dhar Tichitt, copper was also used. Tichitt culture may have also made cultural contributions (e.g., architecture, ceramics) to Garamantian culture, which was then subsequently reconstrued and innovated by Garamantes as these contributions were incorporated into Garamantian culture.

Aerial view of Akreijit

The people of Tichitt culture crafted (e.g., arrows, arrowheads, grindstones, quartz beads, scrapers) in workshops as well as farmed and penned livestock, fished, and hunted. A primary feature of the Tichitt culture is the shepherding of livestock and the cultivation of pearl millet. Various kinds of local food sources (e.g., Panicum laetum, Cenchrus biflorus, Pennisetum mollissimum; fruits from Ziziphus lotus, Balanites, Celtis integrifolia, and Ephedra altissima; Citrullus, Gazella, Addax nasomaculatus, Oryx dammah, Mellivora capensis, Taurotragus derbianus, Kobus, Hippotragus equinus, Tragelaphus, Cricetomys gambianus, Genetta genetta, Panthera pardus, Equus, Rhinoceros, Ichthyofauna, Clarias, Tilapia, Molluscs, Parreysia) were eaten by the people of the Tichitt culture.

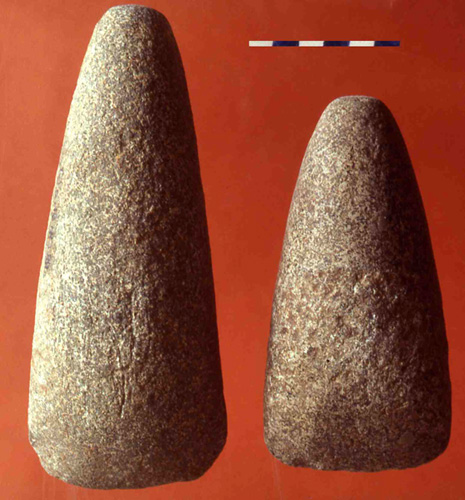
Stone axes from Dhar Tichitt

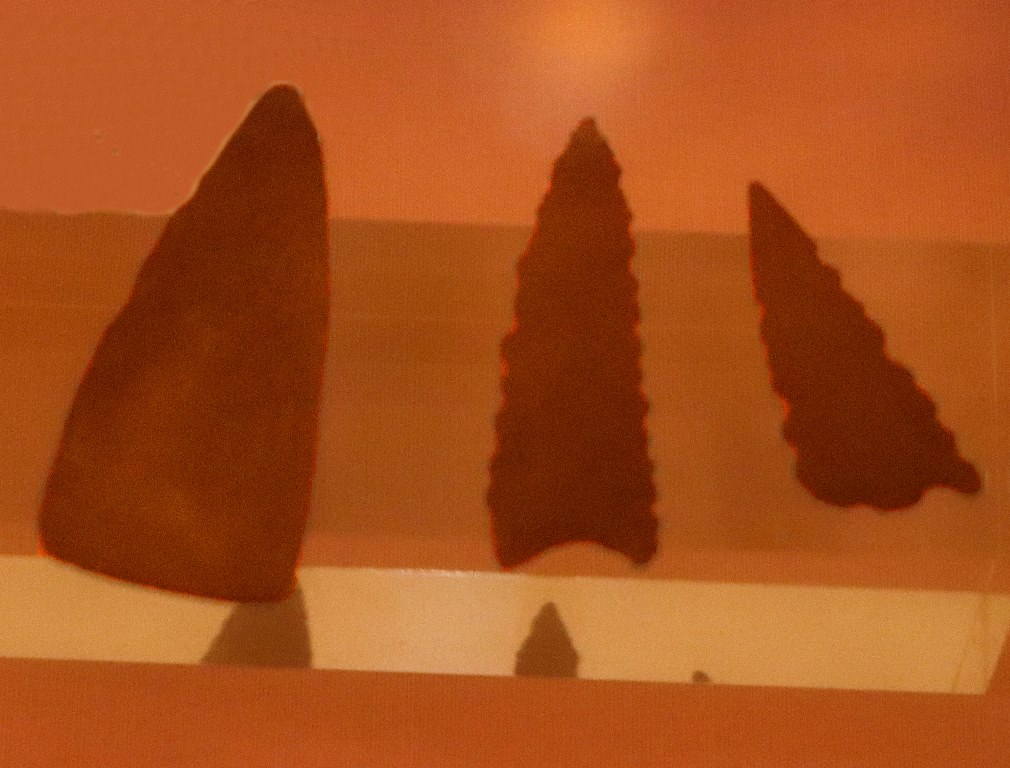
Lithics associated with the Tichitt culture

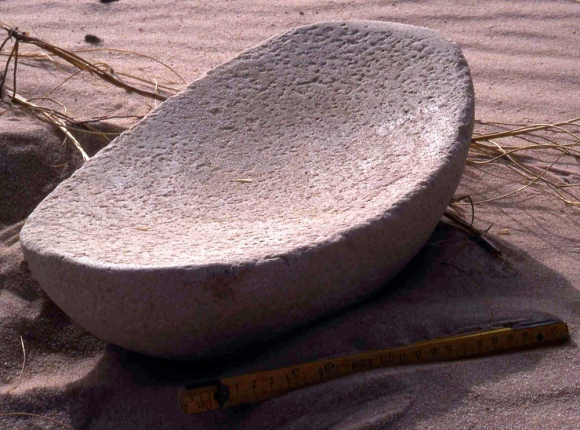
Grinding stone

=== Dhar Tichitt ===
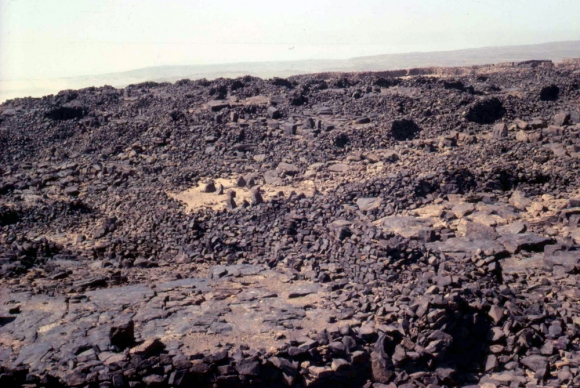
Aspect of a village

At Dhar Tichitt and Dhar Walata, the people of the Tichitt Tradition were considerably mobile each season; they practiced animal husbandry (e.g., sheep, goat, cattle), fished, and, by at least 3600 BP, domesticated and farmed pearl millet. However, farming of crops (e.g., millet) may have been a feature of the Tichitt cultural tradition as early as 3rd millennium BCE in Dhar Tichitt. The origin of pearl millet at Dhar Tichitt may date to 3500 BCE. At Dhar Tichitt, domesticated pearl millet imprints in pottery have been dated between 1900 BCE and 1500 BCE. Based on the hundreds of tumuli present in Dhar Tichitt, compared to a dozen tumuli present in Dhar Walata, it is likely that Dhar Tichitt was the primary center of religion for the people of Tichitt culture.

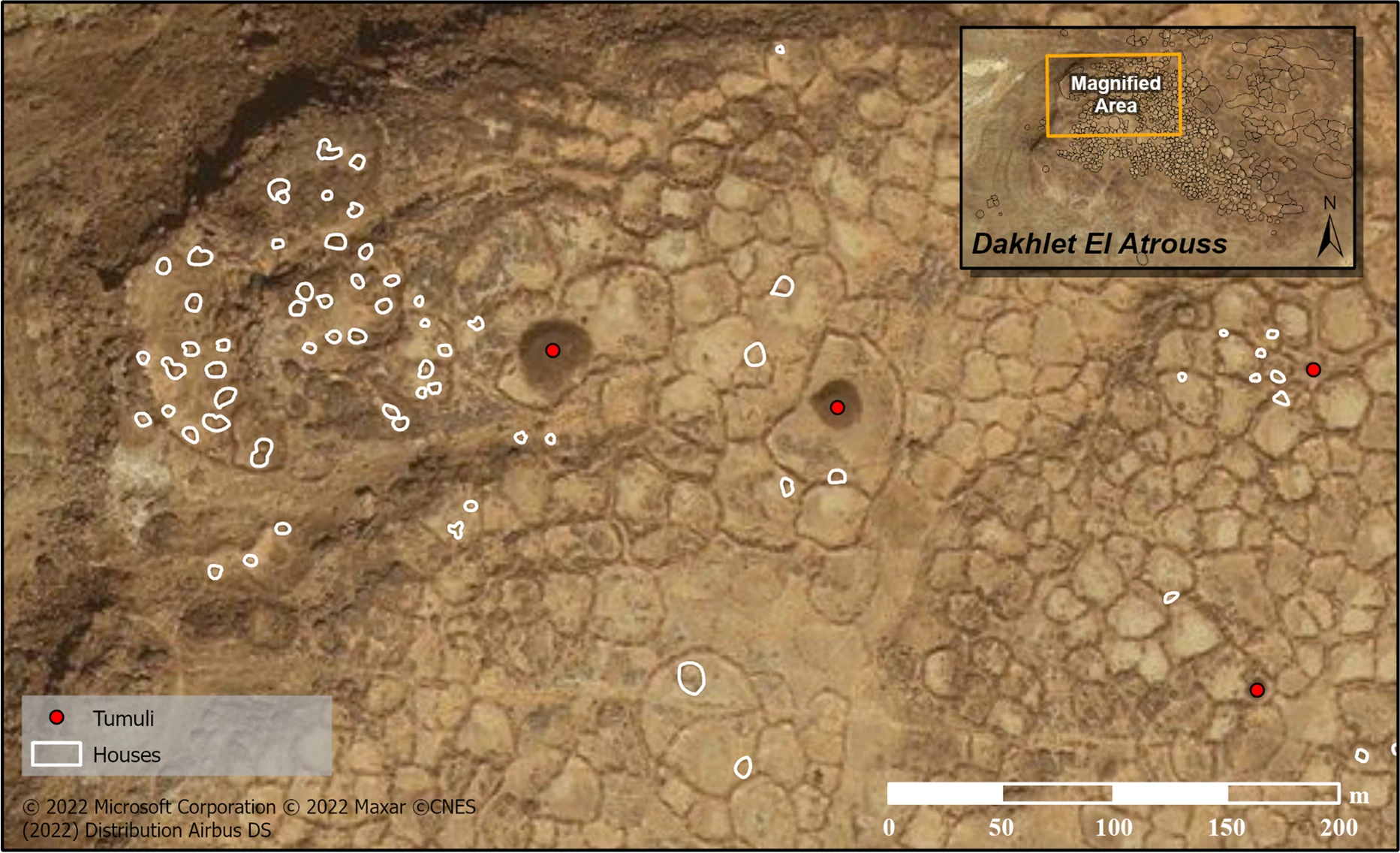
Aerial view of Dakhlet el Atrouss I

At Dhar Tichit, Dakhlet el Atrouss I, which is the largest archaeological site of the Tichitt Tradition and is 80 hectares in scale, serves as the primary regional center for the multi-tiered hierarchical social structure of Tichitt culture; it features nearly 600 settlement compounds, agropastoralism, a large enclosure for cattle, and monumental architecture as an aspect of its funerary culture, such as hundreds of tumuli nearby. Along with Akrejit, it also features foundations for granaries.

==== Rock Art ====
Engraved and painted Pastoral rock art relating to the agropastoralists of Dhar Tichitt, characterized by dark patina and developed using hammerstones only or hammerstones used with a lithic or metal implement, were composed of various rock artforms (e.g., humans/herders, domesticated and undomesticated animals, walled compounds, symbols – cattle, oxen, two ox carts being pulled by oxen, cows with udders, a calf, sheep, goats, two large ostriches) that date to the Late Stone Age. Dating was confirmed by bones from a hippopotamus (2290±110 BP) and a few white rhinoceros (4000 BP – 2400 BP). A notable attribute of the Dhar Tichitt rock art is the large depiction of a bull, which, due to its value in agropastoral life as a form of wealth, may have had symbolic and/or religious significance for the agropastoralists of Dhar Tichitt. The painted Pastoral rock art of Tassili n'Ajjer, Algeria and engraved Pastoral rock art of Niger bear resemblance (e.g., color markings of the cattle) with the engraved cattle portrayed in the Dhar Tichitt rock art in Akreijit. The engraved cattle pastoral rock art of Dhar Tichitt, which are displayed in enclosed areas that may have been used to pen cattle, is supportive evidence for cattle bearing ritualistic significance for the people of Dhar Tichitt.

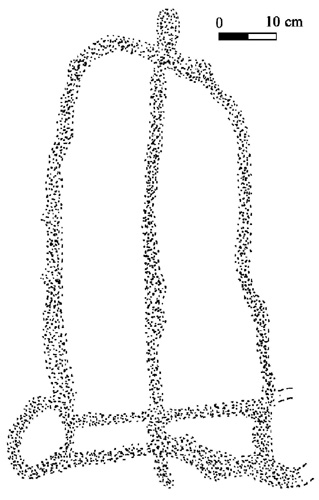
Rock art depicting cart, with long platform, framed by two wheels

=== Dhar Walata/Oualata ===
At Dhar Walata, in the courtyard of nearby houses, enclosed, erected turriform gardens have been found, the earliest of which dates between 1894 cal BCE and 1435 cal BCE. Hoes and fish hooks made of bone were also found. Stone slabs may have been used as a ballast to avert the entry of animals into the village. Reservoirs and dams may have been used to manage water from nearby rivers (wadis). Millet, flour, and semolina may have been prepared to cook porridge. At Dhar Walata, domesticated pearl millet imprints in pottery have been dated between 1900 BCE and 1500 BCE.

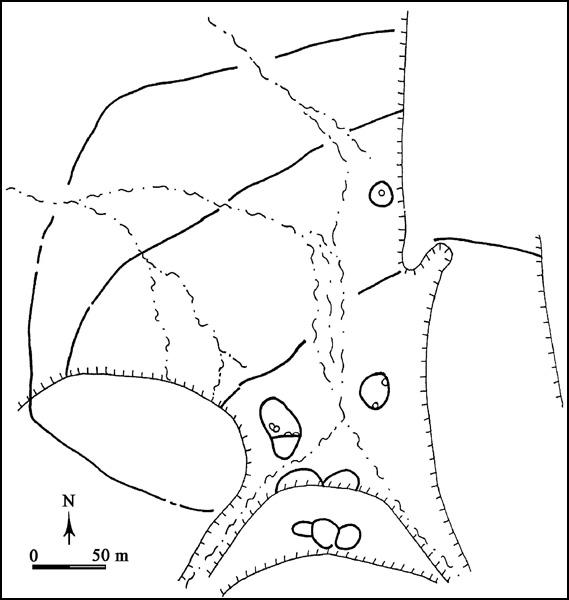
Dam walls on the slopes of Dhar Walata

==== Rock Art ====
The Neolithic Pastoral rock art of Dhar Walata and Dhar Tichitt may depict chariots being drawn forward by yoked oxen and a woman who has on a small tunic. The rock art of Dhar Walata may depict a cart being drawn forward by an ox, a man who with a tunic on that extends over part of his legs, and a man with an elongated staff that may be used as a projectile and a shield.

==== Human Remains ====
Two human skeletal remains were found at Dhar Walata. Though one is undated, based on the date of the other human skeletal remains found nearby, is dated to 3930 ± 80 BP.

=== Dhar Néma ===
In the late period of the Tichitt Tradition at Dhar Néma, domesticated pearl millet was used to temper the tuyeres of an oval-shaped low shaft furnace; this furnace was one out of 16 iron furnaces located on elevated ground. Iron metallurgy may have developed before the second half of 1st millennium BCE, as indicated by pottery dated between 800 BCE and 200 BCE. At Dhar Nema, domesticated pearl millet imprints in pottery have been dated between 1750 BCE and 1500 BCE.

==== Rock Art ====
The engraved Pastoral rock art of Dhar Néma borders Dhar Walata. The rock art of Dhar Néma, Dhar Walata, and Dhar Tichitt bear cultural/artistic commonalities (e.g., cattle, engraving methods) with one another. While there are more quadruped depictions than anthropomorphic depictions at Dhar Néma, there are more anthropomorphic depictions found at Dhar Nema than at Dhar Walata or Dhar Tichitt.

The Neolithic rock art of Dhar Néma portrays various animal depictions (e.g., cattle, oryxes, giraffes), including anthropomorphic figures (e.g., men; women; man sitting on an ox with a lasso, bow, or shield; man using a throwing weapon on an oryx; man sitting on a saddled ox; person holding a basket). The depiction of the man arriving back from hunting an oryx likely occurred when the landscape was still a savanna, as indicated by the depiction of three trotting giraffes with a common heading. Akin to the Y-symbol associated with the hunting cultures of the Sahara and Nile, the three half-lines symbol that is depicted in the Dhar Néma rock art may be associated with the hunting culture of Dhar Néma.

==== Human Remains ====
Human skeletal remains found at Bou Khzama in Dhar Néma have been dated to 3690 ± 60 BP. Another human skeletal remains found at Dhar Néma have been dated to 2095 ± 55 BP.

=== Dhar Tagant ===
At Dhar Tagant, there are approximately 276 tumuli that have been surveyed. At Dhar Tagant, there are also various geometric (e.g., rectilinear, circular) constructions, and a possible late period, involving a funerary tomb with a chapel at Foum el Hadjar from 1st millennium CE and wadis with evidence of crocodiles. As part of a broader trend of iron metallurgy developed in the West African Sahel amid 1st millennium BCE, iron items (350 BCE – 100 CE) were found at Dhar Tagant, iron metalworking and/or items (800 BCE – 400 BCE) were found at Dia Shoma and Walaldé, and the iron remnants (760 BCE – 400 BCE) found at Bou Khzama and Djiganyai. The iron materials that were found are evidence of iron metalworking at Dhar Tagant.

While confirmation of the connection is still needed, Tabarit East tumuli of western Tagant are similar in form to Tichitt Tradition tumuli. In southeastern Mauritania, there are more than 9000 tumuli; the monument-building techniques of this funerary tradition resulted in tumuli being able to persist in form for millennia to the present-day. While smaller tumuli may have been built by members of the nuclear family, larger tumuli may have been built by members of nuclear and extended family.

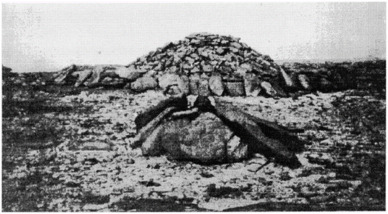
Tichitt Tradition drystone tumulus

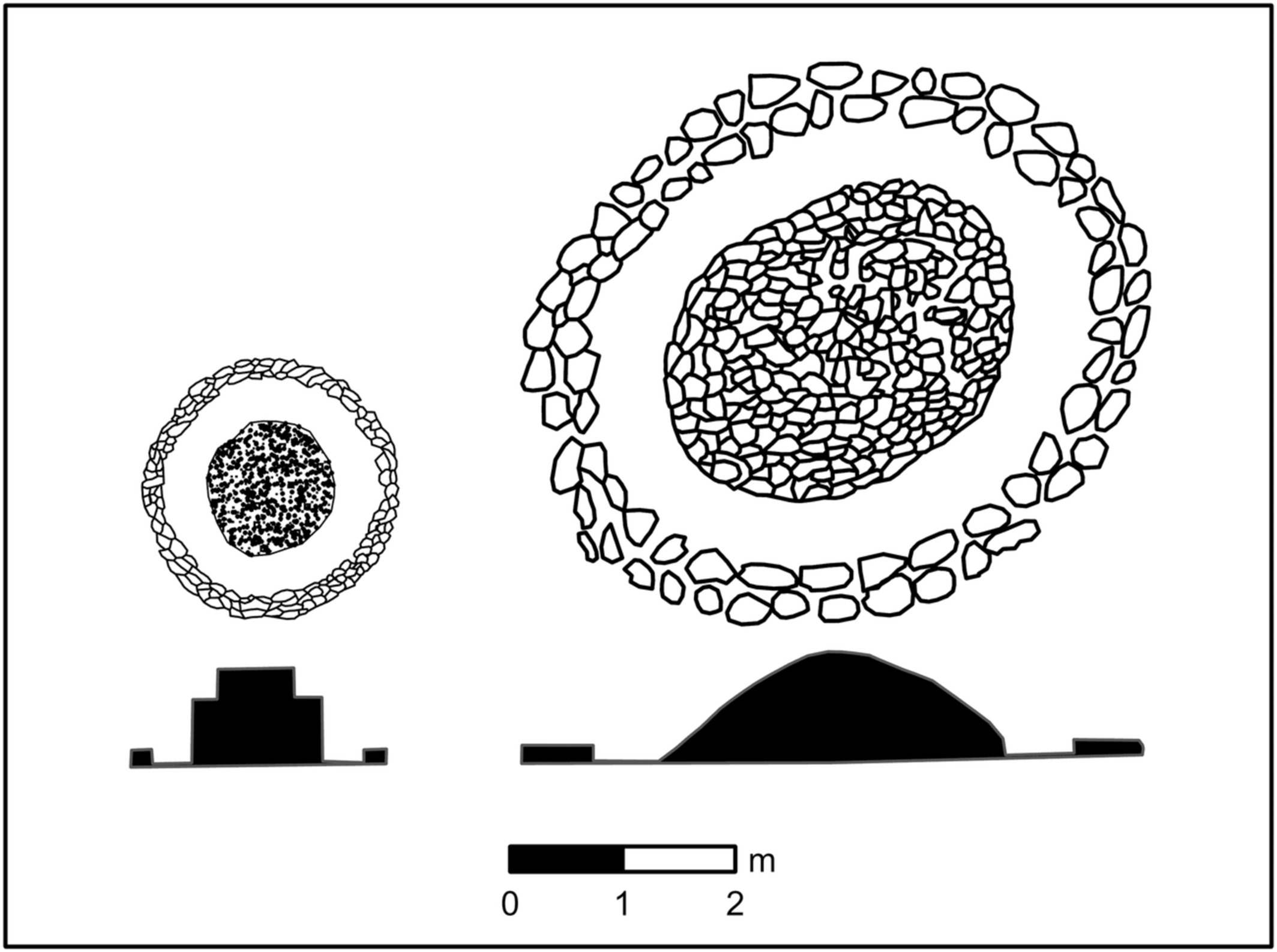
Two types of prehistoric funerary monuments in the Dhar Tagant region of south-eastern Mauritania

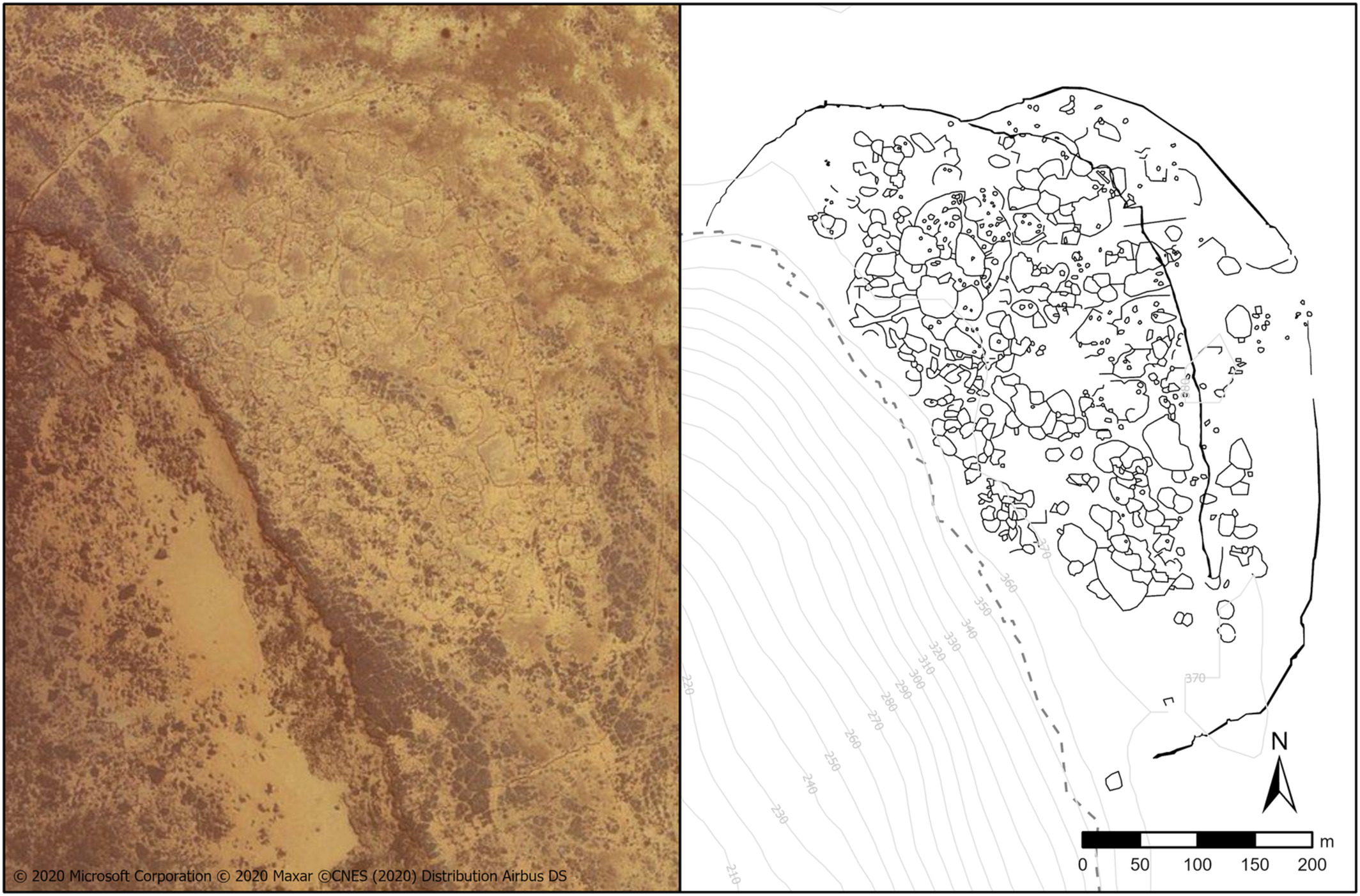
T150, a double-walled settlement on the flat plateau edge of the Dhar Tagant escarpment

=== Malian Lakes Region ===
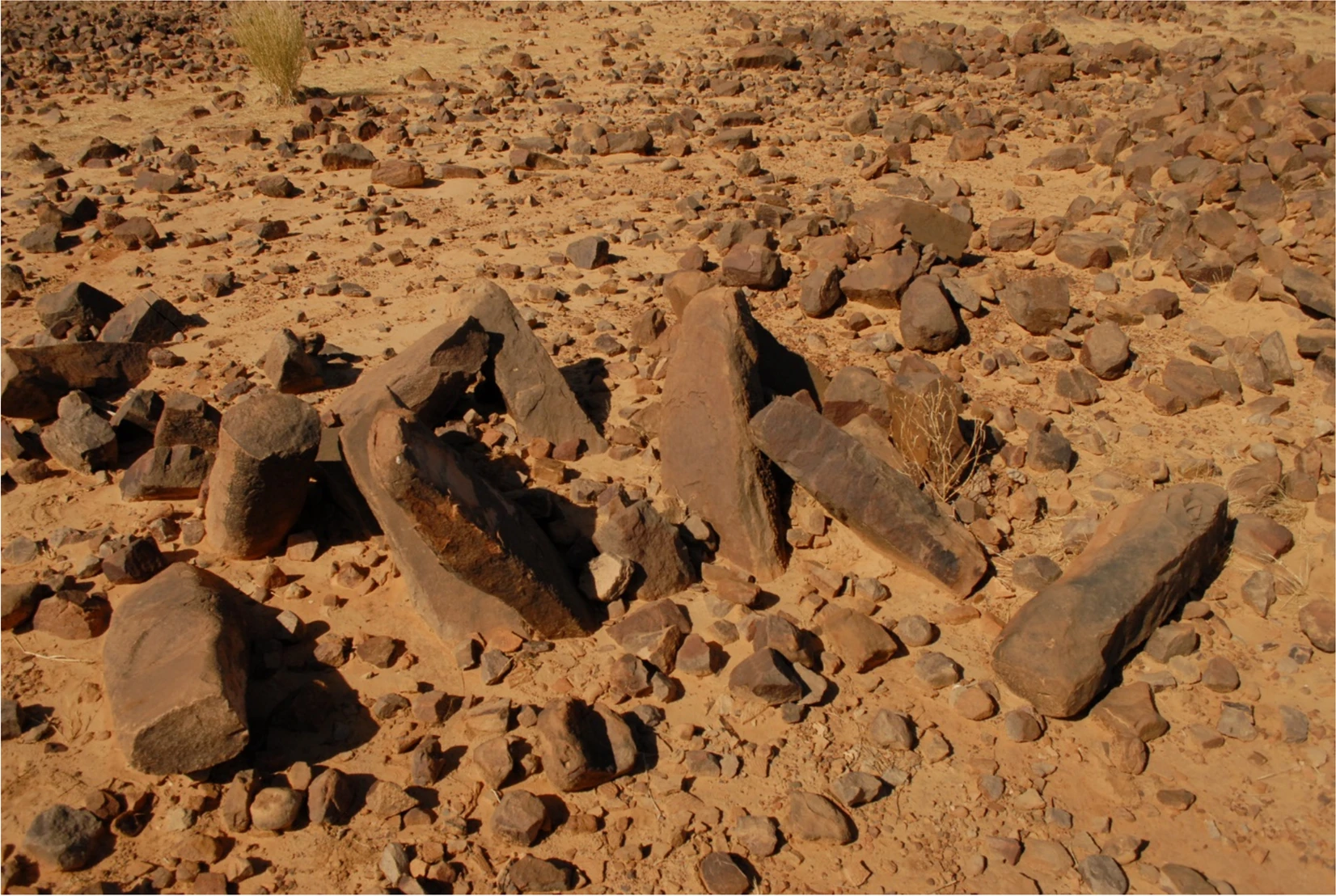
Stone pillar structure at Fati 6

The Malian Lakes Region may have served as the second regional center of the Tichitt Tradition. In the Malian Lakes Region, there is a drystone enclosure that is greater than 4 meters in height and several hundred meters in circumference, two cemeteries, and within the enclosure, a possible cistern building with remnants of a room that is between 6 meters and 7 meters in diameter; there are also other drystone structures of different sizes and kinds, which include a large rectangular enclosure, enclosures with small-sized circular structures, a carved stone as part of a broader system of structures, stone walls, as well as cemeteries with stones positioned in the head and foot areas of the graves. Additionally, there are stones that are 2 meters in diameter are set within circular patterns are found among a few stone structures, grindstone and millstone remnants, and pottery with decorative patterns. Within the region, nearby Tondidarou, a stone wall may have served as a regional boundary, stone tumuli and circles that may be cemeteries, and a couple of drystone fortification remnants; there are also pottery and stone tools at Mobangou, as well as mounds and stone structures nearby Mobangou. On the eastern side of Lake Fati, there are large enclosures on the massifs containing dozens of conjoined circular drystone structures, and on the eastern side of Lake Faguibine, there are similar enclosures and structures spanning 74 kilometers north from its eastern shoreside; there are also stone walls ranging about one meter in height.

The Malian Lakes Region sites share connections with Tichitt Tradition sites via one of its categorized sites. Tell-type site pottery of the Malian Lakes Region also is similar in appearance (e.g., folded strip roulettes, thickened rims) to Faïta pottery. In total, there are 180 villages, hamlets, and many types of stone structures and enclosures. Among the total constructed stone villages, 30 stone villages may have evidence of concessions with stone pillar structures in them; there is also Fati 6 where a drystone tell is of an intermediary architectural status between the earlier drystone structures in the escarpment region and the later drystone structures of the Tondidarou region; both show close resemblance and apparent connection with the architectural structures of the Tichitt culture. The Malian Lakes Region and the Mauritanian Tichitt cultural region bear strong geographic resemblance (e.g., escarpments) and similar complex settlement patterns on and below the escarpments. In the Malian Lakes Region, the stone villages may have been constructed between the 2nd millennium BCE and the 1st millennium BCE. In 1st millennium CE, earthen tells were created in the plains, along the shoresides and in floodplains of the Niger River at Tondidarou; the difference in distance and dates may indicate that there was gradual change in settlement sites, from the regional section of the Malian Lake Region where the escarpments are located toward the regional section where Tondidarou is located, as well as gradual technical shift toward construction of earthen settlement mounds. Altogether, the archaeological evidence on and below the Malian Lakes Region escarpments of the 2nd millennium BCE - 1st millennium BCE may serve as connective evidence between Mema, Tondidarou and other Middle Niger sites of the 1st millennium CE, and the Tichitt Tradition of Mauritania.

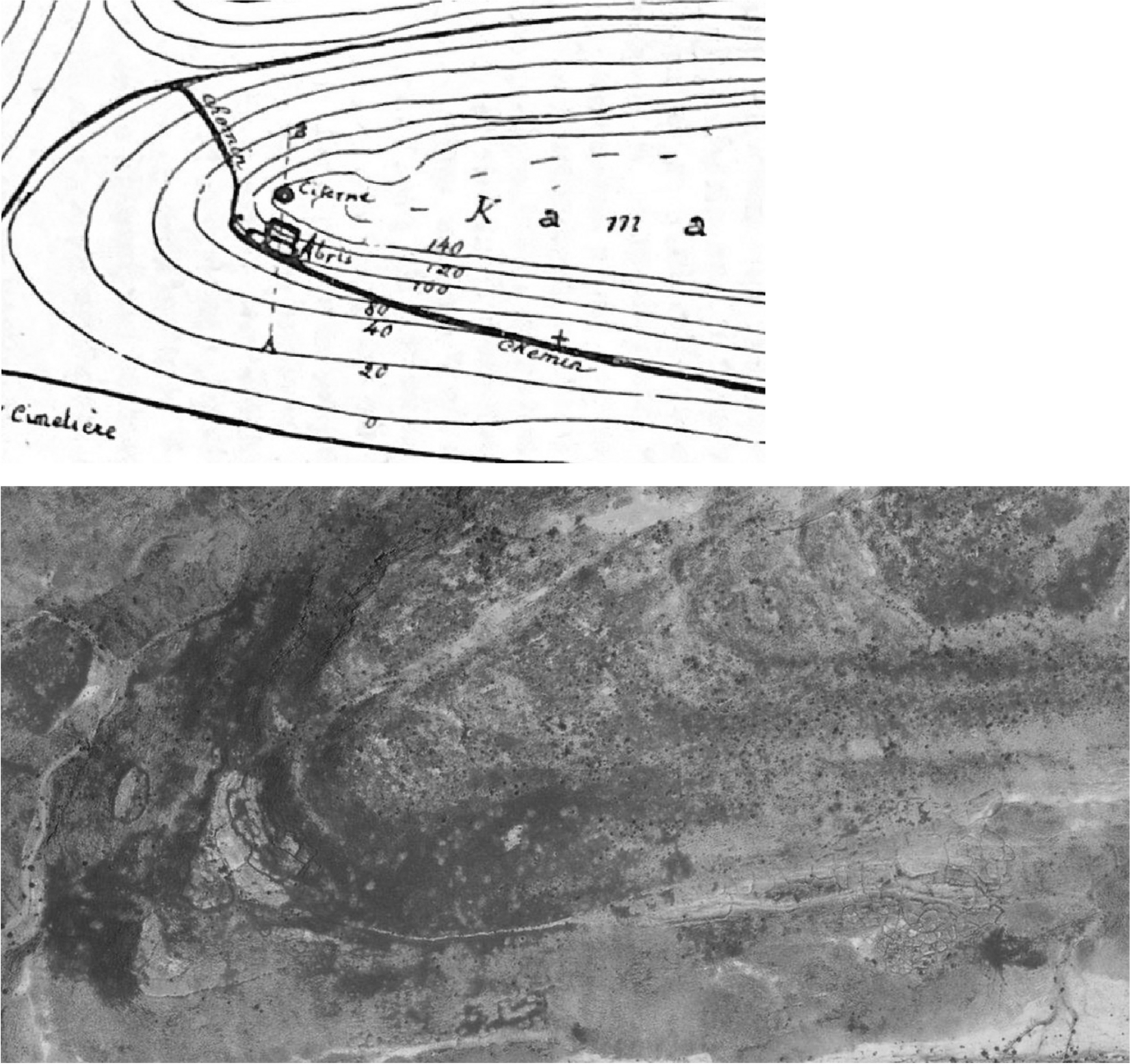
Map and satellite image

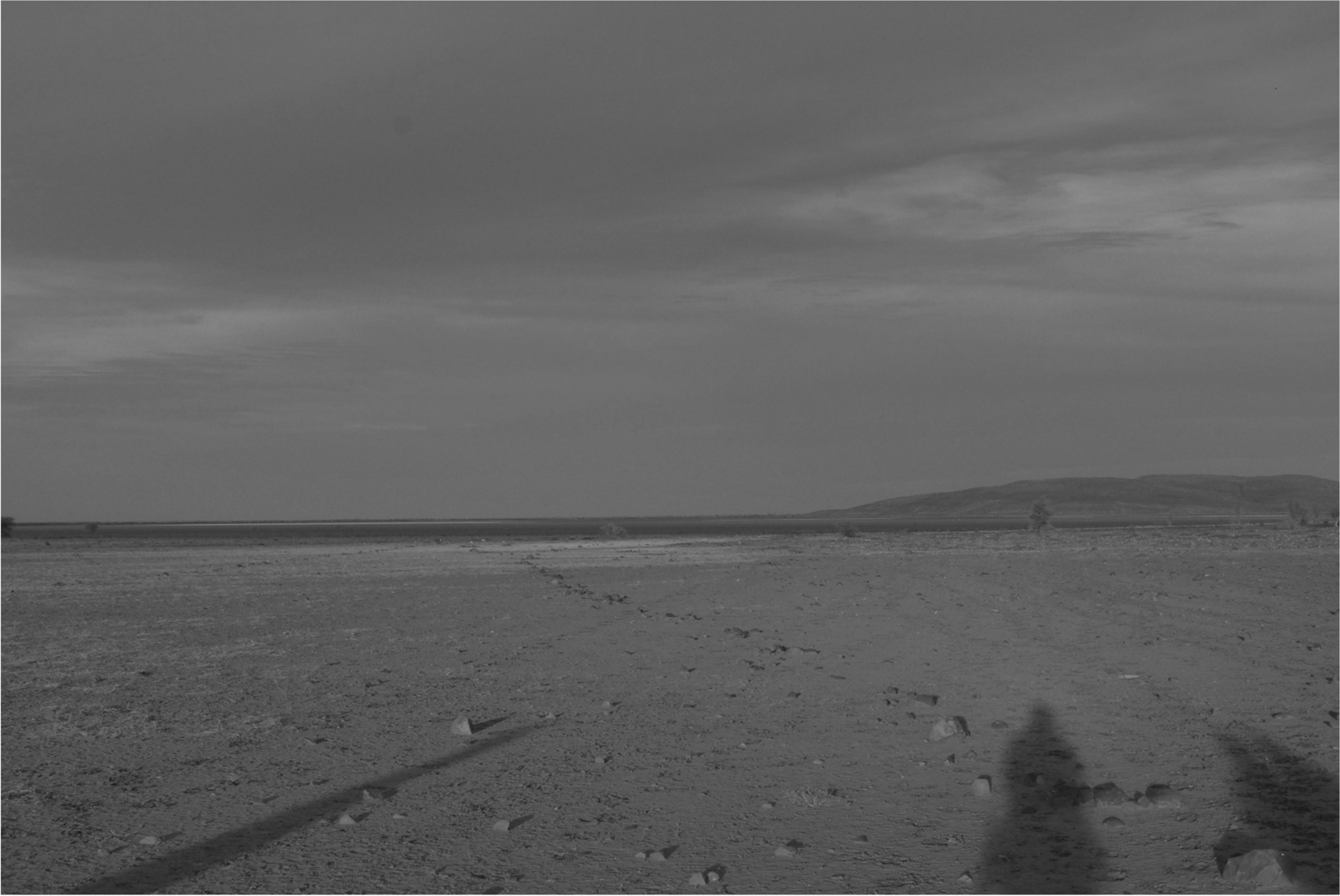
Field boundary on the western shore of Lake Fati

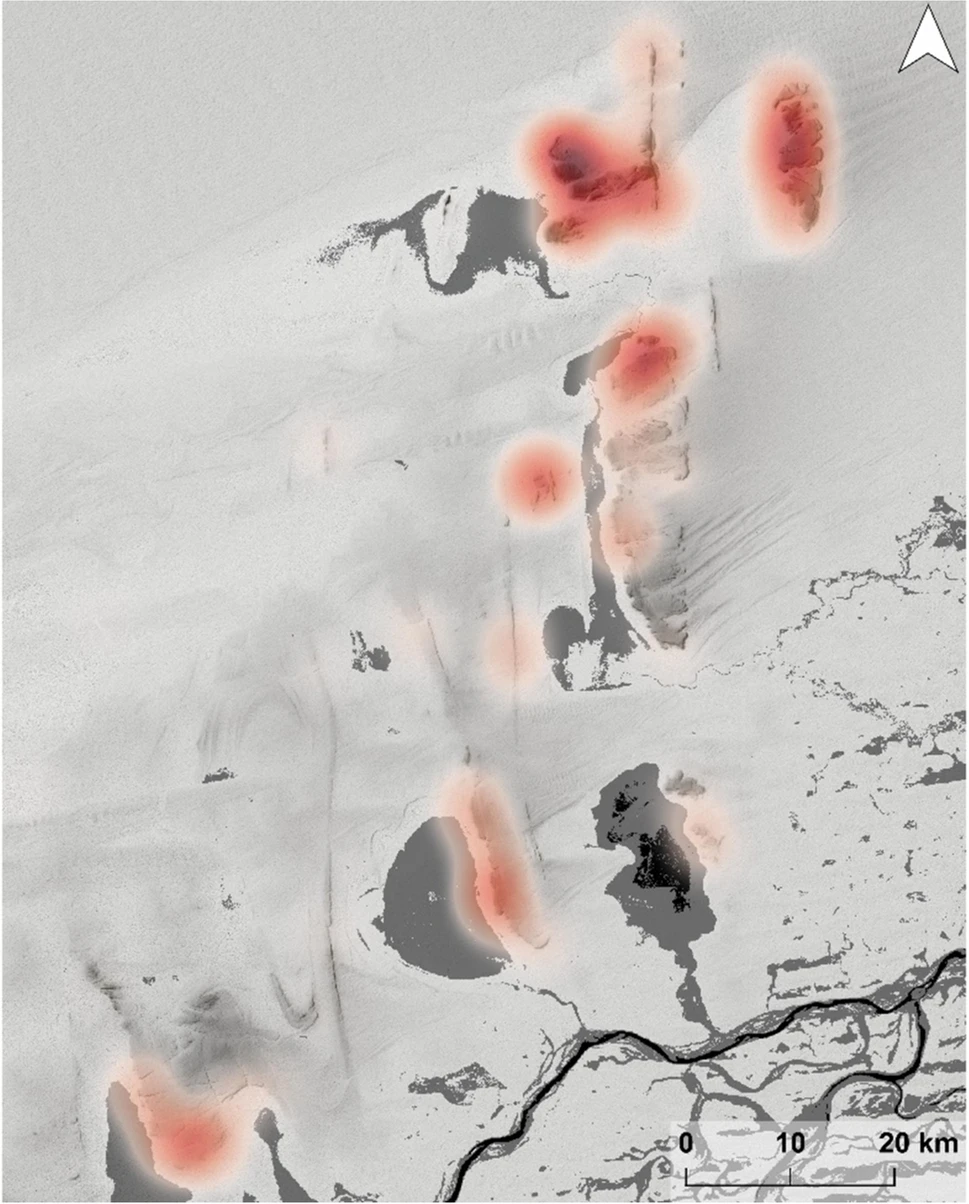
Location densities of sites, showing clear preferences for sandstone escarpments. Permanent water (1984–2021) in black, impermanent water in grey.

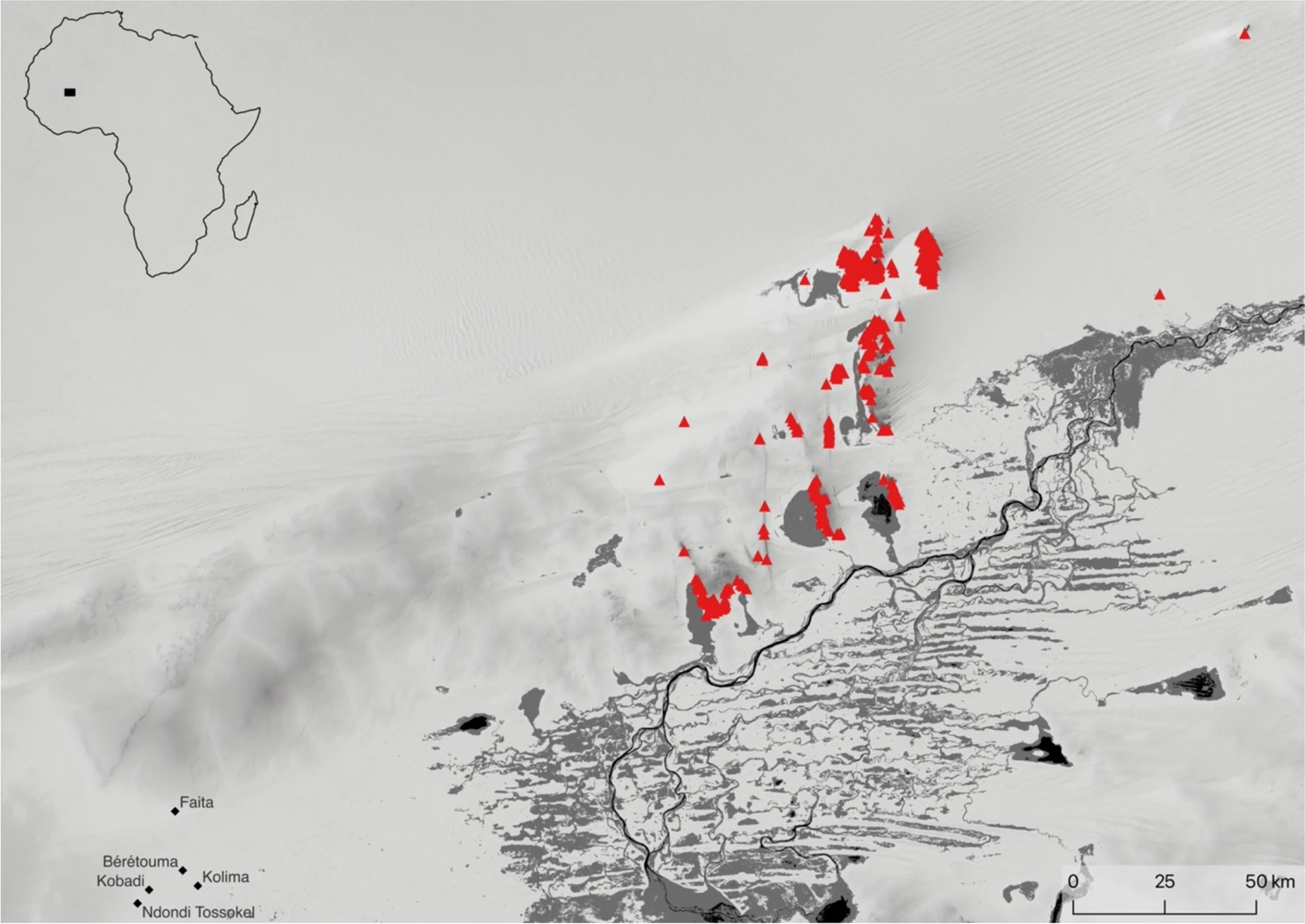
Location of documented sites. Permanent water (1984–2021) in black, impermanent water in grey.

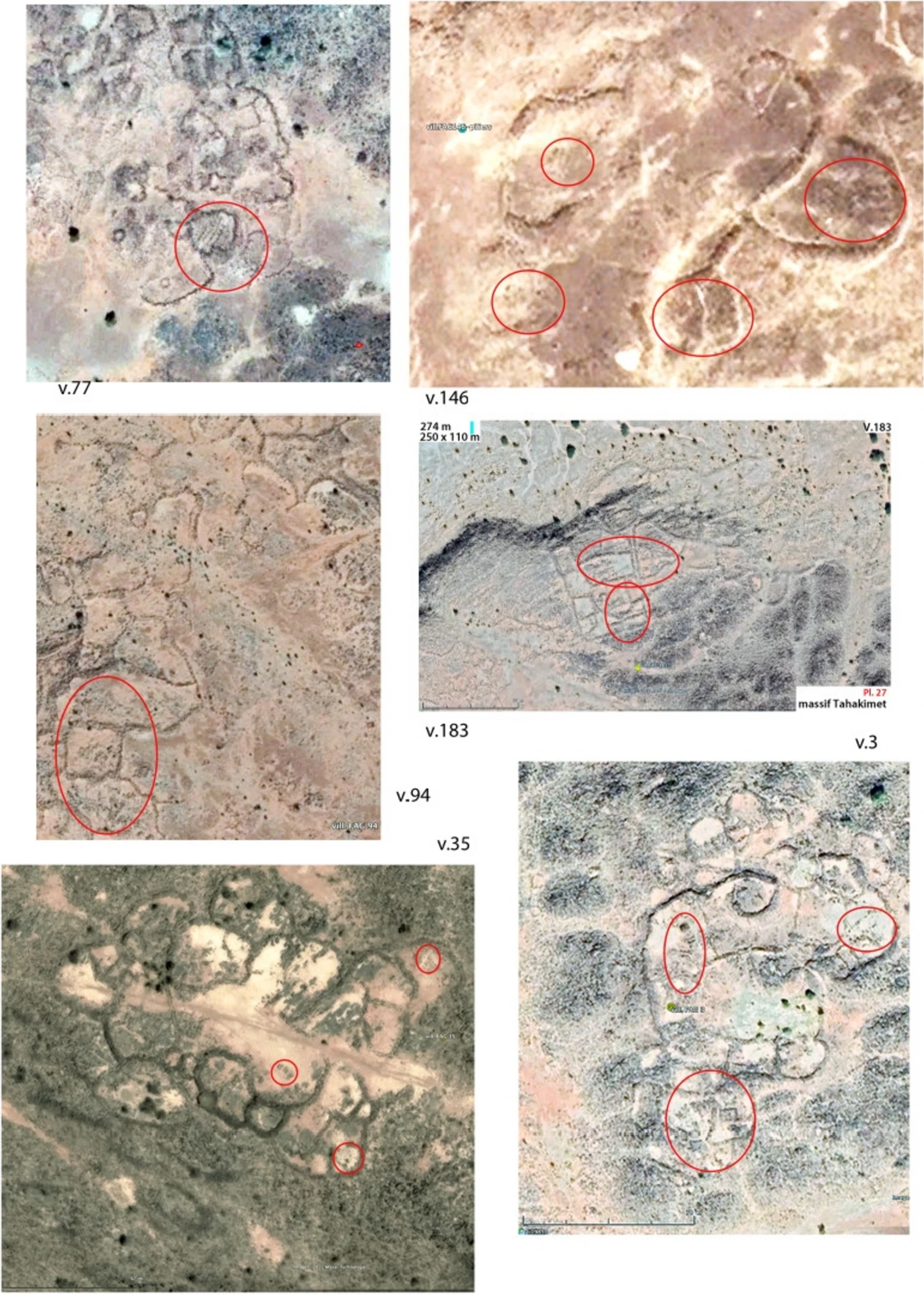
Possible pillar structures in village sites of the Mali Lakes Region

== Legacy ==
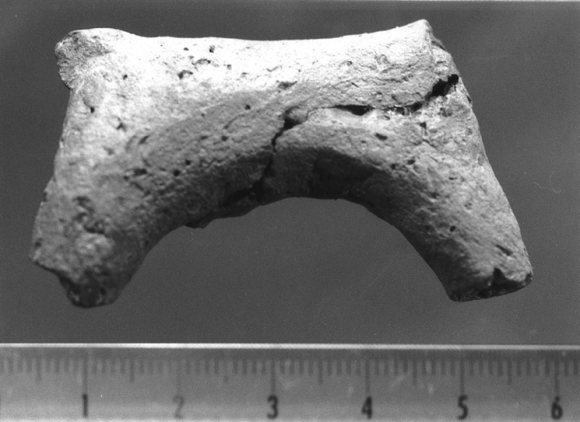
Body of zoomorphic statuette

The Tichitt Tradition spread to the Middle Niger region (e.g., Méma, Macina, Dia Shoma, Jenne Jeno) of Mali where it developed into and persisted as Faïta Facies ceramics between 1300 BCE and 400 BCE among rammed earth architecture and iron metallurgy (which had developed after 900 BCE). During the mid-1st millennium BCE, increasing desertification of the Green Sahara resulted in the migration from the Dhars (e.g., Dhar Tichitt, Dhar Walata, Dhar Néma) of Mauritania. Some pastoralists from Dhar Tichitt may have migrated toward the southeast and other pastoralists may have migrated southward (e.g., Middle Senegal River Valley of Senegal). Dhar Néma may have served as a transitory area for the people of the Tichitt Tradition as the area of Dhar Tichitt started to become vacated by 300 BCE. From Mauritania, the people of the Tichitt Tradition may have migrated into the Malian Lakes Region, Macina, and/or Méma. In the northern areas of Macina and Mema, located in the Middle Niger, lithic items may have been brought from the Dhars (e.g., Dhar Tichitt, Dhar Walata, Dhar Tagant) of Mauritania. By as early as the 3rd or 4th century BCE, migrating pastoralists from Dhar Tichitt may have arrived and dwelt in the regions of the Niger Bend and Niger Delta. As aridification affected Lake Mega Chad, this resulted in the development of a nutrient abundant Lake Chad Basin; consequently, Tichitt culture (e.g., plant materials used to stylize ceramics with a braid and twist design) may have spread into its southern region as pastoralists from Dhar Tichitt peopled the Lake Chad Basin. Some pastoralists may have also peopled the region that would eventually become the Ghana Empire as well as early Awdaghust. In addition to complex social structure and agriculture, tumuli construction may have also spread from Tichitt, through the Inland Niger Delta, to Dogon Country. Following the Tichitt Tradition, in the 1st millennium CE, the pre-state urbanism of southern Mauritania developed into state-based urbanism (e.g., nucleation of peoples and regional specialization) in the western Sudan. Particularly, state-based urbanism in the Middle Niger and the Ghana Empire developed between 450 CE and 700 CE.
