= Middle Niger =

Region of Mali

The Middle Niger is a region of Mali that includes Dia Shoma, Djenné-Djenno, Méma, Macina, and the Malian Lakes Region.

== Dia ==
The settlement complex at Dia consists of an agglomeration of three separate large archaeological sites: Dia-Shoma, Dia, and Dia-Mara. With an area of 49ha, Dia-Shoma is the largest and oldest, dating back to the 9th century BCE.

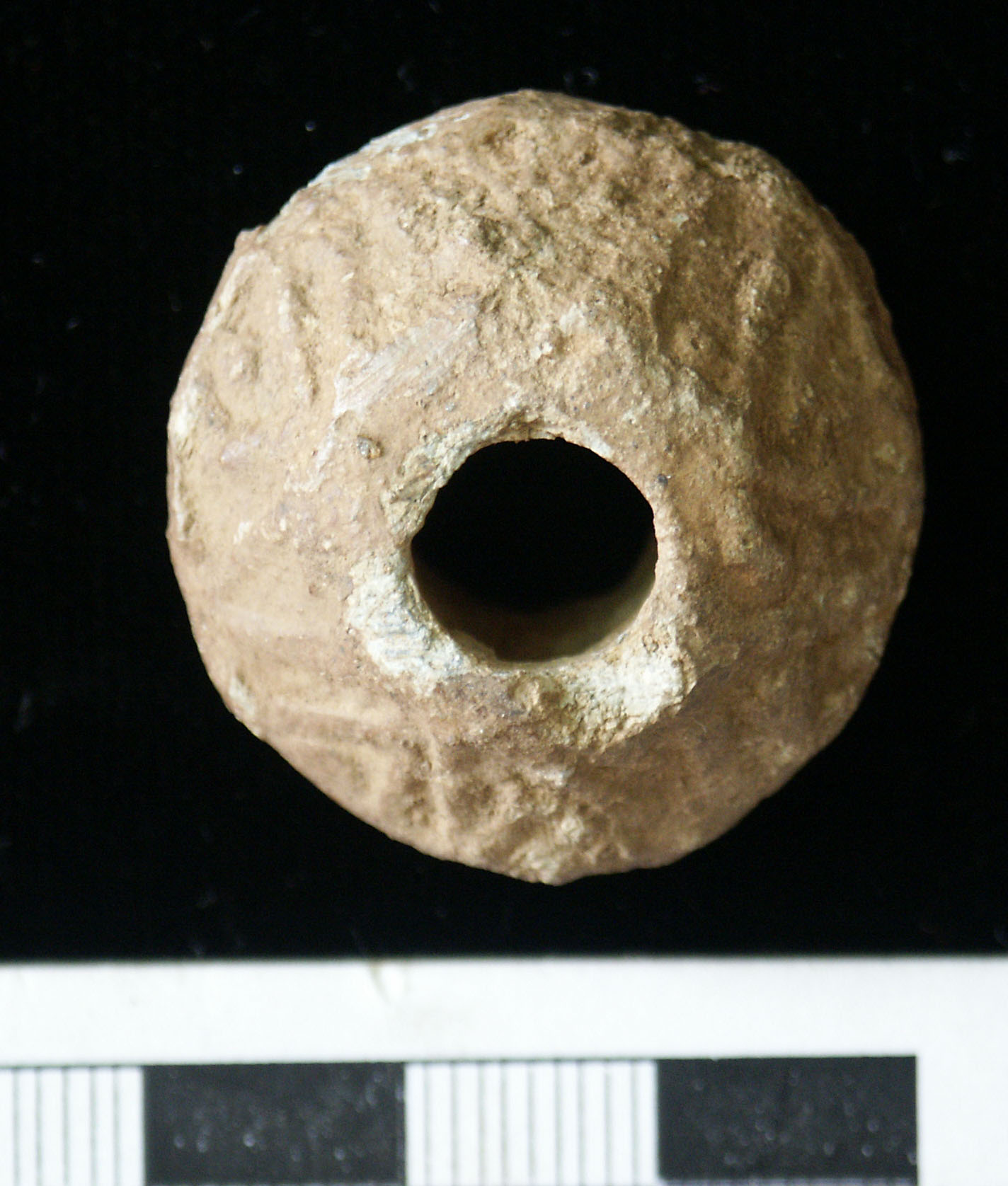
Medieval lead spindle whorl

== Djenné-Djenno ==
The civilization of Djenné-Djenno was located in the Niger River valley in Mali and is considered to be among the oldest urbanized centres and the best-known archaeological sites in Sub-Saharan Africa. The site is located about 3 kilometres (1.9 mi) away from the modern town of Djenné and is believed to have been involved in long-distance trade and possibly the domestication of African rice. The site is believed to exceed 33 hectares (82 acres). The city is believed to have been abandoned and moved to its current location due to the spread of Islam and the building of the Great Mosque of Djenné. Towns similar to Djenné-Jeno also developed at the site of Dia, also in Mali along the Niger River, from around 900 BC. Considerable commonalities, absent in modern North African cultures, are present and able to be found between Round Head paintings and modern Sub-Saharan African cultures. Modern Saharan ceramics are viewed as having clear likenesses with the oldest ceramics found in Djenné-Djenno, which have been dated to 250 BCE. The egalitarian civilization of Djenné-Djenno was likely established by the Mande progenitors of the Bozo people, which spanned from 3rd century BCE to 13th century CE.

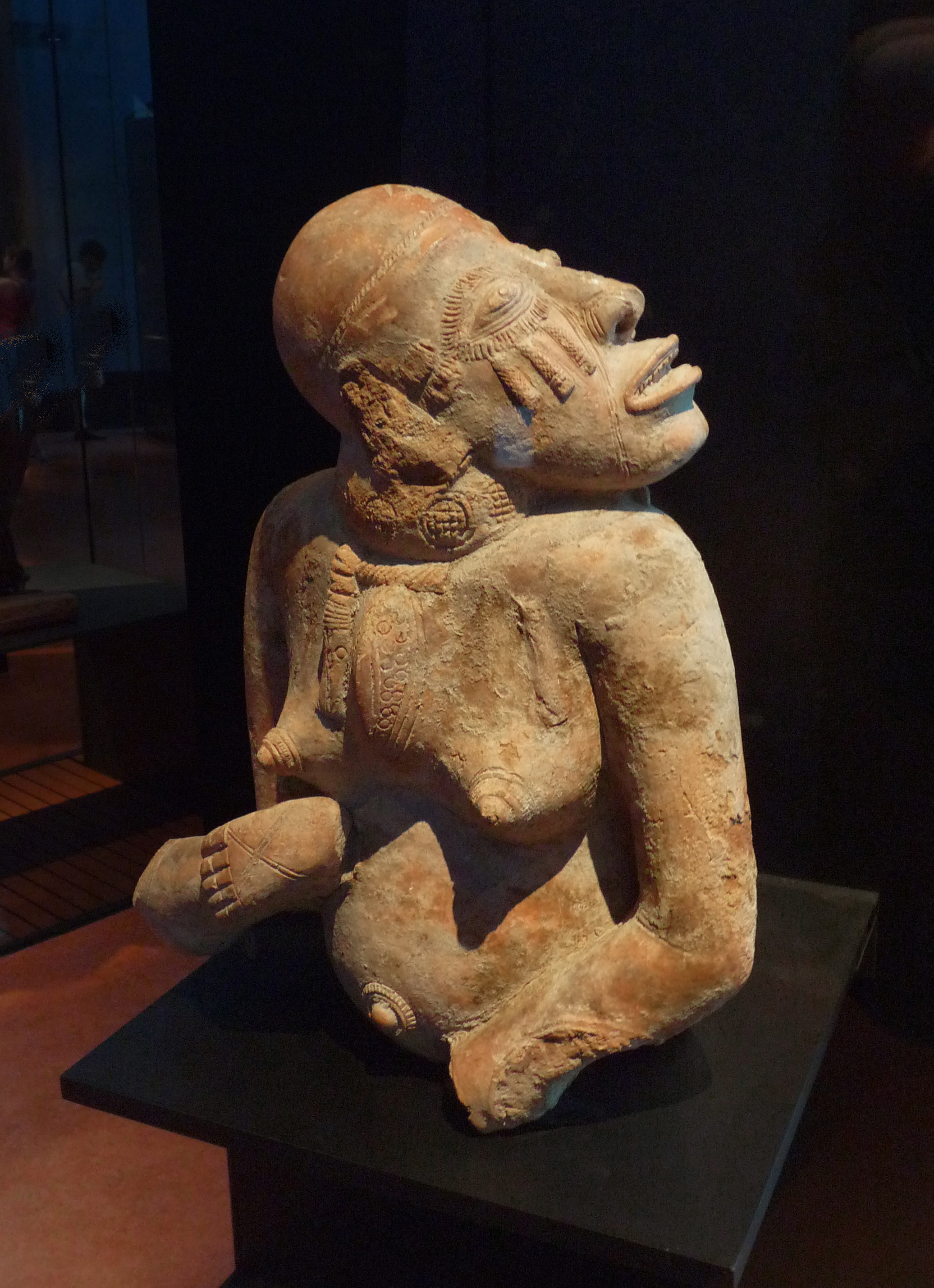
13th–15th century female terracotta figure covered with red ochre

== Macina ==
Macina is a small town and rural commune in the Cercle of Macina in the Ségou Region of southern-central Mali. The commune covers an area of 1,100 square kilometers and contains the main town and 20 villages.

== Malian Lakes Region ==
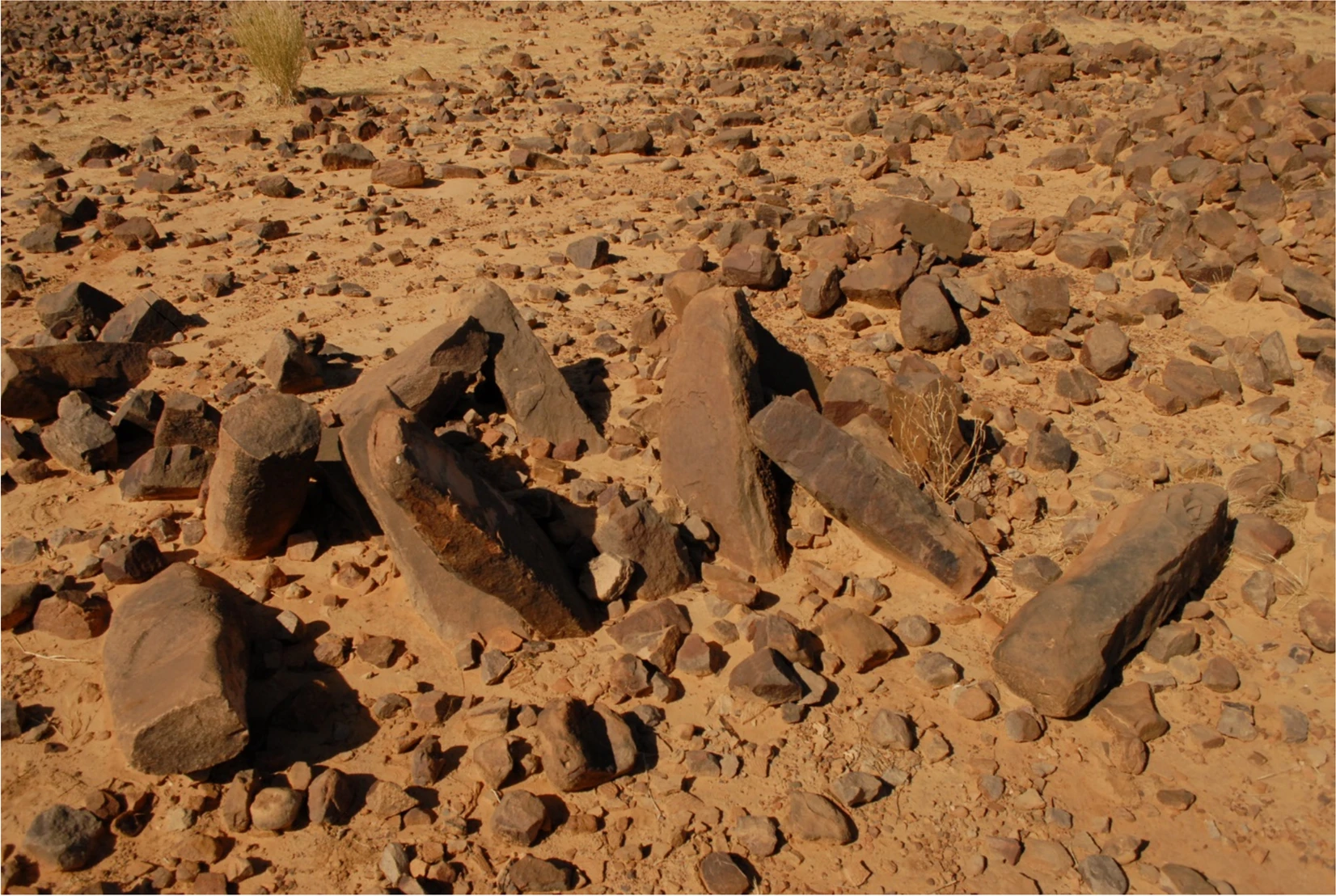
Stone pillar structure at Fati 6

The Malian Lakes Region may have served as the second regional center of the Tichitt Tradition. In the Malian Lakes Region, there is a drystone enclosure that is greater than 4 meters in height and several hundred meters in circumference, two cemeteries, and within the enclosure, a possible cistern building with remnants of a room that is between 6 meters and 7 meters in diameter; there are also other drystone structures of different sizes and kinds, which include a large rectangular enclosure, enclosures with small-sized circular structures, a carved stone as part of a broader system of structures, stone walls, as well as cemeteries with stones positioned in the head and foot areas of the graves. Additionally, there are stones that are 2 meters in diameter are set within circular patterns are found among a few stone structures, grindstone and millstone remnants, and pottery with decorative patterns. Within the region, nearby Tondidarou, a stone wall may have served as a regional boundary, stone tumuli and circles that may be cemeteries, and a couple of drystone fortification remnants; there are also pottery and stone tools at Mobangou, as well as mounds and stone structures nearby Mobangou. On the eastern side of Lake Fati, there are large enclosures on the massifs containing dozens of conjoined circular drystone structures, and on the eastern side of Lake Faguibine, there are similar enclosures and structures spanning 74 kilometers north from its eastern shoreside; there are also stone walls ranging about one meter in height.

The Malian Lakes Region sites share connections with Tichitt Tradition sites via one of its categorized sites. Tell-type site pottery of the Malian Lakes Region also is similar in appearance (e.g., folded strip roulettes, thickened rims) to Faïta pottery. In total, there are 180 villages, hamlets, and many types of stone structures and enclosures. Among the total constructed stone villages, 30 stone villages may have evidence of concessions with stone pillar structures in them; there is also Fati 6 where a drystone tell is of an intermediary architectural status between the earlier drystone structures in the escarpment region and the later drystone structures of the Tondidarou region; both show close resemblance and apparent connection with the architectural structures of the Tichitt culture. The Malian Lakes Region and the Mauritanian Tichitt cultural region bear strong geographic resemblance (e.g., escarpments) and similar complex settlement patterns on and below the escarpments. In the Malian Lakes Region, the stone villages may have been constructed between the 2nd millennium BCE and the 1st millennium BCE. In 1st millennium CE, earthen tells were created in the plains, along the shoresides and in floodplains of the Niger River at Tondidarou; the difference in distance and dates may indicate that there was gradual change in settlement sites, from the regional section of the Malian Lake Region where the escarpments are located toward the regional section where Tondidarou is located, as well as gradual technical shift toward construction of earthen settlement mounds. Altogether, the archaeological evidence on and below the Malian Lakes Region escarpments of the 2nd millennium BCE - 1st millennium BCE may serve as connective evidence between Mema, Tondidarou and other Middle Niger sites of the 1st millennium CE, and the Tichitt Tradition of Mauritania.

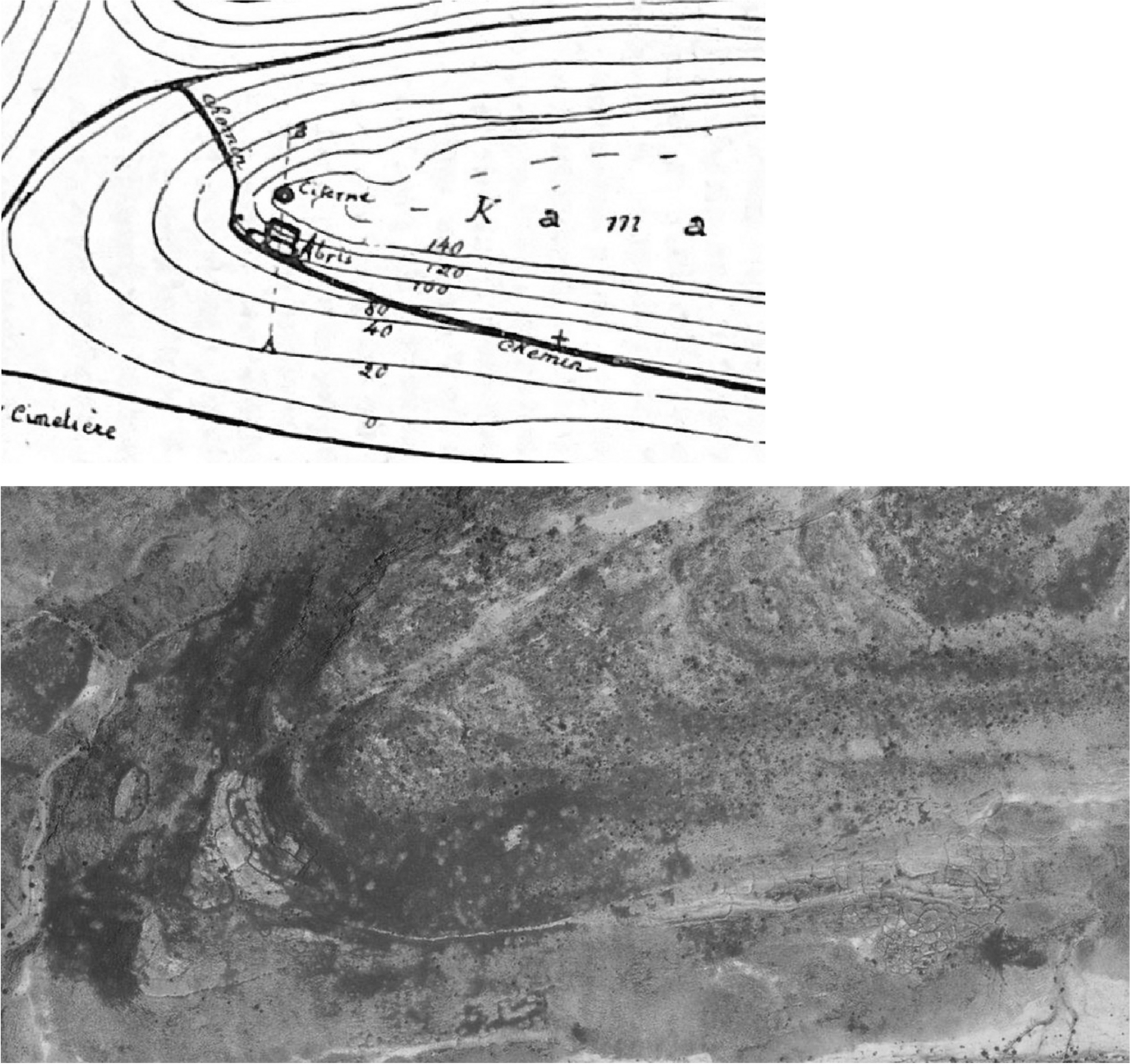
Map and satellite image

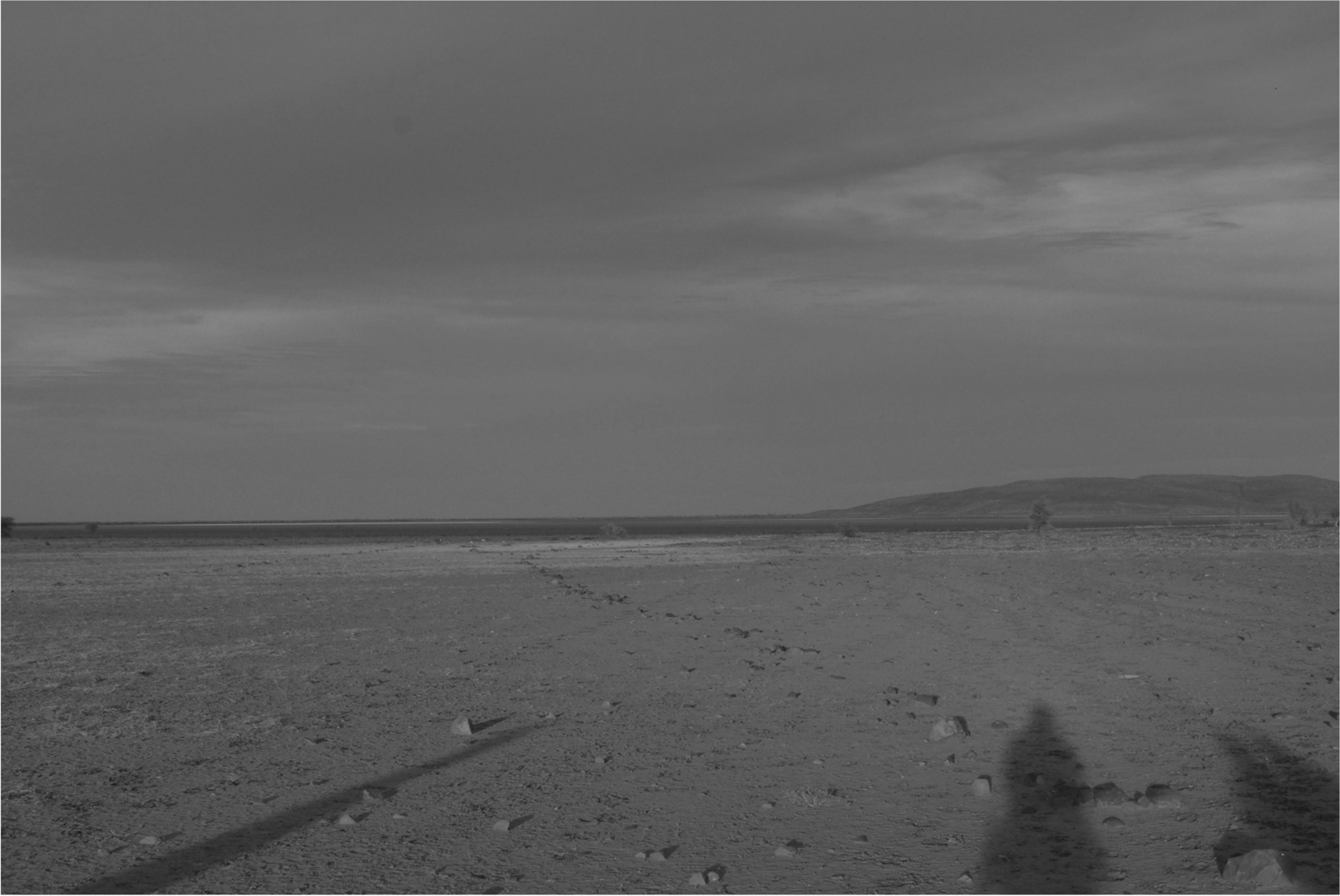
Field boundary on the western shore of Lake Fati

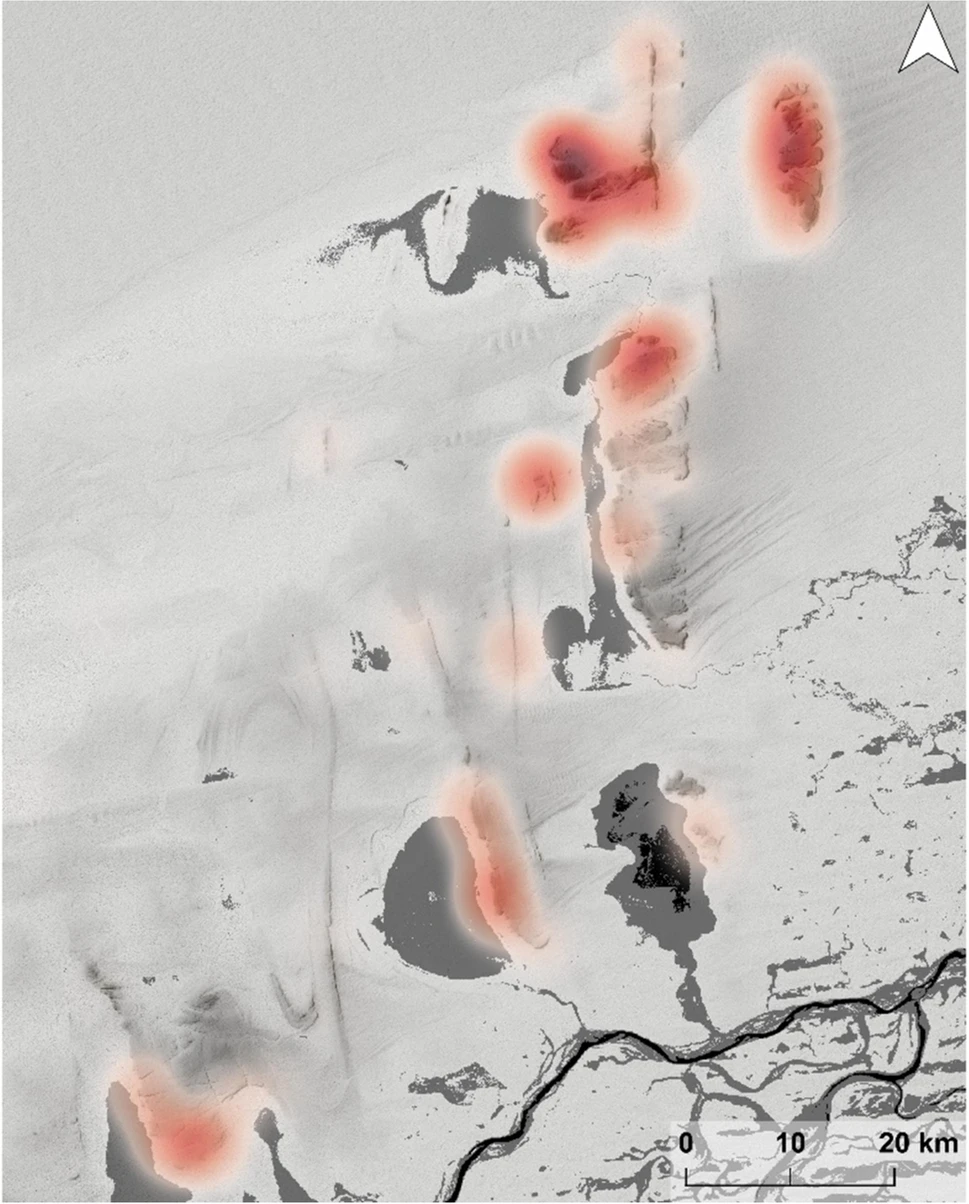
Location densities of sites, showing clear preferences for sandstone escarpments. Permanent water (1984–2021) in black, impermanent water in grey.

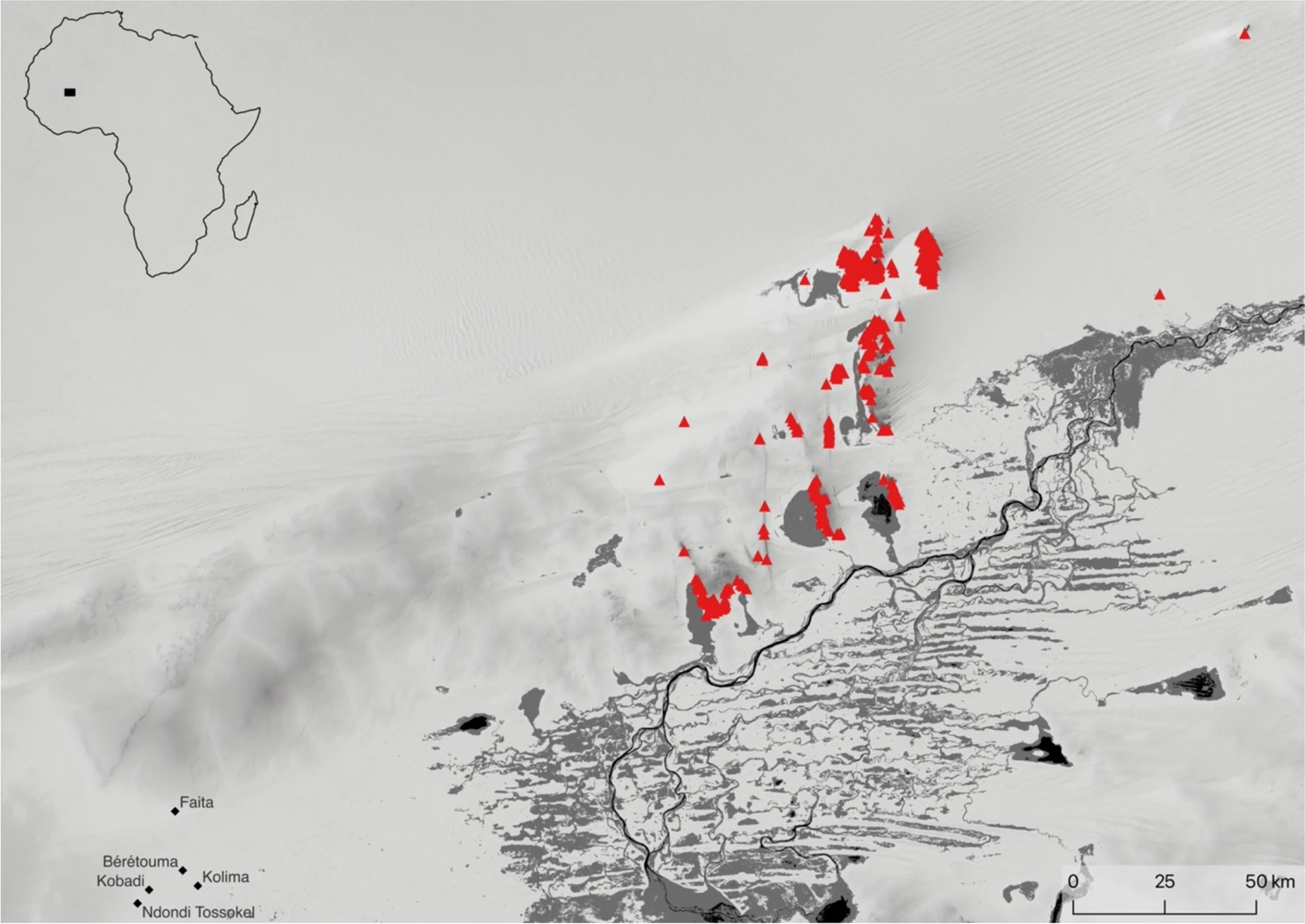
Location of documented sites. Permanent water (1984–2021) in black, impermanent water in grey.

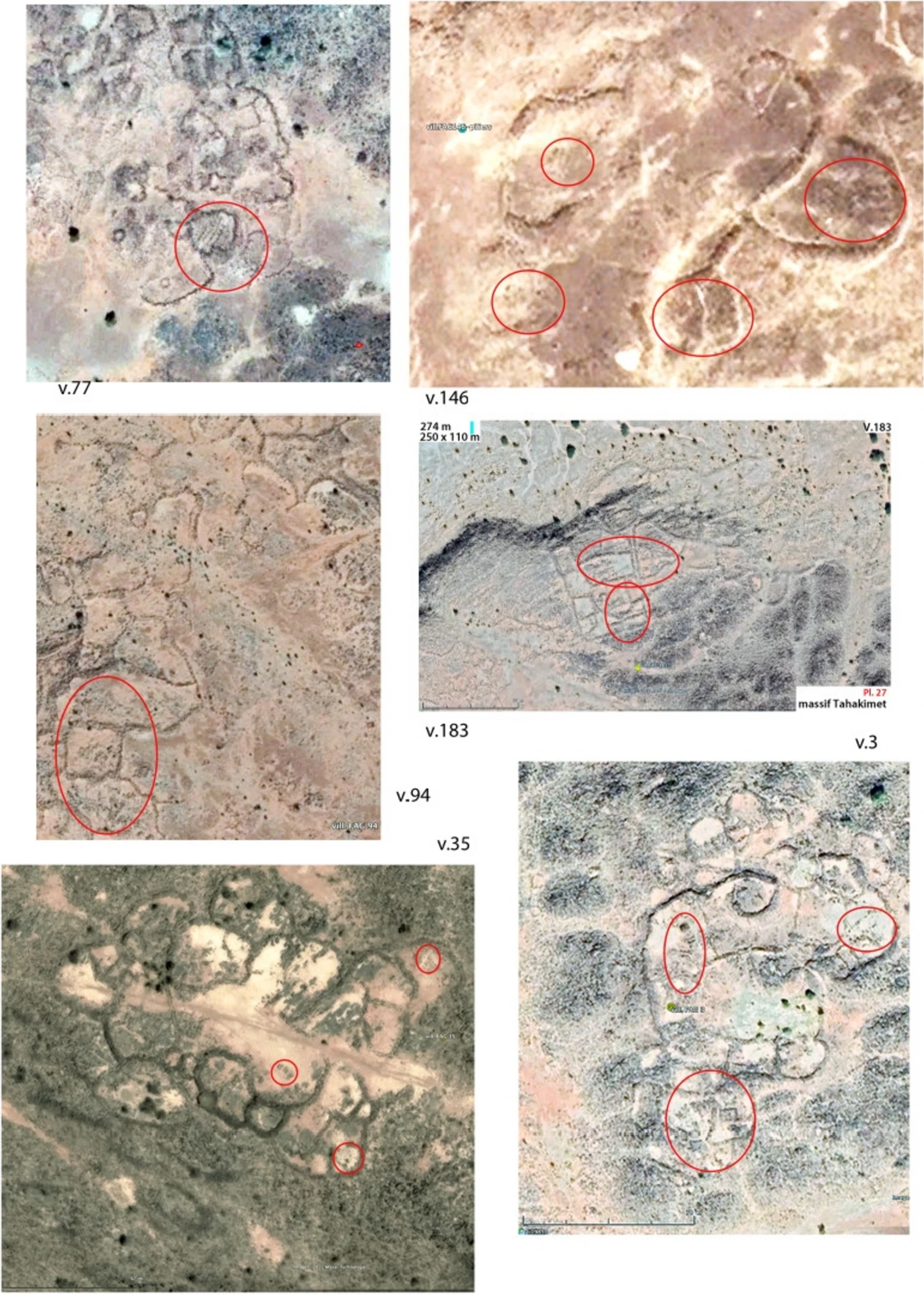
Possible pillar structures in village sites of the Mali Lakes Region

== Méma ==
Toladié, which dates between at least 430 CE and 670 CE, is the largest occupation site (76 hectares) in Mema. As a primary center in the region, Toladié utilized smelted iron tools produced by the communities of Akumbu, Boubou, Boundou, Boulel, Kobadie, Kolima, and Nampala for purposes of tribute and trade with the Ghana Empire.

At the Akumbu mound complex, in Mema, its findings date between 400 CE and 1400 CE; at the cultural deposit of AK3, which contained three human remains, the dates range between 400 CE and 600 CE. While two out of three human remains were in a fully decomposed state, one of the human remains were able to be determined to be a young adult (17–25 years old) female, who was buried with two copper bracelets - one on each wrist, 13 cowrie shells, 11 stone beads, and a fully intact pot.
