= List of lakes of Mali =

This is a list of lakes of Mali, located completely or partially within the country's borders.

== Lakes ==
- Lake Afou
- Lake Al Kamsi
- Lake Arala
- Lake Arandjéou
- Lake Arkaou
- Lake Arodout
- Lake Arona
- Lake Asi Taba
- Lake Bab el Eri
- Lake Bambiré
- Lake Bango
- Lake Baria
- Lake Bella
- Lake Bella Bambi
- Lake Bissoko
- Lake Bongoe
- Lake Bouari
- Lake Bouboutoussembou
- Lake Boudyou
- Lake Bouldi
- Lake Bouncham
- Lake Caytadié
- Lake Chamou
- Lake Chétégoula
- Lake Chibon
- Lake Dao
- Lake Daouat
- Lake Dara
- Lake Dargata
- Lake Daye
- Lake Dayé Dyesse
- Lake Débo
- Lake Débaré
- Lake Diataro
- Lake Dibanti
- Lake Didyéri
- Lake Dienko
- Lake Dingoganyé
- Lake Diori
- Lake Dioulgoul
- Lake Domino Tossokel
- Lake Doro Mare
- Lake Faguibine
- Lake Fatakara
- Lake Fatiha
- Lake Férem
- Lake Féto Maraboulé
- Lake Fobangou
- Lake Fonderé
- Lake Foroudougou
- Lake Gabi
- Lake Galigel
- Lake Galiya
- Lake Garia
- Lake Gassi
- Lake Gomaga
- Lake Gossi
- Lake Goua
- Lake Gougol
- Lake Gounako
- Lake Goundaka
- Lake Goussou
- Lake Guéou
- Lake I-n-Daroua
- Lake I-n-Tetouft
- Lake Ioussa
- Lake Kabara
- Lake Kâde
- Lake Kamne
- Lake Kan
- Lake Kandéfougou
- Lake Kangara
- Lake KanieKobo
- Lake Kanou
- Lake Karangara
- Lake Karsa
- Lake Kati
- Lake Koboro
- Lake Koguié
- Lake Kokorourou
- Lake Kokoungari
- Lake Kondiré
- Lake Kossokosso
- Lake Kouma
- Lake Koumana
- Lake Kounaguel
