= Tondidarou =

- Town
- Location in Mali
- Coordinates: 16°0′43″N 4°06′52″W
- Country: Mali
- Region: Tombouctou Region
- Cercle: Niafunké
- Time zone: UTC+0 (GMT)

Tondidarou is a small town and megalithic archaeological site in Niafunké Cercle, Timbuktu Region, Mali, northwest of Niafunké, about 150 kilometres south-west of Timbuktu. The site, located on the eastern bank of Lac Tagadji, was discovered by Jules Brévié in 1904 and is said to be "defined by three groups of stone megaliths", monoliths which are a "remarkable collection of phalliform stone monuments." Ancient Egypt in Africa refers to the site as "Diop's 'Egypt-influenced' phalliform stone circle of Tondidarou". Eugene Maes was the first to seriously document the stones at Tondidarou in 1924. It was extensively excavated in around 1980. The site is dated to 670 - 790 AD.
