= Bissa language =

Mande language spoken in West Africa

Bissa
- Bisa, Busansi
- Bɩsa
- Region: Burkina Faso, Ghana, Togo
- Ethnicity: Bissa people
- Native speakers: (590,000 cited 1999–2003)
- Language family: Niger–Congo?: Mande; Eastern; Bisa–Busa; Bissa

Official status
- Official language in: Burkina Faso

Language codes
- ISO 639-3: bib
- Glottolog: biss1248
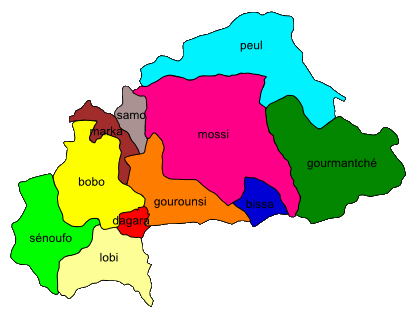
- Majority areas of northern dialects of Bissa, in dark blue, on a map of Burkina Faso.

Bissa or Bisa (endonym: Bɩsa) is the language of the Bissa people, a Mande ethnic group of south-central Burkina Faso, northeastern Ghana and the northernmost tip of Togo. It is a Mande language that is related to, but not the same as, a cluster of languages in the old Borgu Kingdom area of Northeast Benin and Northwest Nigeria, including Busa, Boko, and Kyenga. Alternate names for the Bissa are Busansi, which is used by the Mossi people and Kusasi people, or Busanga.

Bissa is one of the official languages of Burkina Faso alongside Mooré, Dyula, and Fula.

== Names ==
The name is usually spelled Bissa. It can also be spelled Bisa, and the name in the Mossi language is Busansi (singular) or Busanga (plural); This should not be confused with the Bisa language of Zambia or the Busa language of Nigeria and Benin.

== Geographic distribution ==
In Burkina Faso, Bissa is spoken in Boulgou, Koulpélogo, and Kouritenga Provinces of the Centre-Est Region, in Bazaga and Zoundwéogo Provinces of the Centre–Sud Region (Garango, Gomboussougou, Zabré, and Tenkodogo Cities), and in the Boudry Department of Ganzargou Province of the Plateau-Central Region.

In Ghana, Bissa is spoken in Bawku Municipal District, some other parts five districts in Bawku traditional area in the Upper East Region and also some parts in the North East Region.

In Togo, Bissa is spoken in Tône Prefecture of the Savanes Region. There are also some Bissa speakers in Ivory Coast.

== Classification ==
Bissa language is the most populous of the Mande languages of Ghana and Togo. It is part of the Eastern Mande group, which also includes several other languages spoken across the Volta River and the Borgu Kingdom, including Boko, Busa, Samo, and Bokobaru.

=== Dialects ===
Bissa has four dialects:

1. Barka or Baraka (also known as Eastern Bissa)
2. Gormine or Gourmyne closely related to the Barka and mostly speaking in YARGATENGA or YARGATALA
3. Lebre or Zeba (also known as Western Bissa)
4. Leere (also known as Northern Bissa)

The most widely spoken dialects of Bissa are Barka and Lebre.

To the East the Bissa people speak Barka/Baraka. To The West people speak Lebre/Zeba. To the North the Lere dialect is used. To the South, there is no specifics dialect.

== Phonology ==
=== Vowels ===
	Front	Central	Back
Close	i, ĩ		u
Near-close	ɪ, ɪ̃		ʊ, ʊ̃
Close-mid	e		o
Open-mid	ɛ, ɛ̃	ɐ, ɐ̃	ɔ, ɔ̃
Open		a, ã	

=== Consonants ===
		Labial	Alveolar	Palatal	Velar
Nasal		m	n	ɲ	ŋ
Plosive	voiceless	p	t		k
Plosive	voiced	b	d		ɡ
Fricative	voiceless	f	s		
Fricative	voiced	v	z		
Approximant			l	j	w
Trill			r		

== Writing system ==
High tone is marked with an acute accent and low tone is marked with a grave accent. The following is the alphabet of the Lere and Lebir dialects of Bissa:

Bissa alphabet
A	B	C	D	E	Ǝ	Ɛ	F	G	H	I	Ɩ	J	K	L	M	N	Ny	Ŋ	O	Ɔ	P	R	S	T	U	Ʋ	V	W	Y	Z
a	b	c	d	e	ǝ	ɛ	f	g	h	i	ɩ	j	k	l	m	n	ny	ŋ	o	ɔ	p	r	s	t	u	ʋ	v	w	y	z

The following is the alphabet of the Barka dialect of Bissa:

Bissa-Barka Alphabet (Burkina-Faso)
A	B	D	E	Ɛ	Ǝ	F	G	H	I	Ɩ	K	L	M	N	Ɲ	Ŋ	O	Ɔ	P	R	S	T	U	Ʋ	W	Y	Z
a	b	d	e	ɛ	ə	f	g	h	i	ɩ	k	l	m	n	ɲ	ŋ	o	ɔ	p	r	s	t	u	ʋ	w	y	z

== Comparison of dialects ==
Phrase	Leere	Barka/Gourmyne	Lebre
Good morning	Domireh ki	Idomleki	
come	bur	iahh	Eyaham
water	pi	hi	
food	forbile	hobile	

== Lebre or Lere phrases ==
- Good morning: Domireh ki (Response: Domireh zain)
- Good afternoon: Sundareh ki (Response: Sundareh zain)
- Good evening/night: Yirbaa ki (Response: Yirbaa zain)
- Thank you: Barka
- Good: Minga
- Come: Bur
- Go: Ta
- You're welcome: An barka boi
- I love you: Moi wam

== The Busa and Boko of Benin and Nigeria ==
The Busa and Boko are two Eastern Mande groups related to the Bissa people, live in Northwestern Nigeria and Northern Benin near Borgu in the Nigerian States of Niger, Kebbi and Kwara (also the Bokobaru group) and in the Departments of Alibori and Borgou in Benin.

They speak Busa (Bisã) and Boko (also known as Boo). The Busa people are referred to as Bussawa in Hausa.

== See also ==
- Busa language (Mande)
- Boko language
- Kyenga language
- Shanga language
