= Bere =

Bere may refer to:

== Places ==
- Bere, Botswana, a village
- Béré, Burkina Faso, a city
  - Béré Department, containing the city
- Béré, Chad, a city
- Béré Region, Woroba District, Ivory Coast
- Bere Bay, Nunavut, Canada
- Early name for the village of Beercrocombe in Somerset, England
- Alternative spelling for Beer, Somerset in Aller, Somerset, England
- Forest of Bere, Hampshire, England
- Bere or Beara peninsula, Ireland
  - Bere or Bear (barony), County Cork; on the peninsula
  - Bere Island, in the barony
- Bere, the Hungarian name for Berea village, Ciumești Commune, Satu Mare County, Romania
- Castell y Bere, a castle and former town in Wales

== Other uses ==
- Bere (surname) (including a list of people with the name)
- Bere (grain), a barley cultivar

== See also ==
- De la Bere baronets
- Beres (disambiguation)
- Beer (disambiguation)
- Bier (disambiguation)
- Biar (disambiguation)
