= Binde =

Binde may refer to:

== People ==
- Juris Binde (born 1955), a Latvian businessman and president of Latvijas Mobilais Telefons

== Places ==
- Binde, Germany, a village in Altmarkkreis Salzwedel district in the state of Saxony-Anhalt, Germany
- Binde, Norway, a village in Steinkjer municipality in Trøndelag county, Norway
- Binde Department, a department in Zoundwéogo Province, Burkina Faso
- Binde, Burkina Faso, a village in Binde Department in Zoundwéogo Province, Burkina Faso
- Binde, Ghana, a village under North East Region of Ghana; East Mamaprusi Municipality

== See also ==
- Bindi (disambiguation)
