= Mandé peoples =

Ethnic groups who speak the Mande languages

Regions with significant populations
- Mali: As Bambara, Soninke, Maninka, Bobo, Bozo, Khassonke, Juula, Marka
- Guinea: As Malinke, Susu, Kpelle (Guerze), Kissi, Loma, Kuranko, Jahanka, Jallonke, Kono, Mano
- Senegal: As Mandinka, Soninke, Bambara, Jahanka
- Ivory Coast: As Malinke, Dan (Yakuba), Guro, Juula
- Burkina Faso: As Bissa, Bobo, Marka, Juula
- Sierra Leone: As Mende, Kuranko, Kono, Loko, Kissi, Susu, Mandingo, Yallonka
- Liberia: As Kpelle, Mano, Loma, Dan/Gio, Kissi, Vai, Gbandi, Manya, Maninka
- Guinea-Bissau: As Mandinga
- Mauritania: As Soninke
- Nigeria: As Bokobaru, Bussa, Shanga, Kyenga
- The Gambia: As Mandinka, Sarakolle
- Ghana: As Wangara, Ligbi, Bissa
- Benin: As Boko (Boo)

Languages
- Mande languages

Religion
- Predominantly Sunni Islam

Related ethnic groups
- Fula, Songhai, Wolof, Hausa, Gur

The Mandé peoples are a linguistic grouping of those African nations who speak Mande languages. The various Mandé-speaking nations are concentrated in the western regions of West Africa.

The Mandinka or Malinke, a western Mandé nation, are credited with the founding one of the largest West African empires. Other large Mandé-speaking nations include the Soninke and Susu, as well as smaller ones such as the Yalunka, Vai, and Bissa. Mandé-speaking peoples inhabit various environments, from coastal rainforests to the sparse Sahel, and have a wide range of cuisines, cultures, and beliefs.

After migrating from the Central Sahara, Mandé-speaking peoples established Tichitt culture in the Western Saharan region of Mauritania, which had Dhar Tichitt as its primary regional center and possibly the Malian Lakes Region as its secondary regional center. Subsequently, toward the end of the Mauritanian Tichitt culture, Mandé-speaking peoples began to spread and established Méma, Dia Shoma, and Jenne Jeno in the Middle Niger region as well as the Ghana Empire.

Today, Mandé-speaking peoples are predominantly Muslim and follow a caste system. Islam has played a central role in identifying the Mandé-speaking people who live in the Sahel regions. Influences from Mandé-speaking people have historically spread far beyond immediate areas to other neighboring Muslim West African groups who inhabited the Sahel and Savanna. The Mandé people conducted increased trade along the Niger River or overland, and achieved military conquest with the expansion of the Ghana Empire, Mali Empire, Kaabu, and Wassoulou states.

The non-Mandé-speaking Fula, Songhai, Wolof, Hausa, Dogon, and Voltaic peoples share a similar culture with Mandé-speaking peoples.

== History ==
=== Origins ===
E1b1a1-M2 is the predominant paternal haplogroup in West Africa (70-97%). The ancestors of the Mande originally came from Northeast Africa and moved around the Green Sahara. The gradual movement of the Proto Mande to West Africa may have been associated with the expansion of Sahel agriculture in the African Neolithic period, following the desiccation of the Sahara in c. 3500 BCE.

=== Central Sahara ===
After the Kel Essuf Period and Round Head Period of the Central Sahara, the Pastoral Period followed. Some of the hunter-gatherers who created the Round Head rock art may have adopted pastoral culture, and others may have not. As a result of increasing aridification of the Green Sahara, Central Saharan hunter-gatherers and cattle herders may have used seasonal waterways as the migratory route taken to the Niger River and Chad Basin of West Africa. In 4000 BCE, the start of sophisticated social structure (e.g., trade of cattle as valued assets) developed among herders amid the Pastoral Period of the Sahara. Saharan pastoral culture was intricate, as evidenced by fields of tumuli, lustrous stone rings, axes, and other remnants. By 1800 BCE, Saharan pastoral culture expanded throughout the Saharan and Sahelian regions. The initial stages of sophisticated social structure among Saharan herders served as the segue for the development of sophisticated hierarchies found in African settlements, such as Dhar Tichitt.

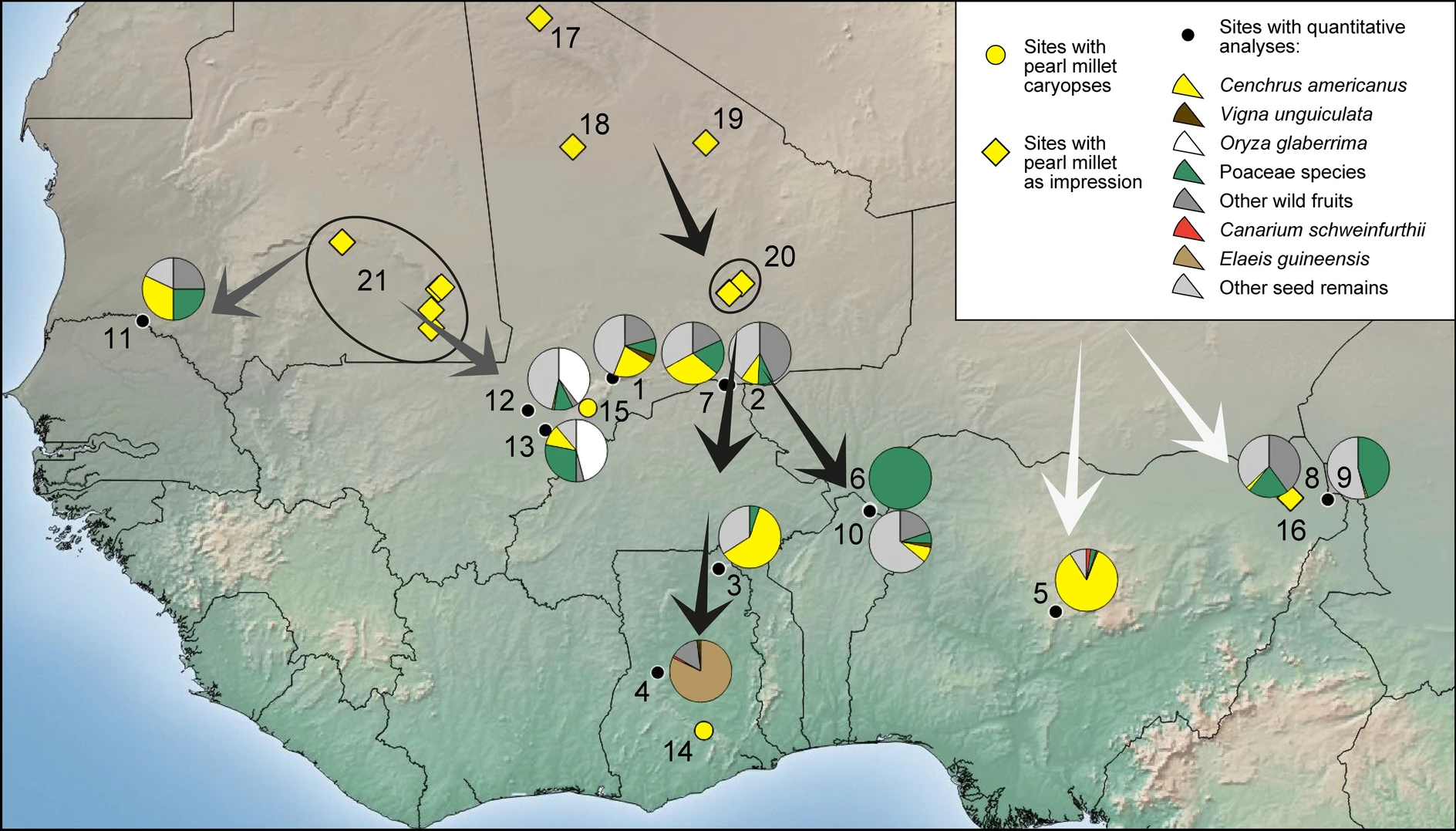
West African sites with archaeobotanical remains from third to first millennium cal bc. The arrows indicate directions of pearl millet diffusion into sub-Saharan West Africa, including 21. Tichitt region sites.

=== Tichitt culture ===
After migrating from the Central Sahara, proto-Mande peoples established their civilization in the Tichitt region of the Western Sahara. The Tichitt Tradition of southeastern Mauritania dates from 2200 BCE to 200 BCE. Tichitt culture at Dhar Néma, Dhar Tagant, Dhar Tichitt, and Dhar Walata included a four-tiered hierarchal social structure, farming of cereals, metallurgy, numerous funerary tombs, and a rock art tradition. At Dhar Tichitt and Dhar Walata, pearl millet may have also been independently tamed amid the Neolithic. Dhar Tichitt, which includes Dakhlet el Atrouss, may have served as the primary regional center for the multi-tiered hierarchical social structure of the Tichitt Tradition, and the Malian Lakes Region, which includes Tondidarou, may have served as a second regional center of the Tichitt Tradition. The urban Tichitt Tradition may have been the earliest large-scale, complexly organized society in West Africa, and an early civilization of the Sahara, which may have served as the segue for state formation in West Africa.

As areas where the Tichitt cultural tradition were present, Dhar Tichitt and Dhar Walata were occupied more frequently than Dhar Néma. Farming of crops (e.g., millet) may have been a feature of the Tichitt cultural tradition as early as 3rd millennium BCE in Dhar Tichitt.

As part of a broader trend of iron metallurgy in the West African Sahel in 1st millennium BCE, iron items (350 BCE – 100 CE) were found at Dhar Tagant, iron metalworking and/or items (800 BCE – 400 BCE) were found at Dia Shoma and Walaldé, and iron remnants (760 BCE – 400 BCE) were found at Bou Khzama and Djiganyai. The iron materials found are evidence of metalworking at Dhar Tagant. In the late period of the Tichitt Tradition at Dhar Néma, tamed pearl millet was used to temper the tuyeres of an oval-shaped low shaft iron furnace, one of 16 located on elevated ground. Iron metallurgy may have developed before the second half of 1st millennium BCE, as indicated by pottery dated between 800 BCE and 200 BCE. At Dhar Walata and Dhar Tichitt, copper was also utilized.

After its decline in Mauritania, the Tichitt Tradition spread to the Middle Niger region of Mali (e.g., at Méma, Macina, Dia Shoma, and Jenne Jeno), where it developed into and persisted as Faïta Facies ceramics between 1300 BCE and 400 BCE among rammed earth architecture and iron metallurgy (which developed after 900 BCE). Thereafter, the Ghana Empire developed in the 1st millennium CE.

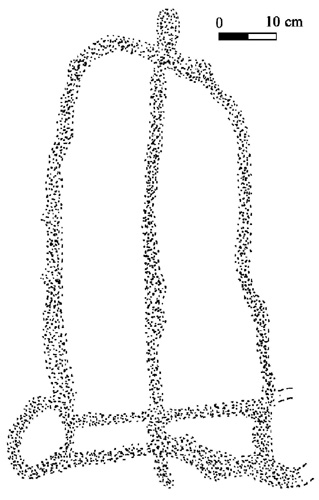
Tichitt Tradition rock art depicting cart, with long platform, framed by two wheels

=== Djenné-Djenno ===
The civilization of Djenné-Djenno was located in the Niger River valley in Mali and is considered to be among the oldest urbanized centres and the best-known archaeological sites in Sub-Saharan Africa. The site is located about 3 kilometres (1.9 mi) away from the modern town of Djenné and is believed to have been involved in long-distance trade and possibly the domestication of African rice. The site is believed to exceed 33 hectares (82 acres). The city is believed to have been abandoned and moved to its current location due to the spread of Islam and the building of the Great Mosque of Djenné. Towns similar to Djenné-Jeno also developed at the site of Dia, also in Mali along the Niger River, from around 900 BC. Considerable commonalities, absent in modern North African cultures, are present and able to be found between Round Head paintings and modern Sub-Saharan African cultures. Modern Saharan ceramics are viewed as having clear likenesses with the oldest ceramics found in Djenné-Djenno, which have been dated to 250 BCE. The egalitarian civilization of Djenné-Djenno was likely established by the Mande progenitors of the Bozo people, which spanned from 3rd century BCE to 13th century CE.

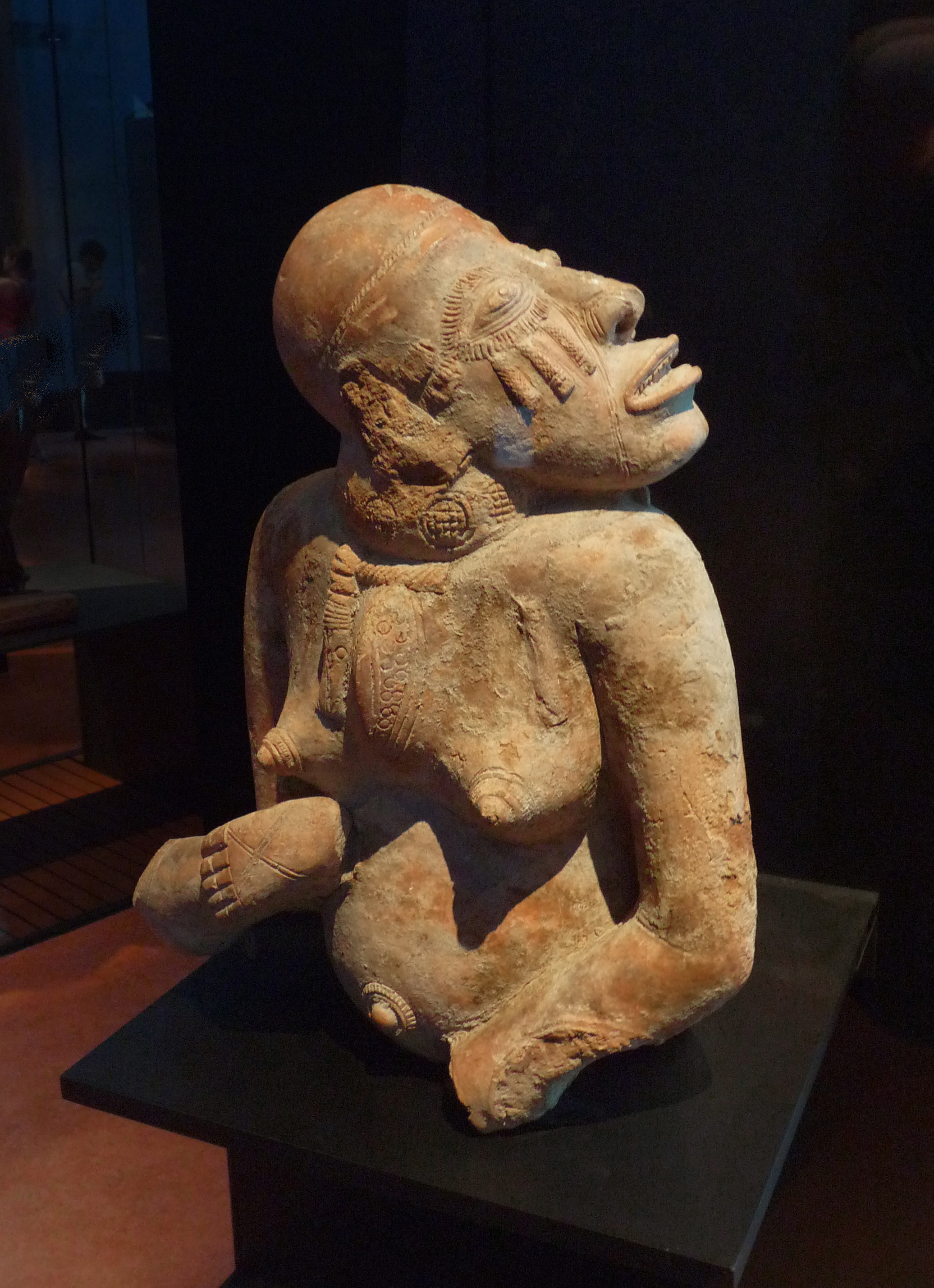
13th–15th century female terracotta figure covered with red ochre

=== Ghana Empire ===
Since around 1500 BCE, a number of clans of proto-Soninke descent, one of the oldest branches of Mandé-speaking peoples, came together under the leadership of Dinga Cisse. The nation comprised a confederation of three independent, freely allied, states (Mali, Mema, and Wagadou) and 12 garrisoned provinces. Located midway between the desert, the main source of salt, and the gold fields of the upper Senegal River to the south, the confederation had a good location to take advantage of trade with the surrounding cities. They traded with the north by a coastal route leading to Morocco via Sijilmasa.

Ghanaian society included large pastoral and agricultural communities. Its commercial class was the most prosperous. The Soninke merchants of Ghana came to dominate the trade, having had Saharan trade routes connecting their great cities of the Sahara and to the northern coast of Africa. They enslaved neighboring Africans, either to sell them or to use them for domestic purposes; those who were not sold were usually assimilated into the Soninke community. Leather goods, ivory, salt, gold, and copper were also sold in exchange for various finished goods. By the 10th century, Ghana was an immensely rich and prosperous empire, controlling an area the size of Texas, stretching across Senegal, Mali, and Mauritania. When visiting the capital city of Kumbi Saleh in 950 AD, Arab traveler Ibn Hawqal described the Ghanaian ruler as the "richest king in the world because of his gold."

In the 11th century, the kingdom began to weaken and decline for numerous reasons. The king lost his trading monopoly, a devastating drought damaged the cattle and cultivation industries, the clans were fractured, and the vassal states were rebelling. According to Arab tradition, Almoravid Muslims came from the North and invaded Ghana.

The western Sanhaja was converted to Islam sometime in the 9th century. They were subsequently united in the 10th century. With the zeal of converts, they launched several campaigns against the "Sudanese", idolatrous Black peoples of West Africa and the Sahel. Under their king Tinbarutan ibn Usfayshar, the Sanhaja Lamtuna erected or captured the citadel of Awdaghust, a critical stop on the trans-Saharan trade route. After the collapse of the Sanhaja union, Awdagust was taken by the Ghana Empire. The trans-Saharan routes were taken over by the Zenata Maghrawa of Sijilmassa

Before the Almoravids, the Islamic influence was gradual and did not involve any form of military takeover. In any event, following their subsequent withdrawal, new gold fields were mined further south and new trade routes were opening further east. Just as it appeared that Ghana would reemerge, it became the target of attacks by the Susu people who were Mandinka (another Mandé-speaking people) and their leader Sumanguru. From this conflict in 1235, the Malinké (also known as Mandinka people) emerged under a new dynamic ruler, Sundiata Kéita. By the mid-13th century, the once great empire of Ghana had utterly disintegrated. It soon became eclipsed by the Mali Empire of Sundiata.

=== Mali Empire ===
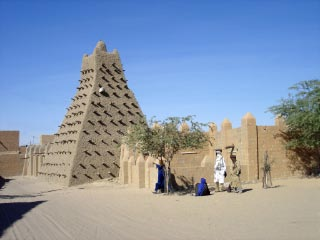
Sankore Mosque

The most renowned Emperor of Mali was Sundiata's grandson, Mansa Musa (1307–1332), also known as “Kan Kan Mussa" or "The Lion of Mali". His pilgrimage to Mecca in 1324 quite literally put Mali on the European map. He took 60,000 porters with him, each carrying 3 kg of pure gold (180 tons in total, according to the UNESCO General History of Africa). He had so much gold that when he stopped in Egypt, the Egyptian currency lost some of its value. According to Cairo-born historian al-Maqurizi, "the members of his entourage proceeded to buy Turkish and 'Ethiopian' slave girls, singing girls and garments, so that the rate of the gold dinar fell by six dirhams." Consequently, the names of Mali and Timbuktu were shown on the 14th-century world map.

In the 12th century CE, the University of Sankore, which began as the Mosque of Sankore, served as an organization of higher learning in Timbuktu. The Mosque of Sankore, the Mosque of Sidi Yahya, and the Mosque of Djinguereber constitute what is referred to as the University of Timbuktu.

In a number of generations, Mali was eclipsed by the Songhai empire of Askia Muhammad I (Askia the Great).

=== Post-Songhai ===
Following the fall of the great Empires of the Northern Mandé-speaking people (Mandinka and Soninke ethnic groups), the presence of other Mandé-speaking people came about. These were the Mane, Southern Mandé speakers (Mende, Gbandi, Kpelle, Loma ethnic groups) who invaded the western coast of Africa from the east during the first half of the 16th century. Their origin was apparent in their dress and weapons (which were observed at the time by Europeans), their language, as well as in Mane tradition, recorded about 1625. The Mane advanced parallel to the coastline of modern Liberia, fighting in turn with each tribal group that they came across. They were almost invariably successful. They did not slow until encountering the Susu, another Mande people, in the north-west of what is now Sierra Leone. The Susu had similar weapons, military organization and tactics.

Painted rock art from Manding peoples are found largely in Mali, where Malinke and Bambara peoples reside. The Manding rock art, developed using black, white, or red paint, is primarily composed of geometric artforms, as well as animal (e.g., saurian) and human artforms. Some of the Manding rock art may relate to circumcision rituals for initiates. During the 15th century CE, migrations from the northern area of Guinea and southern area of Mali may have resulted in the creation of Manding rock art in the northern area of Mali (e.g., Yobri, Nabruk), southeastern area of Burkina Faso (e.g., Takoutala, Sourkoundingueye), and Dogon country.

French colonisation of West Africa greatly affected the life of Mandé-speaking people. Constant wars with the French cost the lives of thousands of their soldiers. They relied increasingly on the Atlantic slave trade for revenues. The later creation of colonial boundaries by European powers divided the population. The Mandé-speaking people are still active in West African politics; Many individuals from Mandé-speaking ethnic groups have been elected as presidents in several states.

Existence amongst the Mandé-speaking peoples concerning conflict with other African ethnic groups has been exacerbated since the start of the 20th century. Because of desertification, they have been forced steadily southward in search of work and other resources. Frequently, the competition has resulted in fighting between them and other indigenous populations along the coast.

== Culture ==
Mandé-speaking ethnic groups typically have patrilineal kinship system and patriarchal society. Several Mandé tribes practice Islam, like the Mandinka and Soninke (though often mixed with indigenous beliefs), and usually observe ritual washing and the daily prayers of Islam. Their women wear veils. The Mandinka in particular practice the social concept of sanankuya or "joking relationship" among clans.

=== Secret societies ===
Amongst the Mende, Kpelle, Gbandi and Loma Mandé-speaking ethnic groups of Sierra Leone and Liberia, there exists secret fraternal orders and sororities, known as Poro and Sande, or Bundu, respectively based on ancient traditions believed to have emerged about 1000 CE. These govern the internal order of their society, with important rites of passage and entry into the gender societies as boys and girls come of age in puberty.

=== Caste system ===
Amongst specific Mandé-speaking ethnic groups, such as the Mandinka, Soninke and Susu, there traditionally exists a caste-based system. Amongst these Mandé-speaking ethnic groups' societies are hierarchies or "caste"-based systems, with nobility and vassals. There were also serfs (Jonw/Jong(o)), often prisoners or captives taken in warfare, and usually from competitors of their territory. The descendants of former kings and generals had a higher status than both their nomadic and more settled compatriots.

Many Mandé-speaking ethnic groups' cultures traditionally have castes of crafts people (including as blacksmiths, leatherworkers, potters, and woodworkers/woodcarvers) and bards (the latter being known in several European languages as griots). These craft and bardic castes are collectively called "nyamakala" among peoples of Manding branch of the Mandé-speaking family (Mandinka people), and "Nyaxamalo" among the Soninke people,

Mandé-influenced caste systems, and elements thereof, sometimes spread, due to Mande influences, to non-Mandé-speaking ethnic groups (in and near regions where Mande cultures settled) and were adopted by certain non-Mande peoples of Senegal, parts of Burkina Faso, northern Ghana, and elsewhere the Western Sudan and Western Sahel regions of West Africa. Among the non-Mande Wolof people, craft and bardic castes were collectively termed "nyeno".

With time, in many cases, status differences have eroded, corresponding to the economic fortunes of the groups. Although the Mandé arrived in many of their present locations as raiders or traders, they gradually adapted to their regions. In the 21st century, most work either as settled agriculturalists or nomadic fishermen. Some are skilled as blacksmiths, cattle herders, and griots or bards.

=== Fadenya ===
Fadenya or “father-childness” is a word used by the Manding, a Mandé-speaking people (e.g., Mandinka), originally to describe the tensions between half-brothers with the same father and different mothers. The concept of fadenya has been stretched and is often used to describe the political and social dynamism of the Mandé world. Fadenya is often discussed in contrast to badenya, or mother-childness.

=== Oral tradition ===
Amongst the Mandinka, Soninke and Susu Mandé-speaking ethnic groups' cultures, history is passed orally, one famous instance being the Epic of Sundiata of the Mandinka. Among the Mandinka, and some closely related groups, teaching centers known as kumayoro teach the oral histories and techniques under keepers of tradition known as nyamankala. These nyamankala form an important part of Mandinka culture due to their role in preserving oral tradition. Kela school, the most notable, is vital in perpetuating oral tradition. Because of their strong work, the versions of the Sundiata epic tend to be fairly similar. The Kela version is considered the official one, and the epic is performed every seven years. The Kela version includes a written document called a tariku. This intersection of written and oral history is unique to Mandinka culture.

The epic is typically performed in two ways: one is intended for teaching or rehearsing, and the other is more official, intended to convey the important information to a large audience. Part of the teaching performance involves the presentation of gifts from clans involved in the epic. The official version can use a musical instrument; it does not allow audience interruptions. Different Mandé clans play different instruments in their performances of the epic.

The Kandasi also started a school for oral history.

=== Literature ===
Mandé literature includes the Epic of Sundiata, an epic poem of the Manding peoples (a branch of Mande family) recounting the rise of Sundiata Keita, the founder of the Mali Empire. Ethnomusicologist Eric Charry notes that these tales "form a vast body of oral and written literature" ranging from Ibn Khaldun's 14th-century Arabic-language account to French colonial anthologies collecting local oral histories to modern recordings, transcriptions, translations, and performance. Tarikh al-Fattash and Tarikh al-Sudan are two important Timbuktu chronicles. By the late 1990s, there were reportedly 64 published versions of the Epic of Sunjata. Although traditionally attributed to Mahmud Kati, Tarikh al-Fattash was written by at least three different authors. Among the Mandé-speaking ethnic groups, such as the Mandinka, Soninke and Susu, griots are a group, traditionally a specialized caste who are bards, storytellers, and oral historians.

=== Religion ===
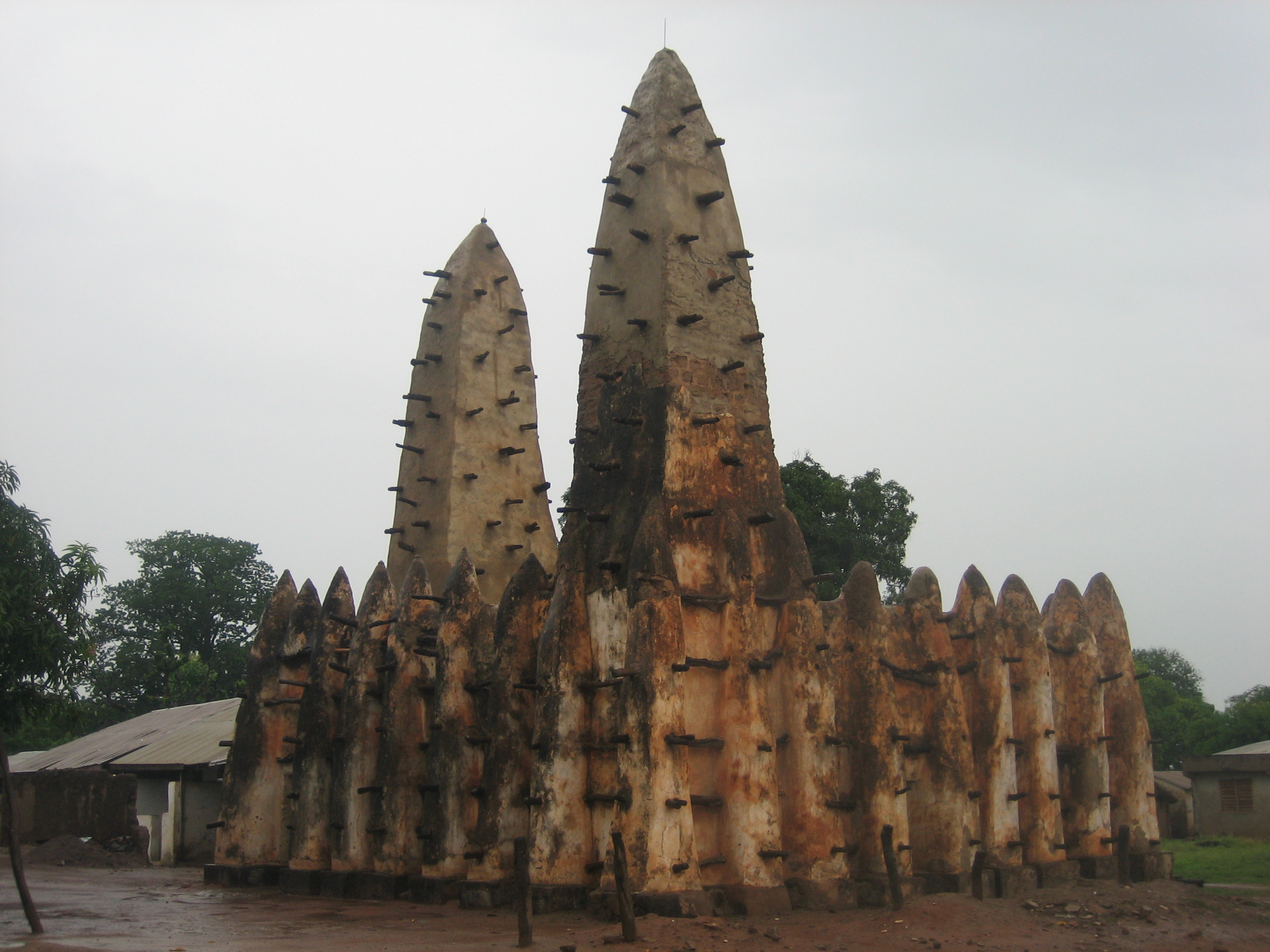
A 13th-century mosque in northern Ghana attributed to the Wangara.

Many of the Mandé-speaking ethnic groups in the westernmost part of West Africa have been predominantly Muslim since the 13th century. Others, such as the Bambara, a Mandinka group, converted to Islam as late as the 19th century with some retaining their traditional beliefs. Muslim Mandinka also hold traditional beliefs, such as in the rituals of initiation groups like Chiwara, and Dwo, and beliefs in the power of nyama (a spiritual power existing in nature). Many smaller Mandé-speaking ethnic groups, such as the Bobo, retain pre-Islamic belief systems in their entirety.

According to oral histories, Mandé-speaking people, in particular the Soninke ethnic group, contributed through trade and settlement to the Islamization of non-Mandé Gur groups at the edge of the Sahel in West Africa.

=== Arts ===
Much Mandé art is in the form of jewelry and carvings. The masks associated with the fraternal and sorority associations of the Marka and the Mendé are probably the best-known, and finely crafted in the region. The Mandé also produce beautifully woven fabrics which are popular throughout western Africa. They also create gold and silver necklaces, bracelets, armlets, and earrings. The Bambara people and related groups also traditionally produce wooden sculpture. And sculpture in wood, metal, and terra-cotta, have been found, associated with ancient peoples related to the Soninke in Mali.

The bells on the necklaces are of the type believed to be heard by spirits, ringing in both worlds, that of the ancestors and the living. Mandé hunters often wear a single bell, which can be easily silenced when stealth is necessary. Women, on the other hand, often wear multiple bells, representative of concepts of community, since the bells ring harmoniously together.

Djenné-Djenno, an ancient city on the Niger River in central Mali built by Soninke-related peoples, is famous for its terracotta figurines which depict humans and animals including snakes and horses, some dating to the first millennium and early second millennium AD. It is believed that these statuettes served a ritual function and hypothesized that some are the representations of household or ancestral spirits, as ancestral cults are known to have flourished in the area as late as the 20th century.

=== Music ===
The best known type of traditional music amongst the Mandé-speaking people is played on the kora, a stringed instrument with 21 or more strings mainly associated by the Mandinka people. It is performed by families of musicians known in Mandinka as Jeliw (sing. Jeli), or in French as griots. The kora is a unique harp-lute with a notched wooden bridge. It is arguably the most complex chordophone of Africa.

The N'goni is the ancestor of the modern banjo, and is also played by jelis.

Griots are professional bards in northern West Africa, keepers of their great oral epic traditions and history. They are trusted and powerful advisors of Mandinka leaders. Among the most celebrated of these today are Toumani Diabate, Mamadou Diabate, and Kandia Kouyaté.

== See also ==
- Griot
- Djembe
- N'goni
- Kora (instrument)
- List of Mandé peoples of Africa
- Mande Studies Association
- Mande languages
- Tichitt Culture
- Ghana Empire
- Djenne-Djenno
- Mali Empire
- Sosso Empire
- Bambara Kingdom
- Kaabu Empire
- Wassoulou Empire
- Kong Empire
- Borgu Emirate
- Gwiriko
- Manneh Warriors
- Nyamakala
- Fadenya
- Sofa Soldiers
