= Eastern Mande languages =

Eastern Mande
- Eastern Eastern Mande
- Geographic distribution: Burkina Faso, Ghana, Togo, Benin, Nigeria, Ivory Coast, Mali
- Linguistic classification: Niger–Congo?: Mande; Southeastern Mande; Eastern Mande
- Subdivisions: Samo–Busa; Bissa

Language codes
- Glottolog: east2697

The Eastern Mande languages (called Eastern Eastern Mande by Kastenholz, and Niger–Volta by Schreiber and also known as the Bisa–Busa languages) are a branch of the Mande languages spoken in seven areas: northwest Burkina Faso, the border region of northern Benin and Nigeria, and one language, Bissa, also spoken in Ghana, Togo, and Ivory Coast and the Samo languages also spoken in Mali.

== Member languages ==
- Bissa, spoken in Burkina Faso, Ghana, Togo, and Ivory Coast
- Boko of Benin and Nigeria
- Busa of Nigeria and Benin
- Bokobaru of Nigeria
- Samo languages (Sane, San, Sa) of Burkina Faso and Mali
- Shanga, spoken in Nigeria
- Tyenga (Kyenga), spoken in Benin and Nigeria.

== Classification ==
The following internal classification is from Dwyer (1989, 1996), as summarized in Williamson & Blench 2000.

- East Mande
  - Samo–Busa
    - Samo languages
    - Busa languages
      - Busa–Boko
      - Shanga–Tyenga
  - Bissa

Vydrin (2009) places San (Samo) with Bisa.

== See also ==
- Proto-Niger-Volta reconstructions (Wiktionary)
