= Bisa language =

Bisa may refer to:

- Bisã language
- Bissa language
- a dialect of Lala-Bisa language
