= Bissa people =

Ethnic group in West Africa

Bissa
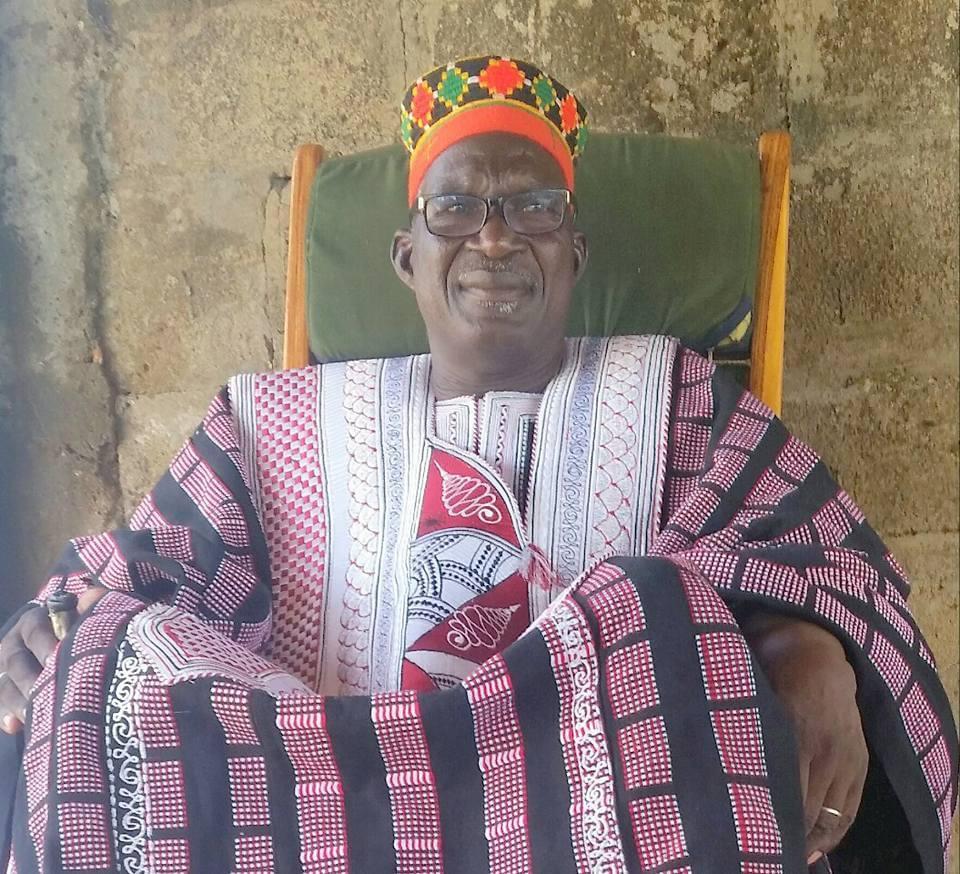
- Bissa Chief of Gomboussougou, Burkina Faso

Total population
- 3.5 million

Regions with significant populations
- Ghana: 1.1 million
- Burkina Faso: 2.3 million
- Togo: 364,747
- Nigeria: 234,678

Languages
- Bissa, French

Religion
- Islam

Related ethnic groups
- other Mandé peoples

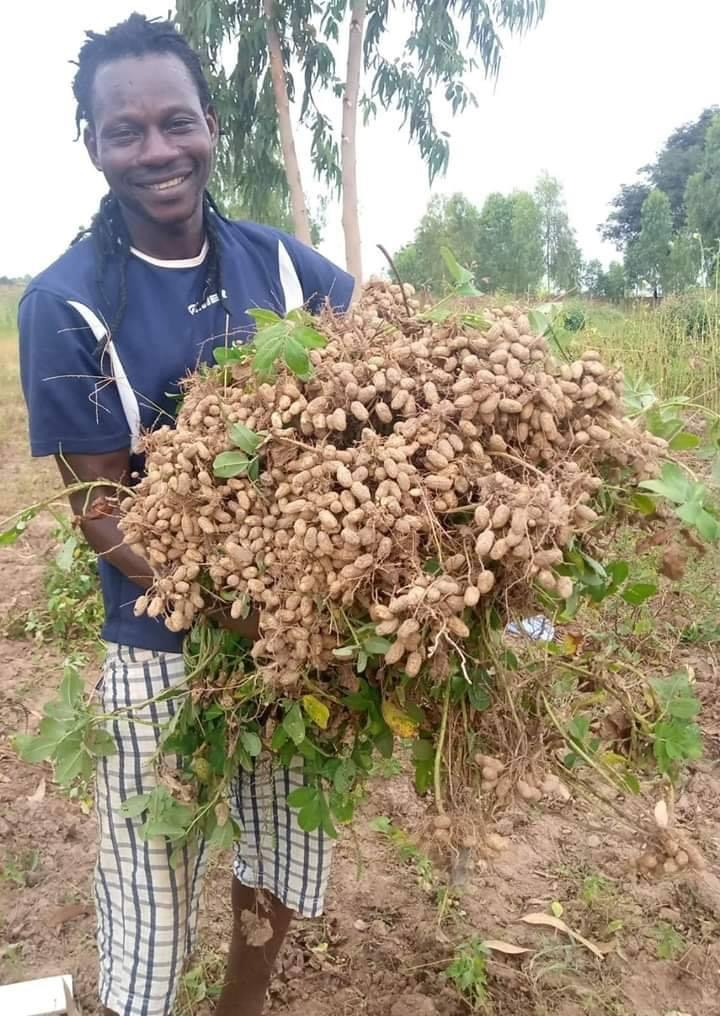
Peanut harvest in a Bissa village.

The Bissa (or Bisa (singular), Bisan, Bissanno (plural)) are a Mande ethnic group of south-central Burkina Faso, northeastern Ghana and the northernmost tip of Togo. Their language, Bissa, is a Mande language that is related to, but not the same as, a cluster of languages in the old Borgu Kingdom area of Northeast Benin and Northwest Nigeria, including Busa, Boko, and Kyenga. An alternate name for the Bissa is Busansi or Busanga which is used by the Mossi people.

Daniel McFarland's Historical Dictionary of Upper Volta refers to them as "intrusive Mande who settled the area along the White Volta below Tenkodogo by 1300. Some live across the border in modern northern Ghana and Togo. According to some traditions, Rialle, progenitor of the Nakomse line of Mossi rulers was Busansi."

They are known for their cultivation of peanuts. Traditionally, a Bissa man who wants to court a Bissa girl must work in her mother's peanut field and be able to provide the girl with her own peanut field if they get married.

The Bissa are divided in four language groups, that is the Barka,Gormine the Lebir and the Lere. They are further divided into several clans. Each clan has a name and an appellation normally called dedaa by the Bissa. The appellation is now used as a surname in Burkina Faso. Bissa make up 2/5th of the Burkina Faso population.

Some Bissa live in Ivory Coast.

== The Busa and Boko peoples of Benin and Nigeria ==
The Busa and Boko peoples, two Eastern Mande groups related to the Bissa people, live in Northwestern Nigeria and Northern Benin near Borgu in the Nigerian States of Niger, Kebbi and Kwara (also Bokobaru group) and in the Beninese Departments of Alibori and Borgou.

They speak Busa (Bisã) and Boko (also known as Boo). The Busa people are referred to as Bussawa in Hausa.

== Notable clans and appellations ==
The Bissa people are divided into numerous clans. Their primary dialects include Barka, Lere and Lebir, each with slight variations.

Most Bissa people are Muslim. The Bissa of the Garango Circle are among the most representative of the northern group. The township of Garango, which serves as the center of the northern Bissa population, remained independent, while the northwestern districts fell under the influence of the Mossi Kingdom of Ouagadougou and the northeastern townships under the supervision of the Mossi Kingdom of Tenkodogo.

In Accra, Ghana, several towns are notable for their Bissa populations. These include Busanga Line in the North Kaneshie area of the Okai Koi constituency, as well as Town Council Line (Lartebiokorshie) and Shukura in the Ablekuma Central constituency. Nima, located in the Ayawaso Central constituency, is another significant Bissa settlement.

Within Bissa society, the Lingani clan holds both political and mystical power. The authority does not rest with the individual who wears the crown, but rather with the one who bestows it. No one can assume power or wear the crown without first undergoing mystical preparation by the Lingani clan in Tangaré (a village in Garango, Boulgou Province, Burkina Faso). The Lingani are traditionally hunters, and a ceremonial fig tree, along with an ancestral hunting spear dating back centuries, remains near Tangaré Mountain, facing the Lingani family residence.

Bissa burial practices reflect a deep connection to their ancestors. Deceased family members are buried in front of their homes as a means of honoring them. Bissa graves are constructed in the shape of traditional dwellings but are built underground, with a small opening for the body's entry. A designated individual receives the body and lays it to rest inside. Multiple family members may be interred in the same grave, and the entrance is sealed with a clay vessel, which can be removed when needed for future burials.

According to Bissa tradition, their ancestor Barso was a hunter.

List of notable clans with their appellations
The Clan	Appellations
Pagou	Nombre/Ziginni
Gassuogou	Yaalah
Tangari	Lengani
Tangaré	Lingani
Garango	Bambara
Tunugu	Saare
Bussim	Guerm/Guerne
Sandugu	Zeba
Lergu	Jinko
Ziglah	Bandau
Pakala	Billa
Tuuro	Dabre
Woono	Zaare
Saawunno	Nyenni
Chenno	Yabre
Bura	Zuure
Sarugu/Saror	Sare/Zanze
Muungo	Gamine
Kayo	Gampine
Bugula	Darga
Gulagun	Nombone
Yiringu	Galbane
Lengi	Monnie
Kadpugu	Yankini
Ganni	Samandulugu
Jangani	Guengane
Bedega	Wandaago
Leda	Zampaligidi
Woono	Wango
longa	Welgu/Keera
Sasima	Daboni
Zangila	Kidibari
Kuu	Lenkoni
Zaka	Boibani
Hunzaawu	Zombra
Bergu	Baara
Nyaawu	Campaore
Gulanda	Bayere
leere	Zampoo
Dansanga	Genni
Somma	Zakaani
Sominne	Senre/Sebene
Gudu	Sewonner
Sonno	Lembani
Wargu	Bansi
Tollah	Bansi
Wanda	Gulla
Dansanga	Genni
Zhetta	Zesonni
Koonteega	Yourda
Bangu	Sambare
Youngou	Gambo
Gerrimah	Nyenni
Kerimah	Ziigani
Yakungu	Gengani
Gangila	Nunkansi
Kele	Gansani
Tinga	Bidiga
Bann	Zanni
