= Busa language (Mande) =

Mande language of Nigeria and Benin

Busa
- Bisã
- Native to: Nigeria, Benin
- Ethnicity: Bissa people
- Native speakers: 110,000 (2012)
- Language family: Niger–Congo?: Mande; Eastern; Bisa–Busa; Samo–Busa; Busa languages; Busa–Boko; Busa

Language codes
- ISO 639-3: Either: bqp – Busa bus – Busa-Bokobaru
- Glottolog: busa1253 Busa boko1267 Bokobaru

Busa
- Person: Busa
- People: Busano
- Language: Bisã

Busa, or Bisã, is the Mande language of the former Borgu Emirate in northwestern Nigeria and northern Benin. It is called Busanci in Hausa, and has also been called Zugweya.

== Names ==
Busa language can be better known as Busa, but it is also known with the native name Bisã or with the Hausa name Busanci (also spelled Busanchi, Bussanci or Bussanchi). This is extremely similar to the Busa language of Papua New Guinea or the related Bissa language of Burkina Faso, Ghana and Togo.

The Mande branch consists of Soninke, Songhai, and Mandika branches that slowly evolved due to slavery.

One person or speaker is called a Busa and more persons/speakers are called Busano and the language of the Busano/Bussawa people is called Bisã.

The Busa people are one of two subgroups of the Bissa people, the other being the Boko people, who speak the Boko language. They are not a clan but a subgroup. They are related to the Bariba people, who speak the Bariba language, which is a Gur language. The Bissa people proper speak the Bissa language, which is closely related to Busa.

== Geographic distribution ==
In Nigeria, Busa is spoken in Borgu Local Government Area of Niger State, in Bagudo LGA of Kebbi State, and in Baruten LGA of Kwara state. The Busa people are referred to as Bussawa in Hausa.

The Bokobaru dialect (or Bokhobaru) is spoken in Kayama and Baruten LGA's, Kwara state.

In Benin, Busa is spoken in the north bordering Nigeria.

Busa language is spoken in regions such as New Bussa, and Bokobaru is dominant in Kaiama.

The Bariba language is also spoken in the region.

== Classification ==
Busa is a Mande language. It is part of the Eastern Mande group, which also includes several other languages spoken across the Volta River and the Borgu Kingdom, including Boko, Bissa, and Samo. Bokobaru is a dialect.

== As a second language ==
Speakers of Laru and Lopa, which are Kainji languages, also speak the Busa language and are shifting to it. Hausa is also spoken.

== Orthography ==
Busa language has 32 letters (Aa, Ãã, Bb, Cc, Dd, Ee, Ɛɛ, Ɛ̃ɛ̃, Ff, Gg, Hh, Ii, Ĩĩ, Jj, Kk, Ll, Mm, Nn, Oo, Ɔɔ, Ɔ̃ɔ̃, Pp, Rr, Ss, Tt, Uu, Ũũ, Vv, Ww, Yy, Zz) and 25 digraphs (Aa aa, Ãa ãa, Ee ee, Ẽe ẽe, Ɛɛ ɛɛ, Ɛ̃ɛ ɛ̃ɛ, Gb gb, Ii ii, Ĩi ĩi, Kp kp, Oo oo, Ɔ̃ɔ ɔ̃ɔ, Uu uu, Ũu ũu, gw, mb, mp, nd, ng, nk, ns, nt, nz).

High tones are marked with an acute accent and low tones are marked with a grave accent.

== Phonology ==
=== Consonants ===
Busa Consonant Phonemes
		Labial	Dental/ Alveolar	Palatal	Velar	Labial-velar	Glottal
Nasal		/m/ m	/n/ n				
Plosive	voiced	/b/ b	/d/ d		/ɡ/ g	/ɡ͡b/ gb, /gʷ/ gw	
Plosive	voiceless	/p/ p	/t/ t		/k/ k	/k͡p/ kp	
Plosive	Pre Nasalized Voiced	/ᵐb/ mb	/ⁿd/ nd		/ᵑɡ/ ng		
Plosive	Pre Nasalized Voiceless	/ᵐp/ mp	/ⁿt/ nt		/ᵑk/ nk		
Fricative	voiceless	/f/ f	/s/ s				/h/ h
Fricative	voiced	/v/ v	/z/ z				
Fricative	Pre Nasalized Voiced		/ⁿz/ nz				
Fricative	Pre Nasalized Voiceless		/ⁿs/ ns				
Approximant			/l/ l	/j/ y		/w/ w	
Flap			/ɾ/ r				

=== Vowels ===
Busa uses /a, e, ɛ, i, o, ɔ, u/ with nasalization and length distinction. Length is represented with a double vowel and everything else is written the way it is in the IPA.

== See also ==
- Bissa language
- Boko language
- Kyenga language
- Shanga language
