= Béré Department =

Coordinates: 11.8333°N 1.1500°W

Bere
- Department
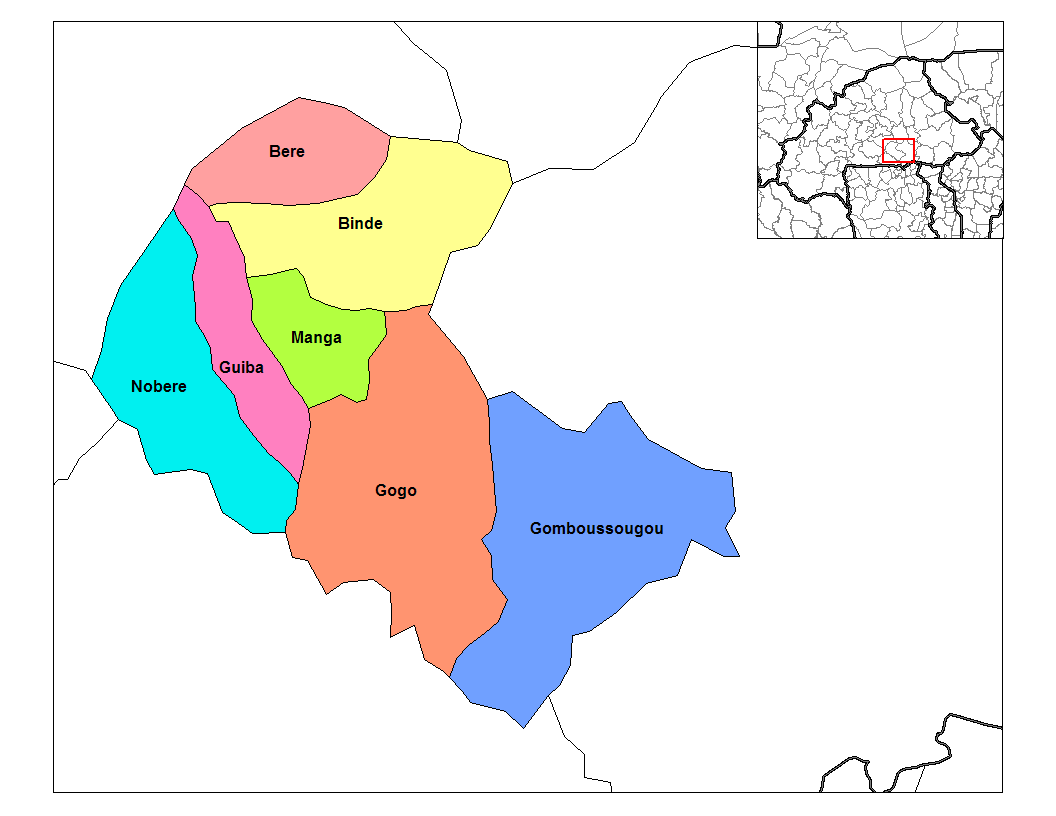
- Bere Department location in the province
- Country: Burkina Faso
- Province: Zoundwéogo Province

Area
  - Total: 107.4 sq mi (278.1 km^{2})

Population (2019 census)
  - Total: 33,489
- Time zone: UTC+0 (GMT 0)

Béré is a department or commune of Zoundwéogo Province in central Burkina Faso.

== Towns and villages ==
The capital of the department is the town of Béré.
