= Guiba Department =

Coordinates: 11°41′N 1°10′W

Guiba
- Department
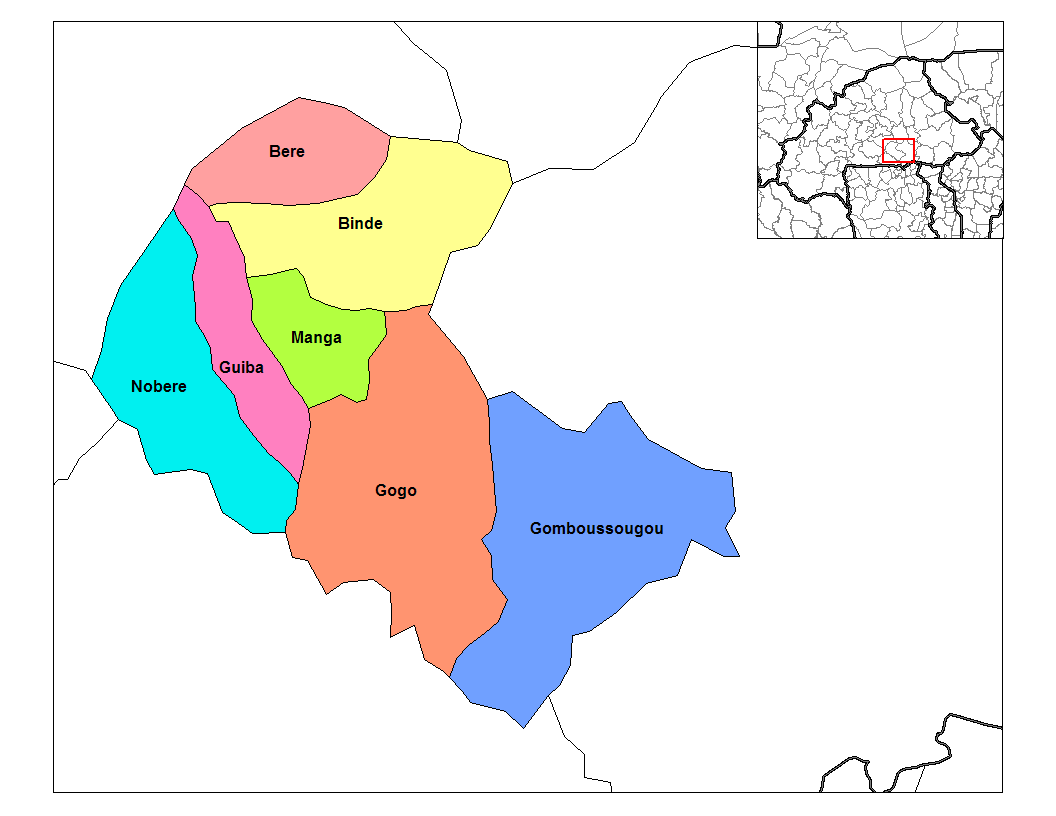
- Guiba Department location in the province
- Country: Burkina Faso
- Province: Zoundwéogo Province

Area
  - Total: 106.6 sq mi (276.2 km^{2})

Population (2019 census)
  - Total: 31,872
- Time zone: UTC+0 (GMT 0)

Guiba is a department or commune of Zoundwéogo Province in central Burkina Faso. It is located directly east of Nobere Department.

== Towns and villages ==
The capital of Guiba Department is the town of Guiba.
