= Manga, Burkina Faso =

- Location within Burkina Faso, West Africa
- Coordinates: 11°40′N 1°04′W
- Country: Burkina Faso
- Region: Centre-Sud Region
- Province: Zoundwéogo Province
- Department: Manga
- Elevation: 283 m (928 ft)

Population (2019 census)
  - Total: 28,615
- Time zone: UTC+0 (GMT)

Manga is a town located in the province of Zoundwéogo in Burkina Faso. It is the capital of Zoundwéogo Province and Centre-Sud Region.
