= Nobéré Department =

Coordinates: 11.5581°N 1.2044°W

Nobere
- Department
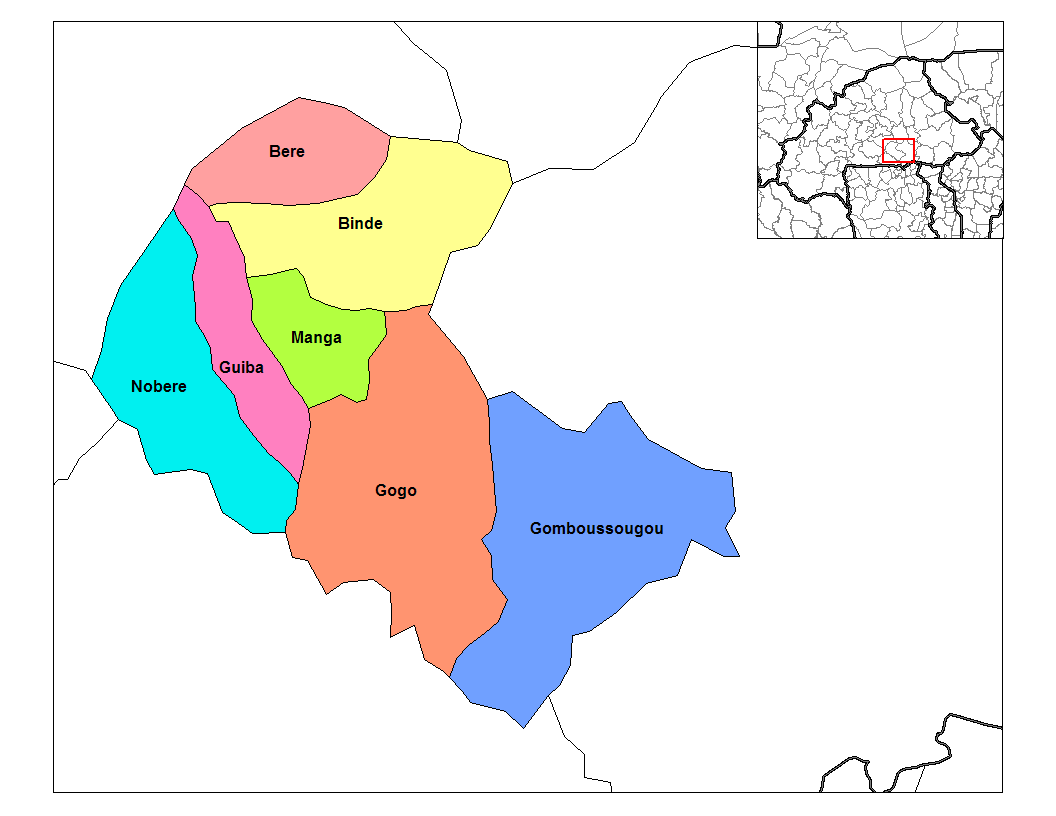
- Nobéré Department location in the province
- Country: Burkina Faso
- Province: Zoundwéogo Province

Area
  - Total: 227.2 sq mi (588.5 km^{2})

Population (2019 census)
  - Total: 39,492
- Time zone: UTC+0 (GMT 0)

Nobéré is a department or commune of Zoundwéogo Province in central Burkina Faso. Nobéré Department is located directly west of Guiba Department.

== Towns and villages ==
The capital of Nobéré Department is the town of Nobéré.
