= Manga Department =

Coordinates: 11.6700°N 1.0670°W

Manga
- Department
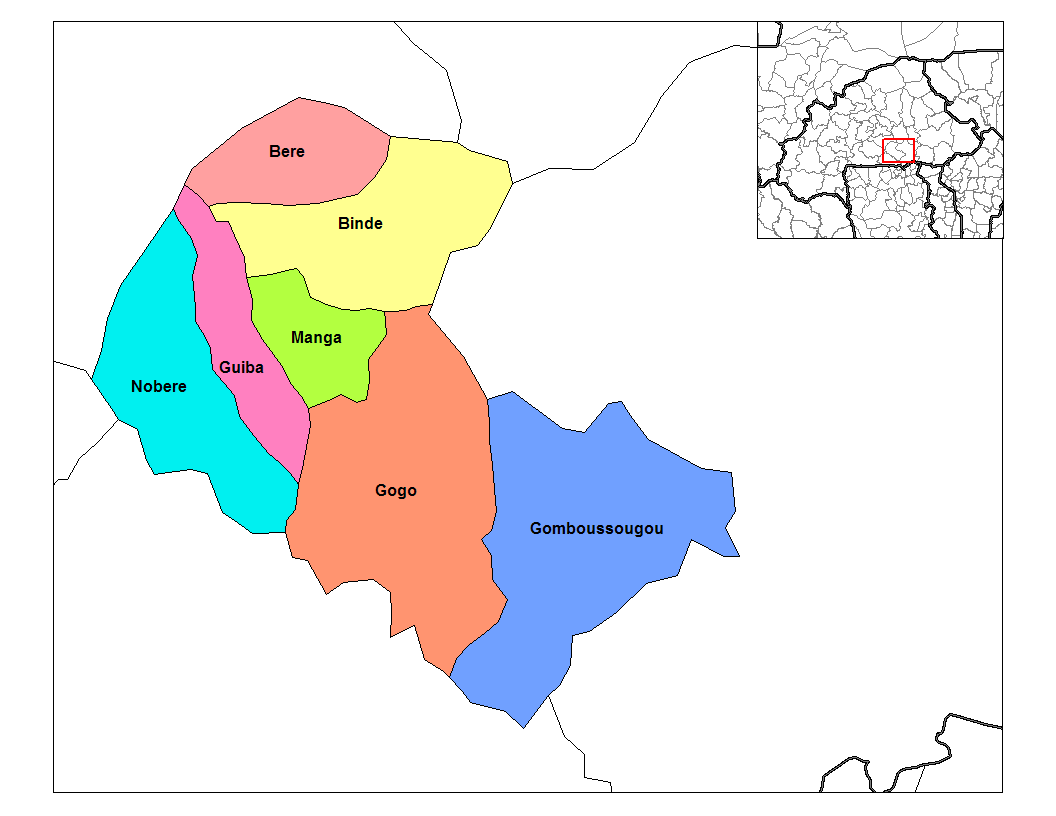
- Manga Department location in the province
- Country: Burkina Faso
- Province: Zoundwéogo Province

Area
  - Department: 95 sq mi (245 km^{2})

Population (2019 census)
  - Department: 44,068
  - Density: 466/sq mi (180/km^{2})
  - Urban: 28,615
- Time zone: UTC+0 (GMT 0)

Manga is a department or commune of Zoundwéogo Province in central Burkina Faso.

== Towns and villages ==
The capital of the department is the town of Manga.
