= Guiba =

Guiba Djiba
- Village
- Country: Burkina Faso
- Region: Centre-Sud
- Province: Zoundwéogo
- Department: Guiba
- Time zone: UTC+0 (GMT)

Guiba or Djiba is a village in Burkina Faso. It is famous for being the traditional place where Mossi crown princes lived before they became Moro Naba (king).
