= Boko language =

Mande language spoken in Benin and Nigeria

Boko
- Bokonya
- Native to: Benin, Nigeria
- Ethnicity: Bissa people
- Native speakers: 150,000 (2012)
- Language family: Niger–Congo: Mande; Eastern; Bisa–Busa; Samo–Busa; Busa languages; Busa–Boko; Boko

Language codes
- ISO 639-3: bqc
- Glottolog: boko1266

Boko, or Boo, is a Mande language of Benin and Nigeria.

== Names ==
Boko is also known as Boo. The Hausa name Busanci is also used for the Busa language, spoken in the same region. Boko is one of the Eastern Mande languages, and the Busa and Bissa people are other Eastern Mande groups. In the region, the Bariba language is also spoken.

== Geographic distribution ==
=== Nigeria ===
In Nigeria, Boko is spoken in Borgu Local Government Area of Niger State, in Bagudo LGA of Kebbi State, and in Kwara state, with the Busa people (Bussawa) also living there.

=== Benin ===
In Benin, Boko is spoken in Alibori and Borgou departments (Segbana and Kalalé Comunes).

== Classification ==
Boko language is one of the Eastern Mande languages. Eastern Mande also includes several other languages spoken across the Volta River and the Borgu region, including Busa, Bissa and Samo, and Bokobaru is a Busa dialect.

Other languages of the region include Bariba, Dendi, Hausa and the official languages French and English.

== Orthography ==
Boko language has 25 letters (Aa, Bb, Dd, Ee, Ɛɛ, Ff, Gg, Gb gb, Ii, Kk, Kp kp, Ll, Mm, Nn, Oo, Ɔɔ, Pp, Rr, Ss, Tt, Uu, Vv, Ww, Yy, Zz).

Nasalised vowels are marked with a Tilde.

High tones are marked with an acute accent and low tones are marked with a grave accent.
