= Gogo Department =

Coordinates: 11°33′39″N 0°57′42″W

Gogo
- Department
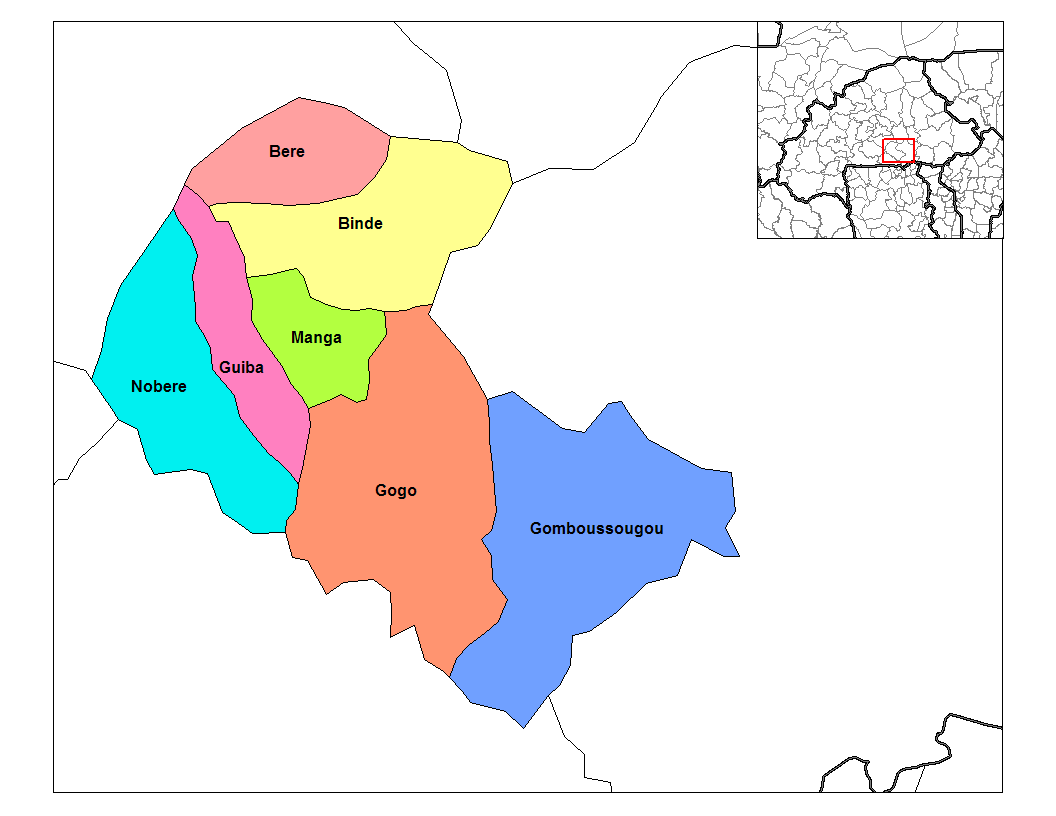
- Gogo Department location in the province
- Country: Burkina Faso
- Province: Zoundwéogo Province

Area
  - Total: 383.4 sq mi (993.0 km^{2})

Population (2019 census)
  - Total: 49,619
- Time zone: UTC+0 (GMT 0)

Gogo is a department or commune of Zoundwéogo Province in central Burkina Faso.

== Towns and villages ==
The capital of Gogo Department is the town of Gogo.
