= Nobéré =

Town in Burkina Faso

Coordinates: 11°33′N 1°12′W

- Village
- Location within Burkina Faso
- Country: Burkina Faso
- Region: Centre-Sud
- Province: Zoundwéogo
- Department: Nobéré

Population (2019)
  - Total: 4,923
- Time zone: UTC+0 (GMT)

Nobéré is a village in Burkina Faso. It the largest town in the Nobéré Department in Zoundwéogo Province. In 2019, it had a population of 4923 people.
