= Gogo, Zoundwéogo =

Town in Burkina Faso

Gogo
- Village
- Location within Burkina Faso
- Coordinates: 11.4787°N 0.9613°W
- Country: Burkina Faso
- Region: Centre-Sud
- Province: Zoundwéogo
- Department: Gogo

Population (2019)
  - Total: 5,605
- Time zone: UTC+0 (GMT)

Gogo is a village in Burkina Faso. It located in the Gogo Department in Zoundwéogo Province. In 2019, it had a population of 5605 people.
