= Beres =

The surnames Beres, Béres, Berès, and Bereś may refer to:

- András Béres (1924–1993), Hungarian football manager and player
- Bence Béres (born 1992), Hungarian Olympic skater
- Jerzy Bereś (1930–2012), Polish sculptor and performance artist
- Lisa Beres, American writer
- Louis René Beres (born 1945), professor of political science at Purdue University and newspaper columnist
- Mike Beres (born 1973), Canadian badminton player
- Pervenche Berès (born 1957), French politician and Member of the European Parliament
- Pierre Berès (1913–2008), French bookseller and antiquarian book collector
- Stanisław Bereś (born 1950), Polish poet, literary critic and literary historian
- Tamás Ferenc Béres (born 1982), Hungarian footballer
- Zoltán Béres (born 1970), Hungarian boxer

== See also ==
- Beris, a genus of flies
- Beris, Sistan and Baluchestan, Iran, a city
- Beris, Ardabil, Iran, a village
- Blake Berris (born 1984), American actor
