= Soninke people =

West African ethnic group

Soninke
Sarakollé / Aswanik
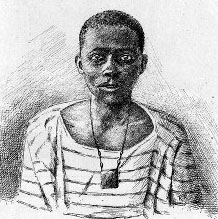
- A Portrait of a Soninke man (1890)

Total population
- Over 2.8 million

Regions with significant populations
- Mali: 2,125,000 (9.8%)
- Senegal: 225,155 (1.4%)
- Mauritania: 238,000
- Gambia: 142,606 (8.2%)
- Burkina Faso: 25,000
- France: 20,000

Languages
- Soninke, French

Religion
- Sunni Islam (Maliki school)

Related ethnic groups
- Jakhanke people, Yalunka people, Maraka People, Sosso people, Wangara people

The Soninke (Sarakolleh) people are a West African Mande-speaking ethnic group found in Mali, southern Mauritania, eastern Senegal, The Gambia, and Guinea (especially Fouta Djallon). They speak the Soninke language, also called the Serakhulle or Azer language, which is one of the Mande languages. Soninke people were the founders of the ancient empire of Ghana or Wagadou c. 200–1240 CE, Subgroups of Soninke include the Jakhanke, Maraka, Sosso and Wangara. When the Ghana empire was destroyed, the resulting diaspora brought Soninkes to Mali, Mauritania, Senegal, Gambia, Burkina Faso, Côte d'Ivoire, Guinée-Conakry, modern-day Republic of Ghana, Kano in Nigeria, and Guinea-Bissau where some of this trading diaspora was called Wangara. This led to the saying in Senegal "when Americans landed on the moon, a Soninke was already there", with other versions of the saying across West Africa.

Predominantly Muslims, the Soninke were one of the early ethnic groups from West Africa to convert to Islam in about the 10th century. The contemporary population of Soninke people is estimated to be over 2 million. The cultural practices of Soninke people are similar to the Mandé peoples, and those of the Imraguen of Mauritania. They include traditional Islamic rites of marriage, circumcision, and have social stratification.

== Ethnonym ==
The Soninke people are also referred to as Aswanik, Dafing, Dafi, Dyakanke, Gadyaga, Maraka, Maraxa, Marka, Marka Soninké, Sarakolleh, Saracole, Zarakole, Zagha, Sarakolé, Sarakollé, Sarakule, Sarawule, Saraxole, Seraculeh, Serahuli, Serakhulle, Silabe, Soniake, Soninkés, Sonninké, Toubakai, Wakore, Wangara.

They refer to themselves by the word "Soninké", which is actually the singular of the word "Soninko", but are also called "Sarakholés" by the Wolofs, "Marakas" by the Bambaras, "Wangara" by the Mandinka, "Wangarawa" by the Hausa, "Wakoré" by the Songhais, or even "Toubakai". "Marka" is the name by which they are known in Mali in the region of Kayes, Koulikoro, Sikasso, Ségou, Mopti and in Burkina Faso in that of Dafina.

The term "Serakhulle," although often claimed to be a Wolof word, was used for the Soninke at least as far back as the 16th century and is used by peoples as far apart as The Gambia and Hausaland. The Jahankas, a subgroup, refer to themselves as of Serakhulle extraction. Historically, the term "Soninke" carries negative connotations in the Futa Djallon and Senegambia, hence the more common use of the term "Serakhulle."

== History ==
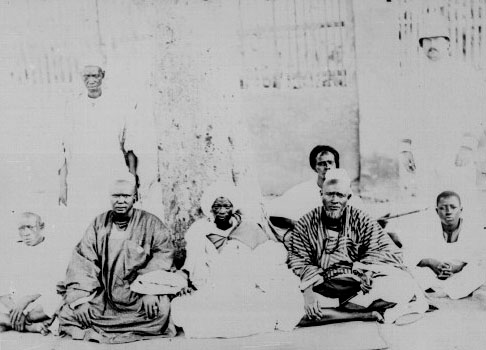
Diobé, ruler of Soninke colonial era town of Bakel, with his advisors (1887–1888)

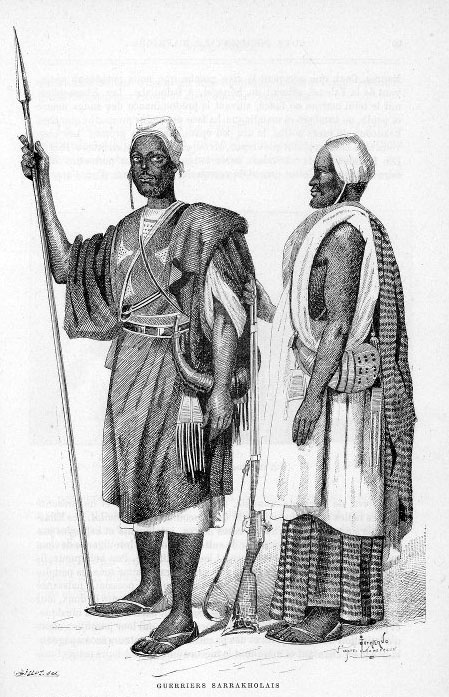
Soninke warriors

Archaeological evidence suggests that the regions where Soninke people are found were inhabited in ancient times. These stone settlements were built on the rocky promontories of Tichit-Walata and the Tagant cliffs of Southern Mauritania. Though there are no surviving records to suggest which ethnic group these people were, the settlers of this region by between 2500 BCE and 600 BCE were likely related to the Soninke and greater Mande people. A significant agro-pastoral society had developed in this prehistoric era.

According to Soninke oral tradition, the ancestor of the Soninke was Dinga, sometimes said to have come from the Middle East (though such a story is unlikely, as the "Middle Eastern" tag came about subsequent to the Mande converting to Islam), His sons included Dyabe Sisse, the founder of the Wagadu kingdom with its capital at Kumbi. Another Soninke tradition indicates that they migrated from Aswan, Egypt. However theories of foreign origin are almost entirely doubted/disregarded by scholars and are believed to result from later Eurasiatic cultural influences (Namely Arab and French). Archaeological evidence supports an evolution of the Ghana Empire and other Mande states from roots in preceding local ancestral Soninke cultures such as that of Dhar Tichitt, rather than from North Africa or the Middle East.

The early written records about Soninke come from early Islamic historians. The Soninke, according to these records, were the founders of the ancient Ghana Empire (not to be confused with modern Ghana), also called the Wagadu Empire. The empire has its roots roughly between the (13 century BC to the 1st century BC) truly materializing within the (1st and 3rd) centuries CE but was destroyed by about the 12th century, after the Muslim invasions of this region started in the 10th century.

== Demographics and distribution ==
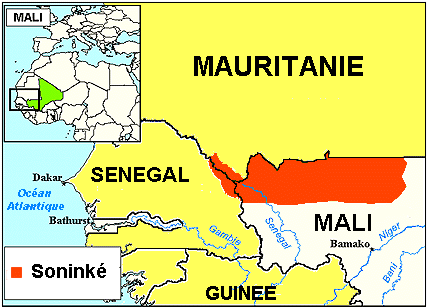
Map of the Soninke population centers in Mali

In contemporary time, the total population of Soninke people is above 2 million. Soninke people are found throughout West Africa and in France, given their migration when Senegal and Mali were a part of the French colonial empire.

Most of the Soninke people are found in the valley of the upper Senegal River and along the Mali–Senegal–Mauritania border between Nara and Nioro du Sahel. Migrations under French colonial rule led many Soninke to build communities in Dakar, other cities in Africa and in France. Soninke community were the early settlers in France, their community is found in Paris and in southern French cities, and their language is the primary dialect spoken among many Muslim communities of France. There are also many Soninke living in cities throughout Central Africa, a population that includes new migrants as well as descendants of migration dating back to the 1800s, such as the laptots who represented French mercantile and colonial interests in the region.

Trade networks led by the Wangara mercantile confederations, spread Soninke people and culture throughout most of Mali and Senegal, southern Mauritania, northern Burkina Faso, as well as parts of the Gambia, and Guinea-Bissau. The Maraka-Soninke merchant communities and plantations (centered just north of the city of Segou, Mali) were an economic mainspring under the Bambara Empire, and built trade routes in the West Africa region.

== Religion ==
The Soninke people were a coastal trade link between the Berber people of the Maghreb region and the other Empires in West Africa. In their early history, they helped exchange salt from the north and western coast for gold found inland. This trade brought Muslim traders to them, particularly Arab traders interested in gold, after Islam arrived in North Africa. The earliest passing mention of Soninke people's Ghana Empire is found in the works of the 8th century Arab geographer Muḥammad ibn Ibrāhīm al-Fazārī and a more complete record is found in works of another 11th century Arab geographer Al-Bakri.

The rulers and Soninke people of the Ghana Empire converted to Islam in the 11th century, and they have been Muslim ever since. Some Islamic sources suggest that the conversion was triggered after the 1076 Almoravid conquest of the Ghana Empire. The Soninke people, like other Mande peoples, typically adhere to the Maliki school of Sunni Islam.

== Society and culture ==
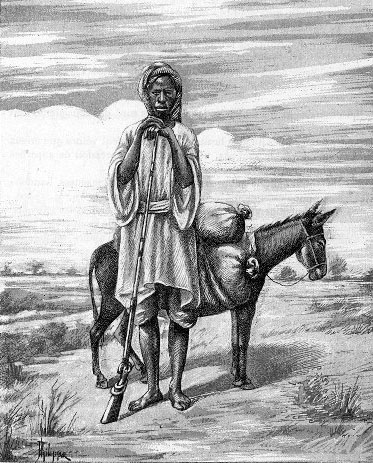
A Soninke man c. 1890, sketched by a French officer

The Soninke society and its culture has historically many cultural practices with its neighboring ethnic groups, particularly the Mande peoples. This includes the religion of Islam, occupations, foods, the rites of passage, family structure, weddings and social stratification.

=== Social stratification ===
Soninke society, like other groups in Mande, is shaped by various forms of social stratification.

The Soninke strata have included a free category called Horro or Horon, a caste system category called Namaxala or Nyaxamalo, and slaves called Komo. In the Jaara subgroup of the Soninke people, the nobility called Tunkanlenmu was another strata. Soninke society became highly stratified after the 13th century.

The slaves were the largest stratum, one at the bottom among the Soninke like other West African ethnic groups, and constituted up to half of the population. The slaves among the Soninke people were hierarchically arranged into three strata. The village slaves were a privileged servile group who lived apart from the village and took orders from the village chief. The domestic slaves lived with a family and could not be sold. The lowest level among slaves were the trade slaves who could be bought and sold. With time, each of these strata became endogamous, states Daniel Littlefield, a professor of history.

Above the slaves were the castes of Soninke, which too were hereditary, endogamous, and had an embedded hierarchical status. They included, for example, the garanke (leather workers) below the fune (bard), the fune below the gesere or jeli (griots, singers), and the jeli below the tage or numu (smiths, pottery workers).

The castes and serf system can be linked to the Mandé 'Nyamakalaw' (literally 'caste'). archaeological evidence shows that Arabs and Berbers would later participate in an already established and integrated trade and transport network with West Africa (trading in gold, salt, and some slaves to a lesser extent), building upon the pre-existing trade routes trading had extended into Ghana and the western Atlantic coast by the 11th century trading systems became increasingly sophisticated in 13th and 14th century Mali Empire and 16th century Songhai Empire.

As the practice of slavery grew, so did the caste system. Tamari suggests that a corollary of the rising slavery system was the development and growth of the caste system among numerous ethnic groups of Africa by about the 13th century. McIntosh concurs with Tamari, but states that the emergence of caste systems likely occurred much earlier in West African societies such as Soninke, Mande, Malinke, Wolof, Serer, and others. She places the development and spread of castes in these societies to about the 10th century, because the slave capture, slave trade and slave holding by elite families was an established institution in West Africa by then, and slavery created a template for servile relationships and social stratification of human beings.

The linguistic evidence suggests that stratification structure relating to caste system and slavery likely were shared between the Manding and Soninke people, and possibly some others such as the Dogon people of West Africa. However, the linguistic differences between the caste and slave systems of the Soninke and Manding on one hand and northern ethnic groups of Africa such as the Tuareg people and Moors on the other, suggests that these evolved separately.

=== Marriage ===
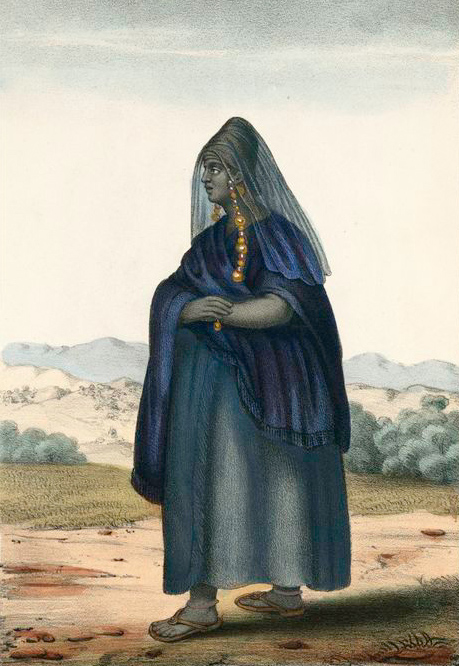
A Soninke woman, an 1853 sketch by David Boilat

Marriage in Soninke society follows Islamic practices. Cousin marriages are common and preferred in Soninke culture, just as with the Fula people. Parents consent to marriage. A traditional proverb states, "Cousins are made for each other." The practice among Soninke merchants, states Saskia Brand, a professor of psychology and educational sciences, may be related to the cultural belief that cousin marriages "helps to keep the money in the family".

If both families agree, the couple is engaged (i na tamma laga) in a mosque. Each month after the engagement, the man pays the woman's family a bridewealth dower (nakhafa) for their food and other spending. The marriage, called futtu, is complete with a marriage contract that mentions the dower, and is accompanied with a wedding event called karikompe.

The newly married couple has advisors. The man's advisor is called the khoussoumanta-yougo and the woman's is called khoussoumanta-yakhare. After one week of celebration, the women meet to show the gifts that the couple received from their parents mostly from the woman's mother.

Marriage across social strata and caste lines has been taboo, states Saskia Brand. But, in polygynous noble families, a noble could take a wife from the slave strata.

=== Circumcision ===
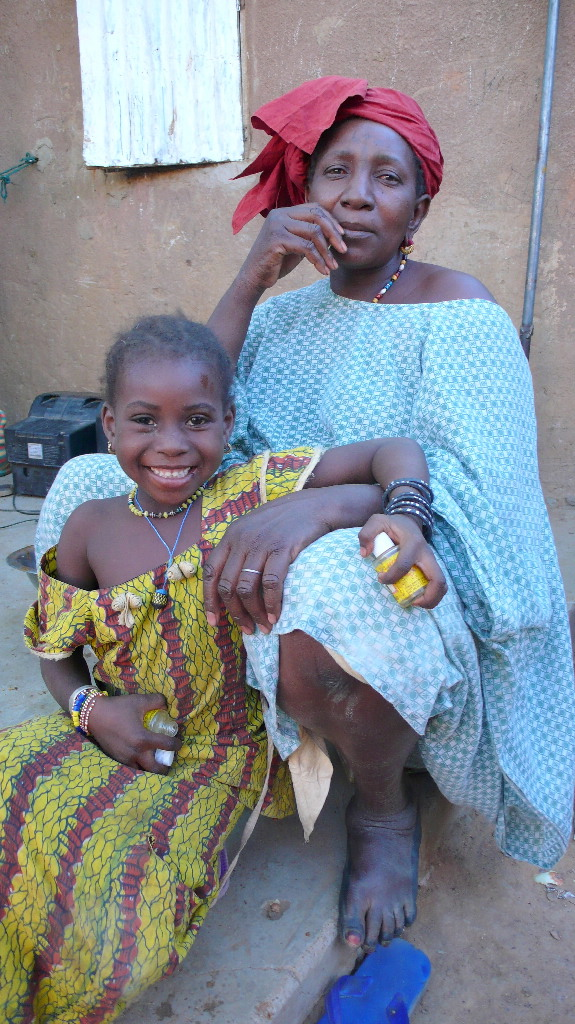
A Soninke woman and her daughter in Sélibaby, Mauritania

The Soninke practise circumcision and call it birou. Every afternoon, the boys who were circumcised the previous year organize tam-tams for the new boys in order to prepare them psychologically. Throughout the circumcision ceremony, the boys to be circumcised sit around the "tambour" called "daïné". The other teenagers of the village, young girls, women, men, and slaves form a circle around the boys. During this time the boys are surrounded with beautiful scarves called disa sing. The author Mamadou Soumare wrote "Above its traditional surgery, the ritual of circumcision makes in evidence, the physical endurance, the pain, the courage, in one word the personality of the child."

==== Female genital mutilation ====
The Soninke people have long carried out female genital mutilation (FGM), also called female circumcision. The prevalence rate of FGM is higher among the Soninke than among neighbouring ethnic groups such as Wolof people and others. The practice is culturally done as a ritual of social acceptance, and sometimes assumed to be required for religious reasons. In Mauritania and Senegal, FGM of a child is illegal in contemporary law but continues because it is culturally sanctioned for young girls as young as one year old. According to the 2009 Report on Human Rights Practices by the US State Department, FGM practice among Soninke has included the most dangerous Type III mutilations.

=== Foods ===
Breakfast foods include fonde, porridge made of millet, sugar, milk, and salt, and sombi, porridge made of rice, millet or corn. For lunch demba tere and takhaya are very common, both containing rice and peanuts, frequent Soninke ingredients. Dere, a stew, is a mixture of millet and beans.

== Economy ==
The Soninke traditionally engage in both trade and agriculture. During the rainy season, men and women both cultivate. However, women usually stay at home to cook and take care of their children. They also do other work, such as dyeing cotton material.

Many early West African immigrants in France came from this ethnic group. The Soninke are an influential ethnic group in the Gambia, Senegal, and Mali.

=== Soninke patronyms ===
1. Bathily
2. Camara
3. Cissé
4. Diakité
5. Diawara
6. Doucouré
7. Dramé
8. Niakhaté
9. Sylla
10. Touré

== Notable Soninke people ==
- Doussou Bagayoko, Malian musician
- Mamadou Bagayoko, Malian footballer
- Siaka Bagayoko, Malian footballer
- Abdoulaye Bathily, Senegalese historian and politician
- Djegui Bathily, Senegalese Judoka
- Lassana Bathily, Malian opportunist
- Germain Berthé, Malian footballer
- Ousmane Berthé, Malian footballer
- Hassoun Camara, French footballer
- Khassa Camara, Mauritanian footballer
- Soninke Camara, Malian musician
- Zoumana Camara, French footballer
- Kaya Magan Cissé
- Papiss Cissé, Senegalese footballer
- Lassana Hawa Cissokho, Malian musician
- Moussa Diagana, Mauritanian writer
- Ismaël Diakité, Mauritanian footballer
- Souleymane Diamouténé, Malian footballer
- Fousseni Diawara, Malian footballer
- Diaby Doua, Malian musician
- Boubacari Doucouré, French footballer
- Cheick Doucouré, Malian footballer
- Kamory Doumbia, Malian footballer
- Moussa Doumbia, Malian footballer
- Boukary Dramé, Senegalese footballer
- Chéché Dramé, Malian musician
- Mamadou Lamine Dramé, was a 19th-century marabout who fought against French colonization
- Demba Ganda Fadiga, Malian musician
- Diadia Fadiga, Malian musician
- Ganda Fadiga, Malian griot
- Khalilou Fadiga, Senegalese footballer
- Babou Fofana, Malian footballer
- Gueïda Fofana, French footballer
- Guessouma Fofana, Mauritanian footballer
- Lamine Gassama, Senegalese footballer
- Mamoudou Gassama, undocumented migrant from Mali
- Omaré Gassama, Mauritanian footballer
- Omar Gassama, Gambian politician
- Sadio Gassama, Malian politician
- Bingourou Kamara, Senegalese footballer
- Frédéric Kanouté, Malian footballer
- Sadio Kanouté, Malian footballer
- N'Golo Kanté, French footballer
- Ibrahima Kébé, Senegalese visual artist
- Babacar Khouma, Senegalese footballer
- Sékou Koïta, Malian footballer
- Mademba Konté, Malian musician
- Yimbi Kumma, Malian rapper
- Linky LK, Malian rapper
- Mamadou Demba Magassa, Malian musician
- Mohamed Magassouba, Malian football coach
- Moussa Marega, Malian footballer
- Moussa Niakhaté, Senegalese footballer
- Falaye Sacko, Malian footballer
- Lamine Sakho, Senegalese footballer
- Harouna Samaké, Malian Kamale N'goni player
- Issaka Samaké, Malian footballer
- Soumaila Samaké, Malian basketball player
- Yéah Samaké, Malian entrepreneur and politician
- Mamadou Samassa, Malian footballer
- Diadie Samassékou, Malian footballer
- Oumou Sangaré, Malian musician
- Younousse Sankharé, Senegalese footballer
- Landing Savané, Senegalese politician
- Sitapha Savané, Senegalese basketball player
- Djibril Sidibé, Malian footballer
- Gabourey Sidibe, American actress
- Mahamadou Sidibé, Malian footballer
- Kaïdama Sidibé, former Prime Minister of Mali
- Muhammed B. Sissoho, Gambian Soninke TV & Radio talk show host
- Sidney Sokhona, Mauritanian filmmaker
- Bintou Soumbounou, Malian musician
- Maimouna Soumbounou, Malian musician
- Fanta Souroukou, Malian musician
- Youssouf Sabaly, Senegalese footballer
- Myriam Soumaré, French track and field athlete
- Yacouba Sylla, Malian footballer
- Abubacarr Tambadou, former Minister of Justice of the Gambia
- Adama Tamboura, Malian footballer
- Aïce Tamoura, Malian musician
- Demba Tandia, Malian musician
- Mamadou Tandja, former President of Niger from 1999 to 2010
- Sidy Bonco Tangoudia, Malian musician
- Djelimady Tounkara, Malian musician
- Maakan Tounkara, French handball player
- Mamadou Tounkara, Spanish footballer
- Bassala Touré, Malian footballer
- Halima Kissima Touré, Malian musician
- Balemé Kandji Traoré, Malian musician
- Molla Wagué, Malian footballer
- Moussa Wagué, Senegalese footballer
- Moussa Sissako
- Moustapha Soumaré, Malian diplomat and UN Special Representative

== See also ==
- Soninke language

== Bibliography ==
- (in English) François Manchuelle, Origins of Black African Emigration to France : the Labor Migrations of the Soninke, 1948-1987, Santa Barbara, University of California, 1987 (Thèse)
- (in French) M. T. Abéla de la Rivière, Les Sarakolé et leur émigration vers la France, Paris, Université de Paris V, 1977 (Thèse de 3 cycle)
- (in French) Amadou Diallo, L'éducation en milieu sooninké dans le cercle de Bakel : 1850-1914, Dakar, Université Cheikh Anta Diop, 1994, 36 p. (Mémoire de DEA)
- (in French) Alain Gallay, « La poterie en pays Sarakolé (Mali, Afrique Occidentale) », Journal de la Société des Africanistes, Paris, CNRS, 1970, tome XL, n° 1, p. 7-84
- (in French) Joseph Kerharo, « La pharmacopée sénégalaise : note sur quelques traitements médicaux pratiqués par les Sarakolé du Cercle de Bakel », Bulletin et mémoires de la Faculté mixte de médecine et de pharmacie de Dakar, t. XII, 1964, p. 226-229
- (in French) Nianguiry Kanté, Contribution à la connaissance de la migration "soninké" en France, Paris, Université de Paris VIII, 1986, 726 p. (Thèse de 3 cycle)
- (in French) Michael Samuel, Les Migrations Soninke vers la France, Paris, Université de Paris. (Thèse de 3 cycle)
- (in French) Badoua Siguine, La tradition épique des forgerons soninké, Dakar, Université de Dakar, 198?, (Mémoire de Maîtrise)
- (in French) Badoua Siguine, Le surnaturel dans les contes soninké, Dakar, Université de Dakar, 1983, 215 p. (Mémoire de Maîtrise)
- (in French) Mahamet Timera, Les Soninké en France : d'un histoire à l'autre, Karthala, 1996, 244 p. ISBN 2-86537-701-6
- (in French) Louis Léon César Faidherbe, Vocabulaire d'environ 1,500 mots français avec leurs correspondents en ouolof de Saint-Louis, en poular (toucouleur) du Fouta, en soninké (sarakhollé) de Bakel, 1864, Saint-Louis, Imprimerie du Gouvernement, 1864, 70 p.
- (in French) Louis Léon César Faidherbe, Langues sénégalaises : wolof, arabe-hassania, soninké, sérère, notions grammaticales, vocabulaires et phrases, E. Leroux, 1887, 267 p.
- (in French) Christian Girier, Parlons soninké, l'Harmattan, Paris, 1996, ISBN 2-7384-3769-9
- (in French) Rhonda L. Hartell, Alphabets de langues africaines, Unesco et Summer Institute of Linguistics, Dakar, 1993;
- (in French) Direction de la promotion des langues nationales du Sénégal, Livret d'auto-formation en Soninké, éditions Kalaama-Edicef, 2001.

commune of Diawara, Sénégal]

- (in French) Soobe - Association culturelle de Soninké en Egypte
- (in French) Diaguily - Portail de Diaguily, ville soninké du sud de la Mauritanie
- (in English) Ethnologue - Soninké language at Ethnologue
- (in French) Soninkara.com - Portail de la communauté soninké
- (in French) Soninkara.org - Société et Culture Soninké - Soninké News
- (in English) Asawan.org - Soninke literature - free online library/bookstore
