= Gomboussougou Department =

Coordinates: 11.4261°N 0.7728°W

Gomboussougou
- Department
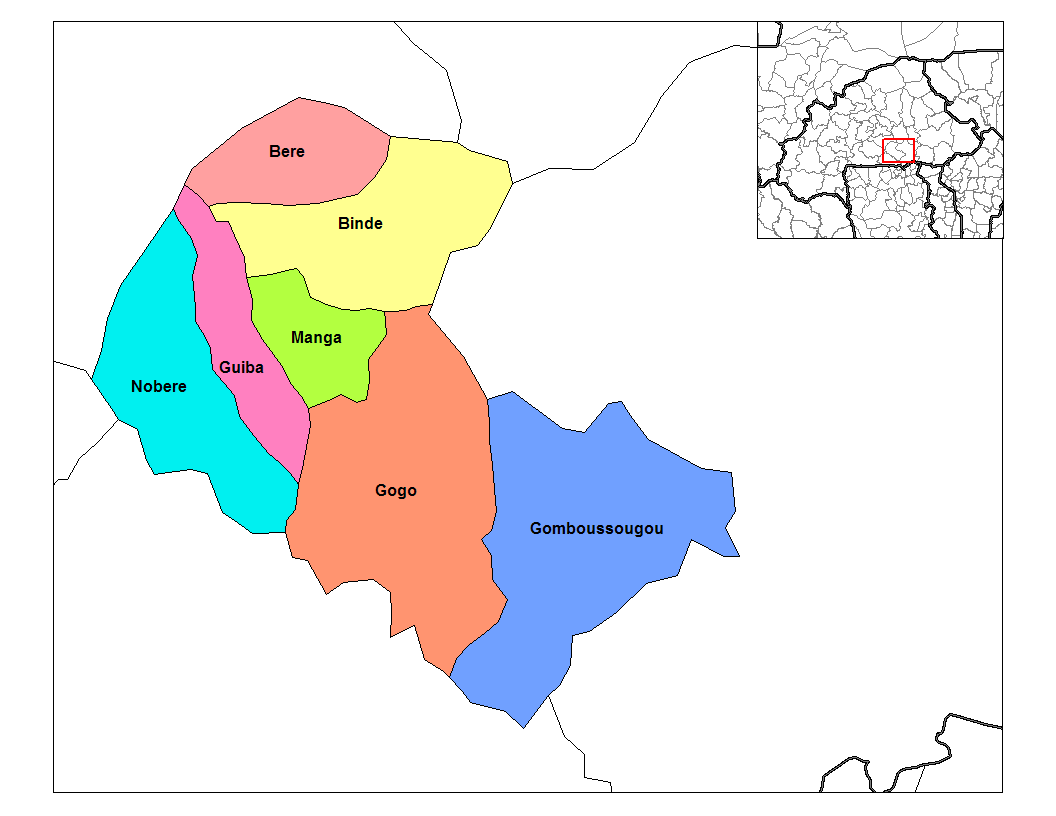
- Gomboussougou Department location in the province
- Country: Burkina Faso
- Province: Zoundwéogo Province

Area
  - Total: 301.8 sq mi (781.6 km^{2})

Population (2019 census)
  - Total: 70,710
  - Density: 234.3/sq mi (90.47/km^{2})
- Time zone: UTC+0 (GMT 0)

Gomboussougou is a department or commune of Zoundwéogo Province in central Burkina Faso.

== Towns and villages ==
The capital of the department is the town of Gomboussougou.
