= Zoundwéogo Province =

Coordinates: 11°40′N 1°04′W

Zoundwéogo
- Province
- Location in Burkina Faso

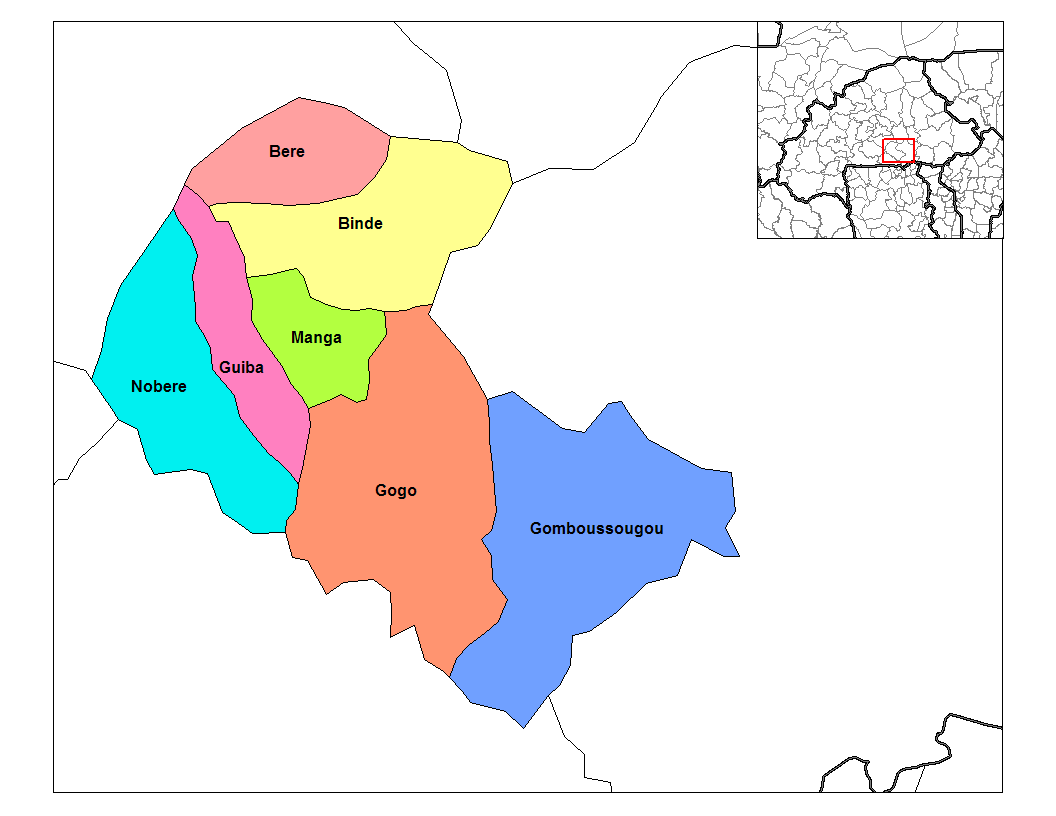
- Provincial map of its departments
- Country: Burkina Faso
- Region: Centre-Sud Region
- Capital: Manga

Area
  - Province: 3,601 km^{2} (1,390 sq mi)

Population (2019 census)
  - Province: 311,940
  - Density: 86.63/km^{2} (224.4/sq mi)
  - Urban: 28,615
- Time zone: UTC+0 (GMT 0)

Zoundwéogo is one of the 45 provinces of Burkina Faso, located in its Centre-Sud Region. In 2019 the population of Zoundwéogo was 311,940. Its capital is Manga.

== Education ==
In 2011 the province had 210 primary schools and 18 secondary schools.

== Healthcare ==
In 2011 the province had 33 health and social promotion centers (Centres de santé et de promotion sociale), 3 doctors and 77 nurses.

== Departments ==
The Departments of Zoundwéogo
Commune	Capital	Population Census 2006)
Bere Department	Bere	28,627
Binde Department	Binde	36,518
Gogo Department	Gogo	38,175
Gomboussougou Department	Gomboussougou	46,401
Guiba Department	Guiba	30,146
Manga Department	Manga	32,033
Nobéré Department	Nobéré	32,814

== See also ==
- Regions of Burkina Faso
- Provinces of Burkina Faso
- Departments of Burkina Faso
