= Juris Binde =

Latvian entrepreneur

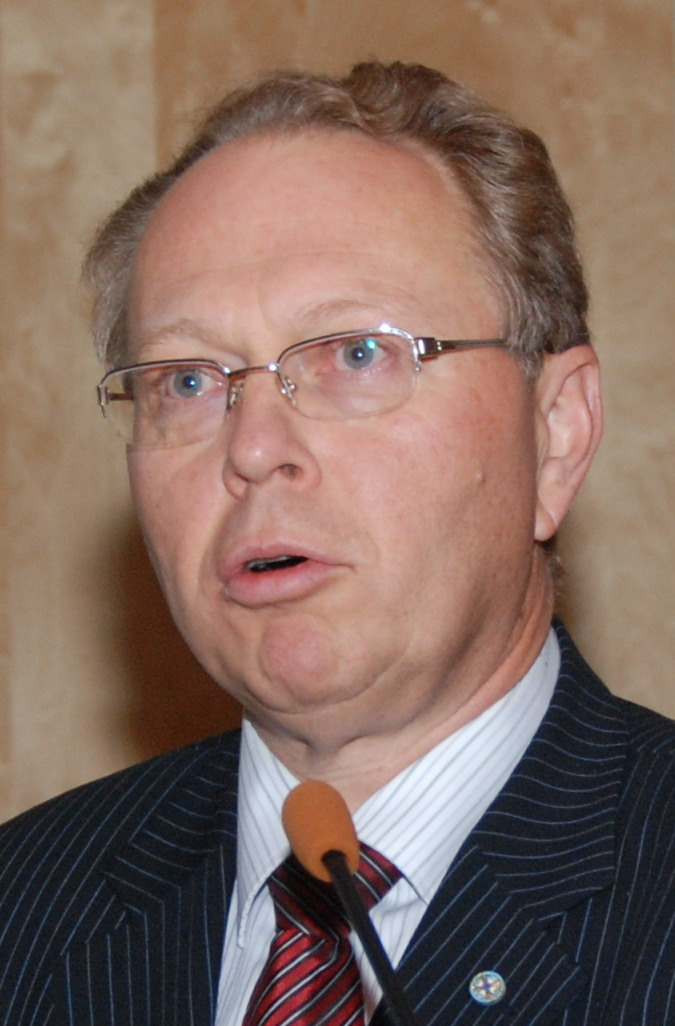
- Juris Binde in 2009
- Born: May 28, 1955 (age 69); Rīga, Latvia

Juris Binde (born 28 May 1955, in Rīga) is a Latvian businessman, scientist, engineer, constructor, holder of a doctorate in economics, president and board chairman at SIA Latvijas Mobilais Telefons (LMT), and a professor at the Vidzeme University College. He has made a major investment in the development of telecommunications in Latvia, strengthening LMT as a leader in innovations and business practices.

== Experience ==
From 1978 until 1984, Binde was an engineer and constructor, chief deputy conductor and then main project conductor at the State Electronics Factory (VEF), working on household radio sets. From 1984 until 1987, he was the deputy director of the Scientific and Technical Information and International Co-operation Department of the VEF Scientific Research Institute (ZPI), as well as the chairman of a systems analysis group. Until 1998, he was the chief technologist for the ZPI. In 1992, Binde became the first president of LMT, taking on the post of board chairman in 2004. In parallel, he has been a professor at the Vidzeme University College since 2001.

== Education ==
Juris Binde graduated from the 2nd Rīga High School in 1973, after which he entered the Faculty of Radio Equipment and Communications at the Rīga Polytechnic Institute, earning a diploma as a radio engineer, constructor and technologist. He pursued further studies in Germany in 1990, at the IFL Swedish Institute of Management in 1995, and the University of Columbia in 2000. From 2005 until 2007, Binde pursued a doctorate at the Faculty of Economics and Management at the University of Latvia, earning his doctorate in business management. In parallel, Binde also completed a programme at the University of Latvia on the fundamentals of the pedagogic education of university faculty members and university didactics (2006).

== Scientific work ==
Binde's areas of expertise include management science and business management, with keywords such as competitiveness, project management, emotional intelligence, public services regulations and management process modelling; information technologies, with keywords including mobile data transmission, broadband Internet, content services, data processing and the Internet of things. He has taken part in many international scholarly and practical conferences and is the author of more than 40 scholarly publications and three industrial samples.

Among these is a two-volume monograph about the State Electronic Factory VEF, "Lasting Values," for which Mr Binde served as editor. From 2013 until 2016, he was a researcher for the European Union TEMPUS programme project FKTBUM (Fostering the Knowledge Triangle in Belarus, Ukraine and Moldova).

== Work on councils and commissions ==
- Chairman of the University of Latvia Convent of Advisors (since 2014);
- Member of the Rīga Technical University (RTU Convent of Advisors (since 2014));
- Honorary doctorate recipient from the RTU (2006);
- Vice-president of the Latvian Association of Information and Communications Technologies (since 2014);
- Vice president of the Latvian Confederation of Employers (since 2010);
- Deputy board chairman of the "Latvian Formula 2050" association (since 2018);
- Member of the Latvian Productivity, Effectiveness, Development and Competitiveness Forum (PEAK);
- Chairman of the Strategic Consulting Council of the Vidzeme University College (since 2012);
- Chairman of the state exams commission at the University of Latvia's professional master's degree programme in project management (since 2009), and the master's degree programme in strategic management and leadership (since 2018).

== Hobbies ==
At the age of 14, Juris Binde became interested in model cars and took part in competitions, becoming the Latvian champion in model cars and model ships several times. He took part in several USSR-level competitions in technical areas of sports, as well as the IRSI ice rally championship. Since 2000, Mr Binde has been excited about golf. He has played games on nearly 100 courses in the world and is a collector of golf balls.

== Recognition and awards ==
- Order of Three Stars, 4th Class (2001);
- Order of the Polar Star, 1st Class (2014);
- Certificate of commendation from the Ministry of Transport (2000);
- Certificate of commendation from the Cabinet of Ministers (1998);
- Jānis Linters Prize (1993).
