= Binde, Burkina Faso =

Coordinates: 11°45′N 1°06′W

Binde
- Village
- Location within Burkina Faso, French West Africa
- Country: Burkina Faso
- Region: Centre-Sud
- Province: Zoundwéogo
- Department: Binde

Population (2006)
  - Total: 36,518
- Time zone: UTC+0 (GMT)

Binde is a village in Burkina Faso. It is the capital of Binde Department in Zoundwéogo.
