= Lisa Beres =

American writer

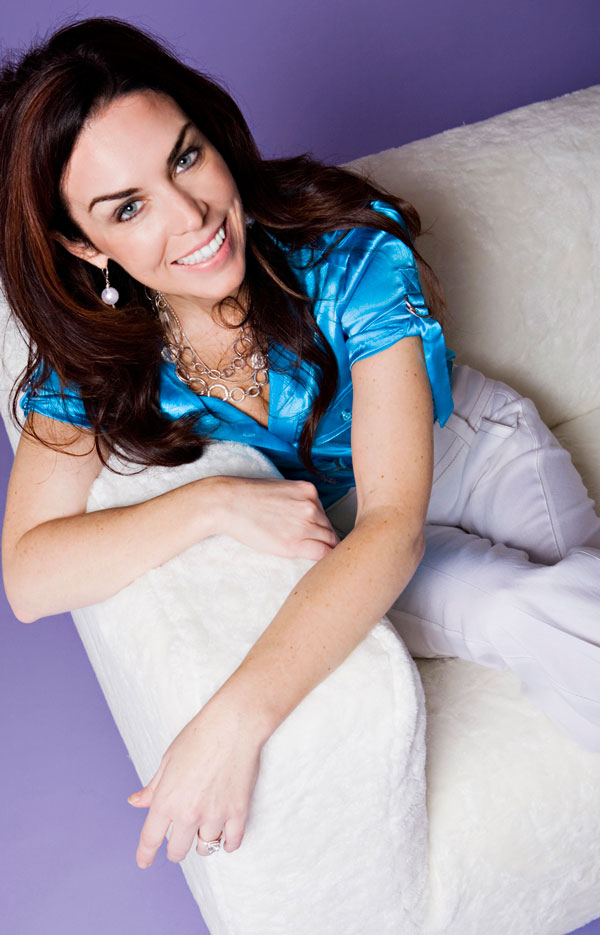
Lisa Beres

Lisa Beres is a Healthy Home Authority, certified green building professional, Building Biologist (BBEC) and children's book author.

Beres wrote My Body My House, a parable of the dangers of introducing hazardous chemicals into one's home. She is also the co-author with Sally Jessy Raphael of the audio CD Your Home Through Green Colored Glasses. She has co-authored several audio CDs including Learn to Create a Healthy Home, an educational tool used for identifying unhealthy products in the home, and The 9 to 5 Greened: 10 Steps to a Healthy Office. She is also the co-author of the book, Just Green It! Simple Swaps to Save the Planet and Your Health (Running Press; April 2010).

Beres and her husband, Ron Beres, are often relied upon as subject matter experts for issues related to green and healthy living. The Bereses are Telly Award winning experts and have provided expert commentary on radio and television shows including NBC's Today Show, Discovery Channel's Greenovate, Fox & Friends, Living Well with Montel Williams, The Doctors, Dr. Oz, the Home Shopping Network, NBC Nightly News, The Suzanne Somers Show, and Chelsea Lately on E! Beres is a national spokesperson for organic, green, non-toxic products and conducts Healthy Home Media Tours across the country.

Beres has served as an advisory board member for Cal State Fullerton University's UEE Green Building Program and on the board of directors for the Institute for Building Biology and Ecology. She and her husband founded Green Nest, a retailer of environmentally safe products which they sold in 2011. They are the founders of RonandLisa.com, where they offer online programs (Change Your Home. Change Your Health in 30 Days) and solutions to teach people how to eliminate toxins from their life with simple steps to improve their health. A frequent contributor to several radio and television news programs, Beres acts as green correspondent for the Sally Jessy Raphael radio show and podcast. Beres lives in Irvine, California. Beres and her husband, Ron Beres, conduct professional speaking engagements across the country educating consumers on how to create healthier homes and greener lives. Recently, they educated southern Californians on "How to Live a Green Life" at Maria Shriver's Women's Conference. On October 21, 2008, they joined A-Listers including Warren Buffett Arnold Schwarzenegger, Jennifer Lopez, and Bono. The entire list of speakers can be viewed at Women's Conference 2008. Their consulting business includes celebrities as well as Fortune 1000 companies.

== Published works ==
- Beres, Lisa (2006). My Body, My House. ISBN 0-97723-920-9.
- Beres & Beres, Lisa & Ron (2006). Learn to Create a Healthy Home!. ISBN 0-9772392-1-7.
- Beres & Beres, Lisa & Ron (2008). The 9 to 5 Greened: 10 Steps to a Healthy Office. ISBN 0-9772392-3-3.
- Beres & Raphael, Lisa & Sally Jessy (2009). Your Home Through Green Colored Glasses. ISBN 0-9772392-4-1.
- Beres & Beres, Lisa & Ron (2010). Just Green It! Simple Swaps to Save the Planet and Your Health. ISBN 0-76243-877-0.
