= Garango =

- City
- Location within Burkina Faso, West Africa
- Coordinates: 11°48′N 0°33′W
- Country: Burkina Faso
- Region: Centre-Est Region
- Province: Boulgou Province
- Department: Garango Department
- Elevation: 238 m (781 ft)

Population (2019)
  - Total: 40,404
- Time zone: UTC+0 (GMT)

Garango is a city located in Boulgou Province of Burkina Faso, founded by a great Bissa warrior called Barso. The main ethnic group is the Bissa.

== International relations ==
=== Twin towns – Sister cities ===
Garango is twinned with:

- Laval, France
- Ladenburg, Germany

Population
Year	Pop.	±%
1985	21,987	—
2006	35,015	+59.3%
2019	40,404	+15.4%
