= Bere, Botswana =

Coordinates: 22°49′16″S 21°52′30″E

Location of Bere

Bere is a village in Ghanzi District of Botswana. It is located in the southern part of the district, and it has a primary school. The population was 778 in 2011 census. Bere is now one of the few places in the Central Kalahari where Persistence hunting is still practised.
