= Bindé Department =

Coordinates: 11.7542°N 1.0944°W

Binde
- Department
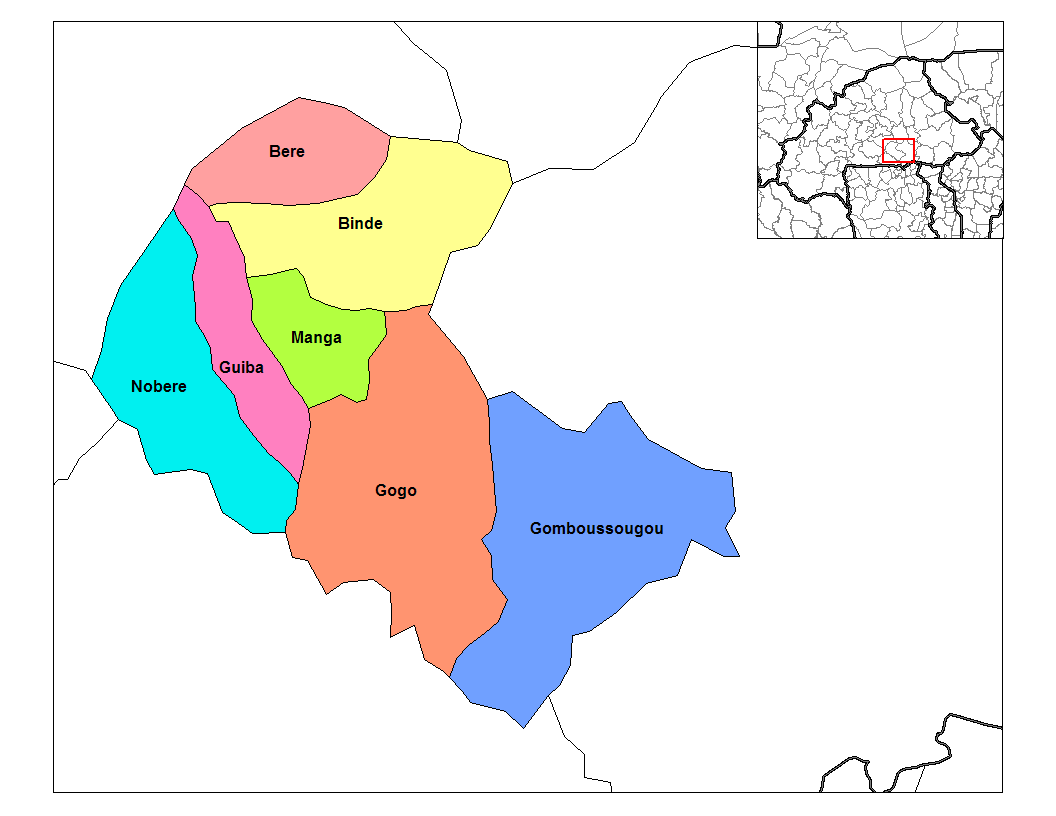
- Binde Department location in the province
- Country: Burkina Faso
- Province: Zoundwéogo Province

Area
  - Total: 194.5 sq mi (503.8 km^{2})

Population (2019 census)
  - Total: 42,789
- Time zone: UTC+0 (GMT 0)

Binde is a department or commune of Zoundwéogo Province in central Burkina Faso.

== Towns and villages ==
Binde is the capital of the department.
