= Bazaga =

Coordinates: 13°48′N 5°06′E

- Commune and village
- Interactive map of Bazaga
- Country: Niger
- Elevation: 830 ft (253 m)

Population (2012)
  - Total: 37.571
- Time zone: UTC+1 (WAT)

Bazaga is a village and rural commune in Niger.
