= Gomboussougou =

- Village
- Location within Burkina Faso, West Africa
- Coordinates: 11.42894°N 0.77577°W
- Country: Burkina Faso
- Region: Centre-Sud
- Province: Zoundwéogo
- Department: Gomboussougou

Population (2019 census)
  - Total: 15,336
- Time zone: UTC+0 (GMT)

Gomboussougou is a rural village in Burkina Faso. It is the capital of Gomboussougou Department in Zoundwéogo.
