= Béré, Burkina Faso =

Béré
- Location in Burkina Faso
- Coordinates: 11°50′N 1°09′W
- Country: Burkina Faso
- Region: Hauts-Bassins Region
- Province: Zoundweogo Province

Béré is a town in Zoundweogo Province, Burkina Faso.
