= Samo language (Burkina) =

Niger-Congo languages spoken in Burkina Faso and Mali

Southern Samo
- San
- Region: Burkina Faso, Mali
- Ethnicity: Samo
- Native speakers: (230,000 cited 1995–1999)
- Language family: Niger–Congo: Mande; Eastern; Bissa–Busa; Samo–Busa; Southern Samo

Language codes
- ISO 639-3: Variously: stj – Matya sym – Maya sbd – Southern
- Glottolog: mand1437
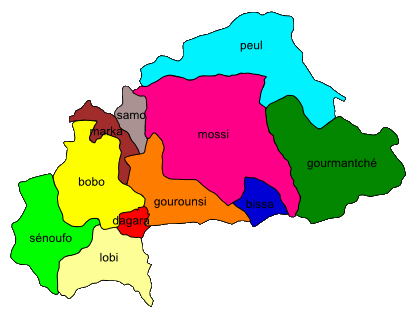
- Majority areas of Samo speakers, in grey, on a map of Burkina Faso

Samo (Sane, San, Sa), also known as Mande Samo, is a dialect cluster of Mande languages spoken in Burkina Faso and Mali.

== Varieties ==
Intelligibility between Samo varieties is low. The following have been coded as separate languages:

- Matya Samo, spoken in Kossi Province, Sourou Province (Nouna and Solenzo areas) and Mali
- Maya Samo, spoken in Sourou Province, Yatenga Province, and Zondoma Province
- Southern/Maka Samo, spoken in Nayala Province (Nouna and Solenzo areas); Sourou Province; Sanguié Province; Passoré Province

== Demographics ==
Samo dialect populations and locations:

Dialect	Region	Population (1985)	Population (2001)
Maka	Southern, surrounding Toma	61,883	84,996
Matya	Northwest, to the west and north of Tougan (excluding Toéni area)	33,675	46,252
Matya	Far Northwest (Toéni region)	9,942	13,655
Maya	Northeast, surrounding Kiembara and Bangassogo	38,393	52,732
all	Total	143,893	197,635

List of Samo villages organised by department and dialect:

Dialect	Province	Department	Villages
Maka	Mouhoun	Tchériba	Bissandérou, Orobié, Youbou
Maka	Nayala	Gassan	Dieré, Djimbara, Gassan, Labara, Laré, Moara, Téri
Maka	Nayala	Gossina	Bosson, Boun, Gossina, Kalabo, Koayo, Le Koun, Madamao, Massako, Naboro, Nianonkoré, Nypon, Sui, Tandou, Tarba, Zebassé
Maka	Nayala	Kougny	Goin, Gougnan, Gouri, Kamba, Kibiri, Kougny, Niaré, Nimina, Sébéré, Tiouma
Maka	Nayala	Toma	Goa, Goussi, Koin, Kola, Konti, Niemé, Nyon, Pankélé, Samba, Sawa, Sien, Siepa, To, Toma, Yayo, Zouma
Maka	Nayala	Yaba	Biba, Bo, Bounou, Kéra, Kisson, La, Loguin, Sapala, Saran, Siena, Tiema, Tosson, Yaba
Matya	Sourou	Di	Benkadi, Poura
Matya	Sourou	Kassoum	Bangassi, Bao, Bassam, Bonro, Diele, Doussoula, Fialla, Fian, Fianra, Kankani, Kassoum, Koularé, Kourani, Mara-Grand, Mara-Petit, Ourkoum, P’Nare, Peni, Sorona, Soumara Boumba, Soumarani, Tianra, Tiao, Tombila, Toungourou, Wawara
Matya	Sourou	Lanfiéra	Guiedougou, Lanfiéra
Matya	Sourou	Tougan	Da, Dimboro, Diouroum, Dissi, Gonou, Gosson, Kassan, Kawara, Kouy, Nassan, Tougan, Tourgare, Zinzin
Matya?	Sourou	Toéni	Dagale, Domoni, Dounkou, Gome, Gon, Gorguéré, Kware-Manguel, Kware-Toksel, Louta, Toéni
Maya	Sourou	Gomboro	Ganagoulo, Gomboro, Konga, Sia
Maya	Sourou	Kiembara	Bangassogo, Gan, Goueré, Gouyalle, Kiembara, Ouelle
Maya	Sourou	Lankoué	Lankoué Samo, Rassouli, Tourouba
Maya	Sourou	Toéni	Sanan, Sanga, Semé
Maya	Sourou	Tougan	Bonou, Bouare, Boussoum, Daka, Guimou, Niankore, Touare, Yéguéré

== Sample vocabulary ==
Sample basic vocabulary of Samo dialects:

Village	Dialect	eye	ear	nose	tooth	tongue	mouth	blood	bone	water	tree	eat
Toma	Maka	jǐ	to	ɲɛ̃	sɔ	lɛwɔ	lɛ	mɑ̀	wɛ	mú	dɑ	ɑ̀mɑ́mbíː
Kouy	Matya	jɛrːɛ	toro	jiːni	sɔ̃ːnɛ	nɛnɛ	lɛ	mɪjɑ̀	jɛrɛ	mú	dɑ́	ɑnebɑ́rè
Kassoum	Matya	ɲɑ́n	toro	ɲú	sɔ̃n	nɛnɛ	lɛ	mɪjɑ̀	jɛr	mũ	dɑ́	ɑ̀nèbɛrɛ
Toéni	Matya	jɛ	toro	jí	sɛ	nɛn	li	mɑ̌ː	wɑ	mũ	jidɑ̀	mɑːbɛ̀rɛ̀
Bounou	Maya	ɲoːnì; jɛrɛ	toro	ɲinijɛrɛ	so	leːnè	lɛ	mɑ̌	jɑre	mu	dɑ	ɑfɑ́bjèrè
Kiembara	Maya	ɲɛ́nɛ̀nɛ̀	tɔrɔ	ɲìní	so	lɛ́lɑ̀ːnɑ̀	lɛ́	mɑ̌ː	jɛ̀rɛ̀	mṹ	dɑ́	ɑ̀gɑ̀bɛ̀rɛ̀
Bangassogo	Maya	jere	toro	jindì	so	lelene	le	ɲɑ̀mɑ	wɛrɛ	mú	jídɑ	ɑbɑ́brì
Lankoué	Maya	jɛrɛ	toro	sinde	sɔ̀	lemìnì	lɛ	jõ̀mɑ	wɛrɛ	mú	jidɑ̀	ɑbɑbɛ̀rɛ̀

== Writing System ==
Southern Samo alphabet
a	b	c	d	e	ɛ	ə	f	i	k	kp	l	m	n	ŋ	o	ɔ	p	r	s	t	u	w	y

Maya Samo alphabet
a	b	c	d	e	ɛ	f	g	h	i	ɩ	j	k	l	m	n	ɲ	o	ɔ	p	r	s	t	u	ʋ	w	y	z

== Notes and references ==
=== Works cited ===
- ANTBA (2011). "san mayaa spelling guide".
