= Shanga language =

Mande language of Nigeria

Shanga
- Region: Shanga, Nigeria
- Ethnicity: 20,000 (2010)
- Native speakers: 5,400 (2015 R. Jones)
- Language family: Niger–Congo: Mande; Eastern; Bisa–Busa; Samo–Busa; Busa languages; Shanga–Tyenga; Shanga

Language codes
- ISO 639-3: sho
- Glottolog: shan1282
- ELP: Shanga

Shanga (Shangawa, Shonga, Shongawa) is a Mande language of Nigeria.

== Location and status ==
Shanga is a town situated in Kebbi State, Nigeria.

The Shanga language is an endangered language and the Shanga people also speak the Hausa language. The language is only used at home. Outside home people speak Hausa. The Hausa name for the language is Shanganci or Shanganchi.

== Classification ==
Shanga is a Mande language. It is related to the Kyanga language, also known as Tyenga, spoken in Benin and Nigeria, and it form a group known as the Shanga–Tyenga languages.
