= Kyenga language =

Mande language spoken in Nigeria and Benin

Kyenga
- Tyenga
- Kyangganya
- Region: Nigeria, Benin
- Native speakers: (12,000 cited 1995–2012)
- Language family: Niger–Congo: Mande; Eastern; Bisa–Busa; Samo–Busa; Busa languages; Shanga–Tyenga; Kyenga

Language codes
- ISO 639-3: tye
- Glottolog: kyen1242

Kyangga
- Person: Kyanggani
- People: Kyanggana
- Language: Kyangganya

Kyenga (also spelled Tyenga, Tienga, Kyanga, Tyanga, Cenka, Kenga), is a Mande language of Nigeria and Benin. Usage is declining, and the Kyenga are shifting to Hausa in Nigeria and Dendi in Benin.
