= Climate of Africa =

Climate zones of Africa, showing the ecological break between the Sahara Desert (red), the hot semi-arid climate of the Sahel (orange) and the tropical climate of Central and Western Africa (blue). Southern Africa has a transition to subtropical and temperate climates (green and yellow), and more desert or semi-arid regions, centered on Namibia, Botswana, and South Africa.

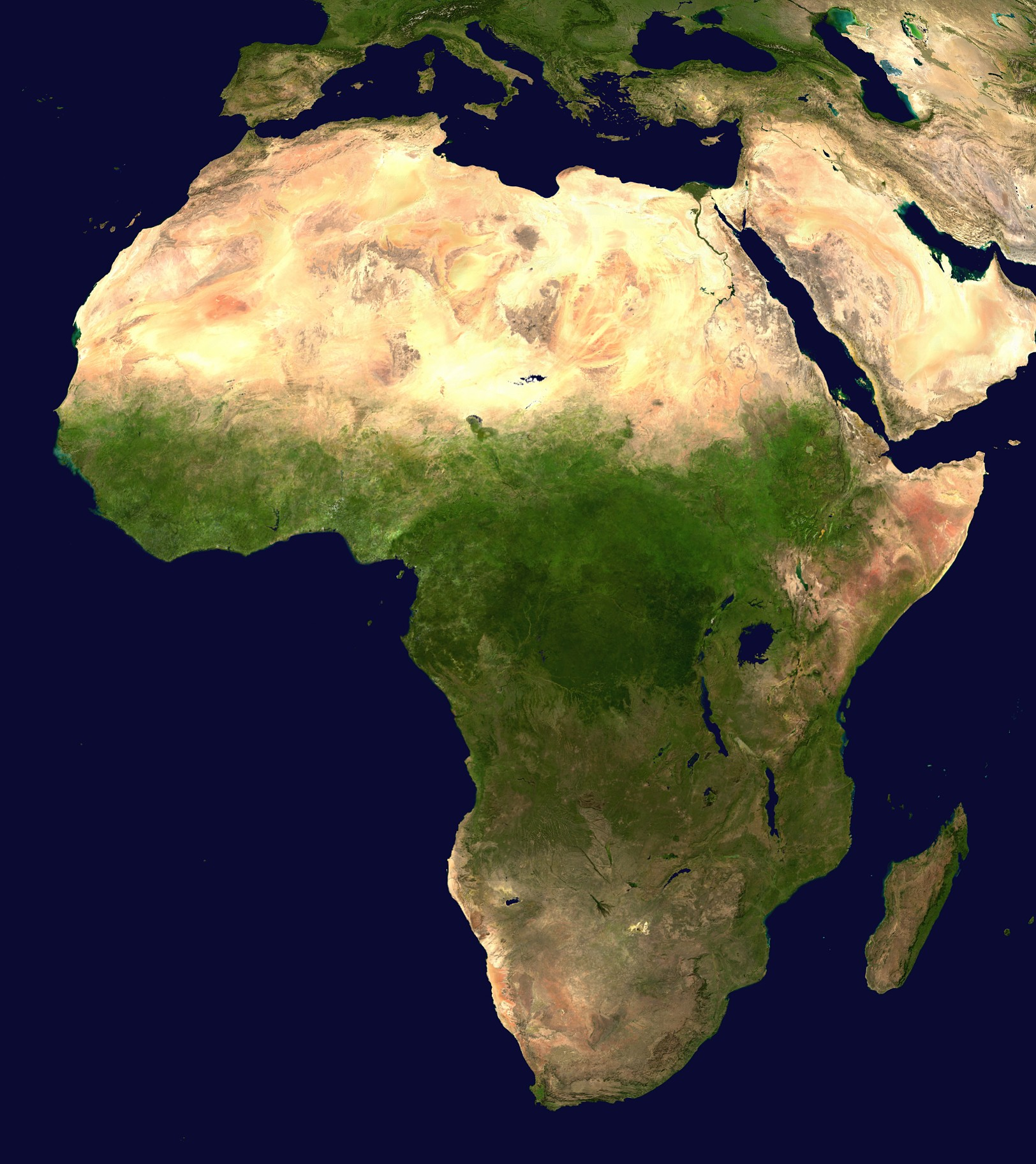
A map of Africa showing the ecological break around the Sahara Desert

The climate of Africa is a range of climates such as the equatorial climate, the tropical wet and dry climate, the tropical monsoon climate, the semi-arid climate (semi-desert and steppe), the desert climate (hyper-arid and arid), the humid subtropical climate, and the subtropical highland climate. Temperate climates are rare across the continent except at very high elevations and along the fringes. In fact, the climate of Africa is more variable by rainfall amount than by temperatures, which are consistently high. African deserts are the sunniest and the driest parts of the continent, owing to the prevailing presence of the subtropical ridge with subsiding, hot, dry air masses. Africa holds many heat-related records: the continent has the hottest extended region year-round, the areas with the hottest summer climate, the highest sunshine duration, and more.

Owing to Africa's position across equatorial and subtropical latitudes in both the northern and southern hemisphere, several different climate types can be found within it. The continent mainly lies within the intertropical zone between the Tropic of Cancer and the Tropic of Capricorn, hence its interesting density of humidity. Precipitation intensity is always high, and it is a hot continent. Warm and hot climates prevail all over Africa, but mostly the northern part is marked by aridity and high temperatures. Only the northernmost and the southernmost fringes of the continent have a Mediterranean climate. The equator runs through the middle of Africa, as do the Tropic of Cancer and the Tropic of Capricorn, making Africa the most tropical continent.

== Temperatures ==
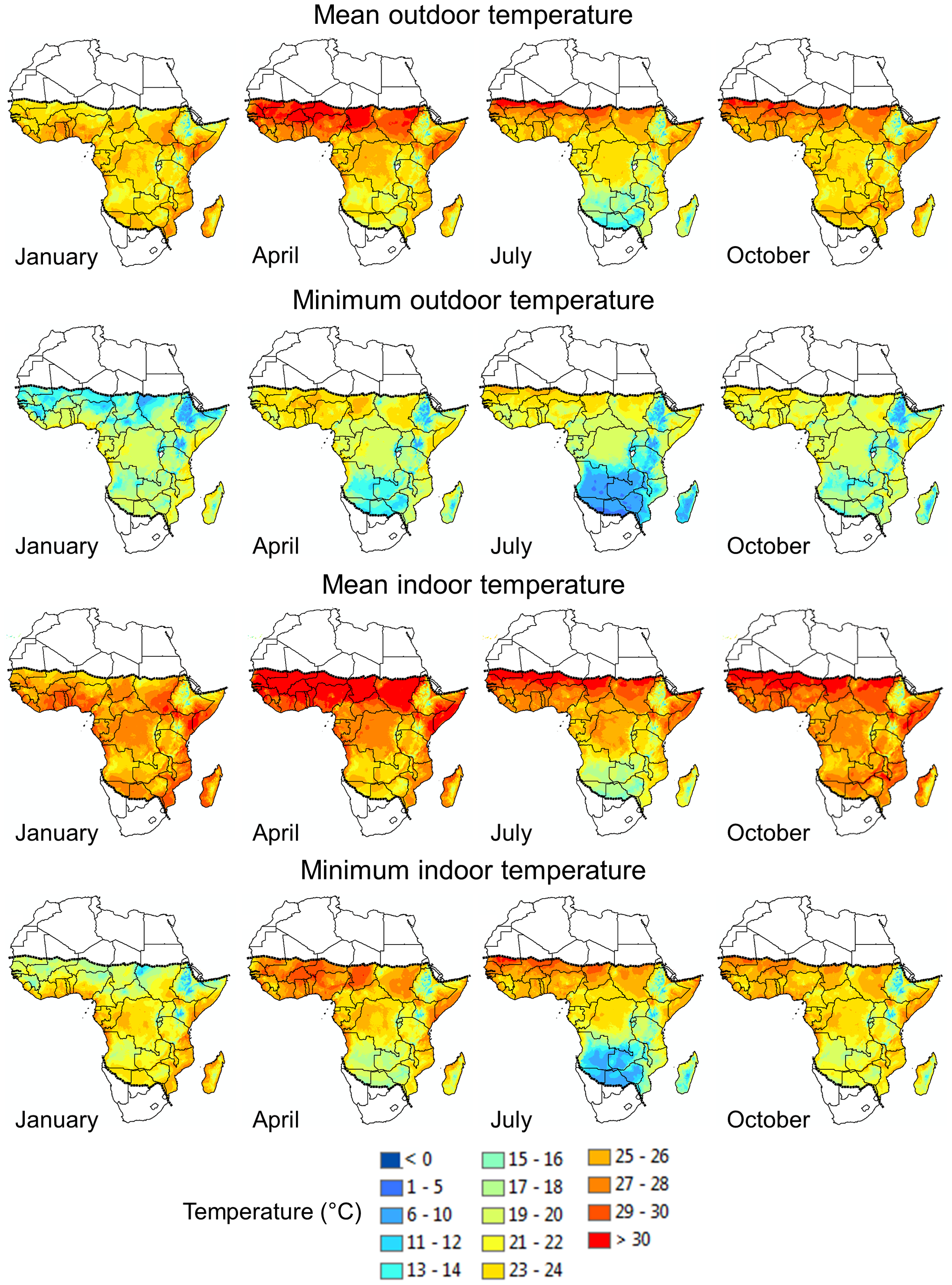
Monthly mean and minimum outdoor and indoor temperatures throughout Africa

Globally, heating of the earth near the equator leads to large amounts of upward motion and convection along the monsoon trough or Intertropical Convergence Zone. The divergence over the near-equatorial trough leads to air rising and moving away from the equator aloft. As it moves towards the Mid-Latitudes, the air cools and sinks, which leads to subsidence near the 30th parallel of both hemispheres. This circulation is known as the Hadley cell and leads to the formation of the subtropical ridge. Many of the world's deserts are caused by these climatological high-pressure areas, including the Sahara Desert.

Temperatures are hottest within the Sahara regions of Algeria and Mali, and coolest across the south and at elevation within the topography across the eastern and northwest sections of the continent. The hottest average temperature on Earth is at Dallol, Ethiopia, which averages a temperature of 33.9 °C (93.0 °F) throughout the year. The hottest temperature recorded within Africa, which was also the world record, was 57.8 °C (136.0 °F) at 'Aziziya, Libya, on 13 September 1922. This was later proven to be false, being derived from an inaccurate reading of a thermometer. The world's hottest place is in fact Death Valley, in California. Apparent temperatures, combining the effect of the temperature and humidity, along the Red Sea coast of Eritrea and Gulf of Aden coast of Somalia range between 57 °C (135 °F) and 63 °C (145 °F) during the afternoon hours. The lowest temperature measured within Africa was −24 °C (−11 °F) at Ifrane, Morocco, on 11 February 1935. Nevertheless, the major part of Africa experiences extreme heat during much of the year, especially the deserts, semi-deserts, steppes and savannas. The African deserts are arguably the hottest places on Earth, especially the Sahara Desert and the Danakil Desert, located in the Horn of Africa.

== Wind ==
The mid-level African easterly jet stream north of the equator is considered to play a crucial role in the West African monsoon, and helps form the tropical waves which march across the tropical Atlantic and the eastern part of the Pacific during the warm season. The jet exhibits both barotropic and baroclinic instability, which produces synoptic-scale, westward-propagating disturbances in the jet known as African easterly waves, or tropical waves. A small number of mesoscale storm systems embedded in these waves develop into tropical cyclones after they move from west Africa into the tropical Atlantic, mainly during August and September. When the jet lies south of normal during the peak months of the Atlantic hurricane season, tropical cyclone formation is suppressed.

Low-level jets are fast winds which form close to the surface (within 1.5 km). They affect a number of climate processes across Africa. The Somali Low-level Jet, which forms of the coast of East Africa, contributes to the existence of the Somali Desert. Low-level jets of the Sahara are known to be important for raising dust off the dry desert surface. For example, the low-level jet over Chad, is the driver of dust emission from the Bodélé Depression, the largest source of atmospheric dust on the planet. Easterly low-level jets, such as Turkana jet, which form in river valleys across the East African Rift System supply millions of tonnes of water vapour originating from the Indian Ocean across East Africa to the inner part of the continent, including the Congo rainforest. In doing so, they leave East Africa unusually dry for its latitude. Low-level southwesterlies emanating from the Gulf of Guinea are the key moisture source for the West African monsoon in northern hemisphere summer.

The Tropical Easterly Jet, which forms high up in the atmosphere, 15–17 km above the surface, is another important factor. Variations to the speed and position of this jet stream can affect rainfall in the Congo Basin and the Sahel.

== Precipitation ==
Mean precipitation map

Great parts of North Africa and Southern Africa as well as the whole Horn of Africa mainly have a hot desert climate, or a hot semi-arid climate for the wetter locations. The Sahara Desert in North Africa is the largest hot desert in the world and is one of the hottest, driest and sunniest places on Earth. Located just south of the Sahara is a narrow semi-desert steppe (a semi-arid region) called the Sahel, while Africa's most southern areas contain both savanna plains, and its central portion, including the Congo Basin, contains very dense jungle (rainforest) regions. The western equatorial region is the wettest portion of the continent. Annually, the rain belt across the continent moves northward into Sub-Saharan Africa by August, then passes back southward into south-central Africa by March. Areas with a savannah climate in Sub-Saharan Africa, such as Ghana, Burkina Faso, Darfur, Eritrea, Ethiopia, and Botswana have a distinct rainy season. El Nino results in drier-than-normal conditions in Southern Africa from December to February, and wetter-than-normal conditions in equatorial East Africa over the same period.

In Madagascar, trade winds bring moisture up the eastern slopes of the island, which is deposited as rainfall, and bring drier downsloped winds to areas south and west, leaving the western sections of the island in a rain shadow. This leads to significantly more rainfall over northeast sections of Madagascar than its southwestern portions. Southern Africa receives most of its rainfall from summer convective storms, tropical lows, mesoscale convective systems. Extratropical cyclones moving through the Westerlies, can also bring significant winter rainfall. Once a decade, tropical cyclones lead to excessive rainfall across the region.

== Snow and glaciers ==
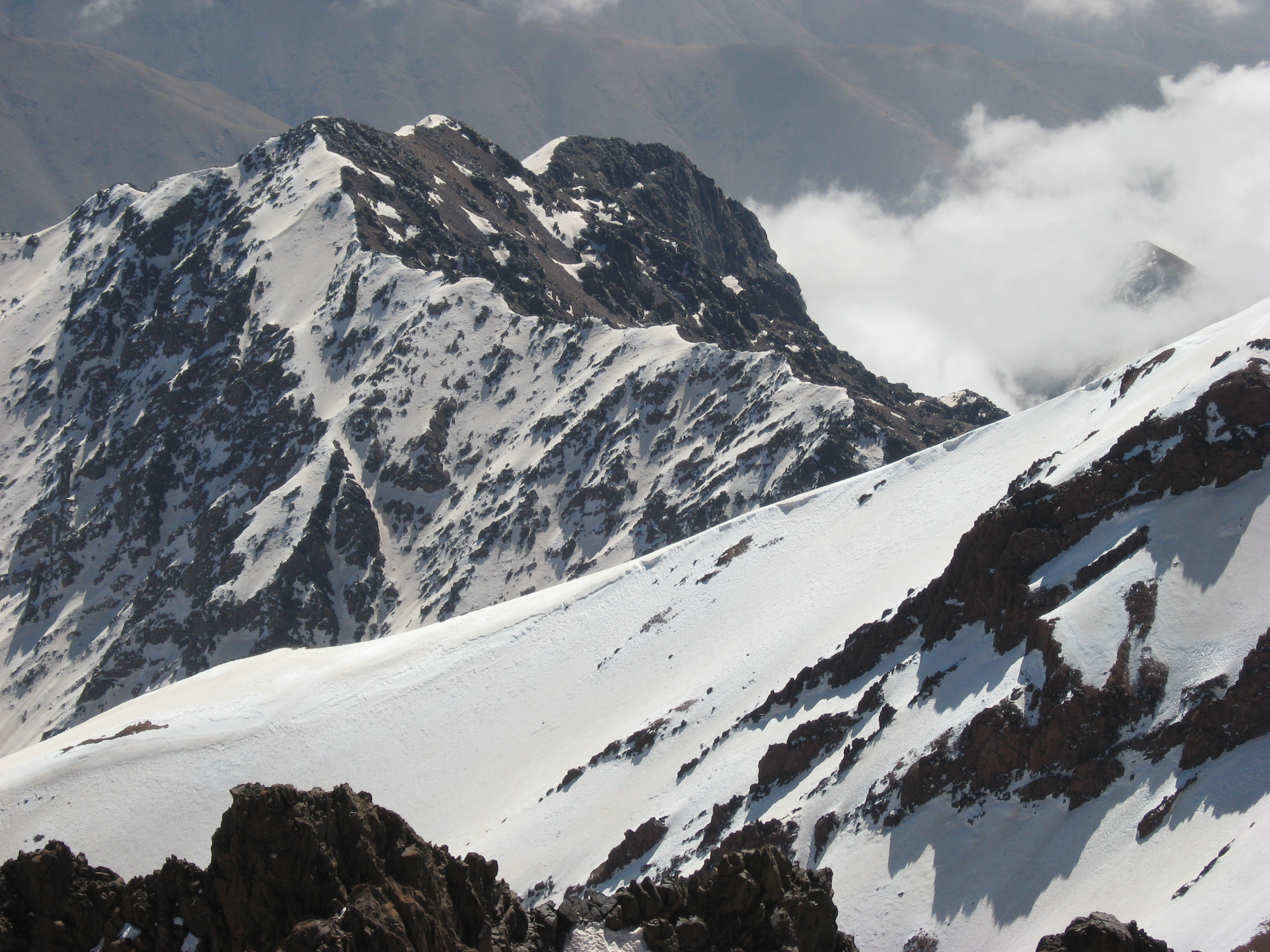
Snow in the Atlas Mountains in Morocco

Snow is an almost annual occurrence on some of the mountains of South Africa, including those of the Cedarberg and around Ceres in the South-Western Cape, and on the Drakensberg in Natal and Lesotho. Tiffendell Resort, in the Drakensberg, is the only commercial ski resort in South Africa, and has "advanced snow-making capability" allowing skiing for three months of the year. The Mountain Club of South Africa (MCSA) and the Mountain and Ski Club (MSC) of the University of Cape Town both have equipped ski huts in the Hex River mountains. Skiing including snowboarding in the Cape is a hit-and-miss affair, both in terms of timing of snowfalls, and whether there is sufficient snow to cover the rocks.

Table Mountain gets a light dusting of snow on the Front Table and also at Devil's Peak every few years. Snowfalls on Table Mountain took place on 20 September 2013; 30 August 2013; 5 August 2011; and on 15 June 2010.

Snow is a rare occurrence in Johannesburg; it fell in May 1956, August 1962, June 1964, September 1981, August 2006, and on 27 June 2007, accumulating up to 10 centimetres (3.9 in) in the southern suburbs.

Additionally, snow regularly falls in the Atlas Mountains in the Maghreb, as well as the Mediterranean regions and Sinai peninsula of Egypt. Snowfall is also a regular occurrence at Mount Kenya and Mount Kilimanjaro in Tanzania.

There have been permanent glaciers on the Rwenzori Mountains, on the border of Uganda and the Democratic Republic of the Congo. However, by the 2010s, the glaciers were in retreat, and they are under threat of disappearing through rising temperatures.

== Climate change ==
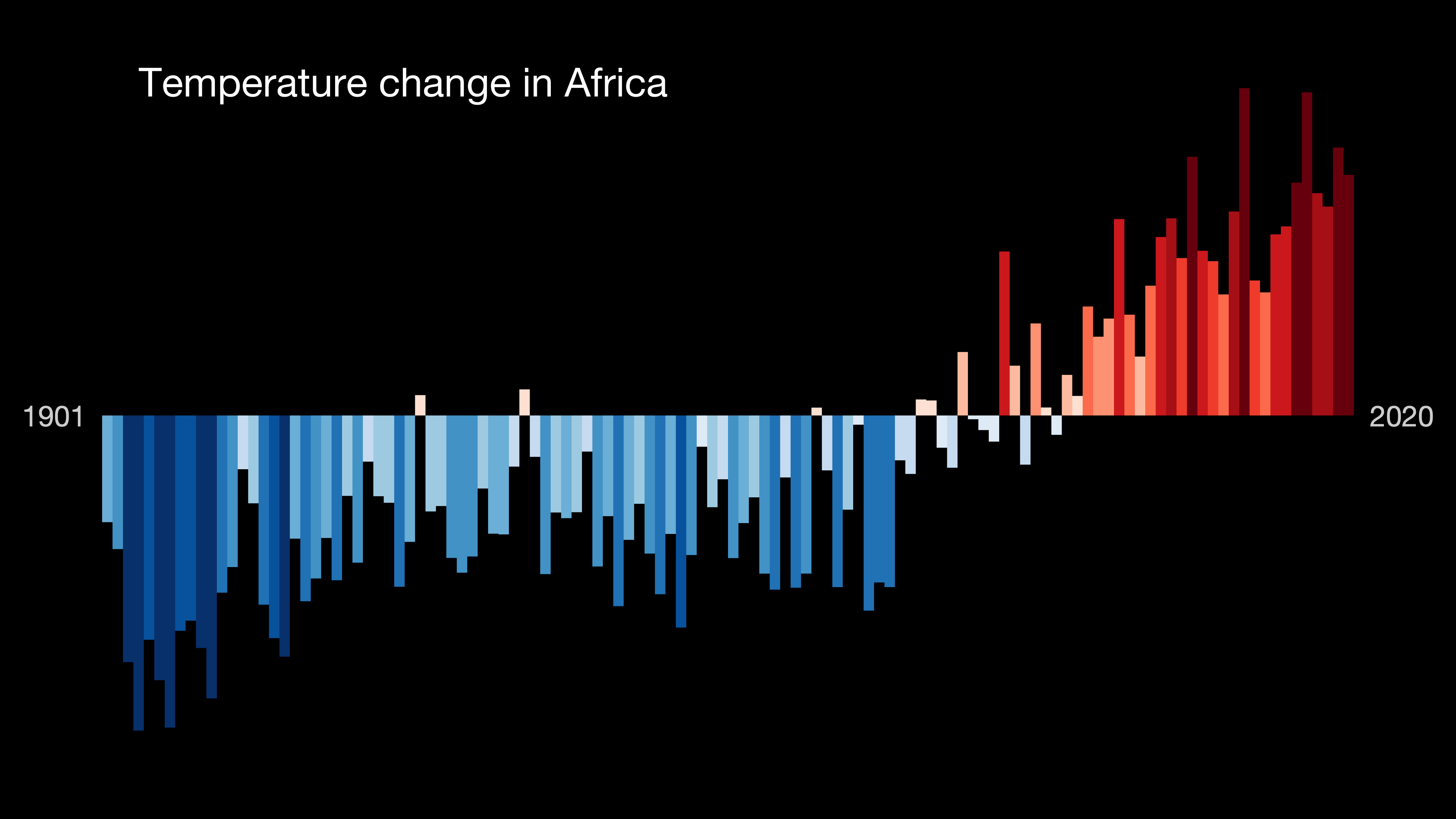
Graph showing temperature change in Africa between 1901 and 2021, with red colour being warmer and blue being colder than average (The average temperature during 1971–2000 is taken as the reference point for these changes.)

Climate change in Africa is a serious threat because the continent is one of the most vulnerable regions to the effects of climate change, despite being responsible for less than 4% of global greenhouse gas emissions. Climate change is causing increasingly erratic rainfall patterns, more frequent extreme weather events such as droughts and floods, and rising sea-surface temperatures across the continent. These changes threaten food and water security, biodiversity, public health, and economic development. Africa is currently warming faster than the rest of the world on average.

Climate change intensifies existing socioeconomic vulnerabilities. Large segments of the African population depend on climate-sensitive livelihoods such as agriculture (55 - 62% of the workforce in sub-Saharan Africa) and already live in poverty, heightening their exposure to shocks. Health outcomes worsen as heat stress, vector-borne diseases (such as malaria and dengue), and malnutrition become more prevalent. Over half (56%) of the over 2,000 recorded public health incidents in Africa between 2001 and 2021 were connected to climate change. Resource scarcity contributes to displacement and conflict, particularly in fragile regions. Urban areas, often characterized by informal settlements, face heightened risks from flooding and extreme heat.

Agriculture is one of the most vulnerable sectors, as most African farmers rely on rainfed crops. Reduced and unpredictable rainfall, combined with higher temperatures, drives soil moisture loss, desertification (especially in the Sahara) and shifts suitable growing areas. These changes lower yields of staple crops, undermining food security and worsening hunger. Livestock health is increasingly compromised by heat stress and shifting disease patterns. Coastal and marine ecosystems face warming seas and rising levels, which threaten fisheries and densely populated coastal settlements.

The economic toll of climate change is severe. On average African countries face climate-related losses amounting to 2-5% of GDP annually, while adaptation costs in sub-Sahran Africa are projected at USD 30-50 billion per year over the next decade. This threatens development gains and places pressure on governments and international institutions to mobilise climate finance.

Africa's climate change adaptation strategies focus on building resilience through climate-smart agriculture, sustainable water management, ecosystem conservation, and strengthening health and infrastructure systems. These approaches prioritise enhancing governance, mobilising climate finance and investment, and fostering community participation to address vulnerability holistically. Continental and national frameworks emphasise multi-sectoral coordination, technology adoption, and capacity building to support sustainable development and reduce climate risks.

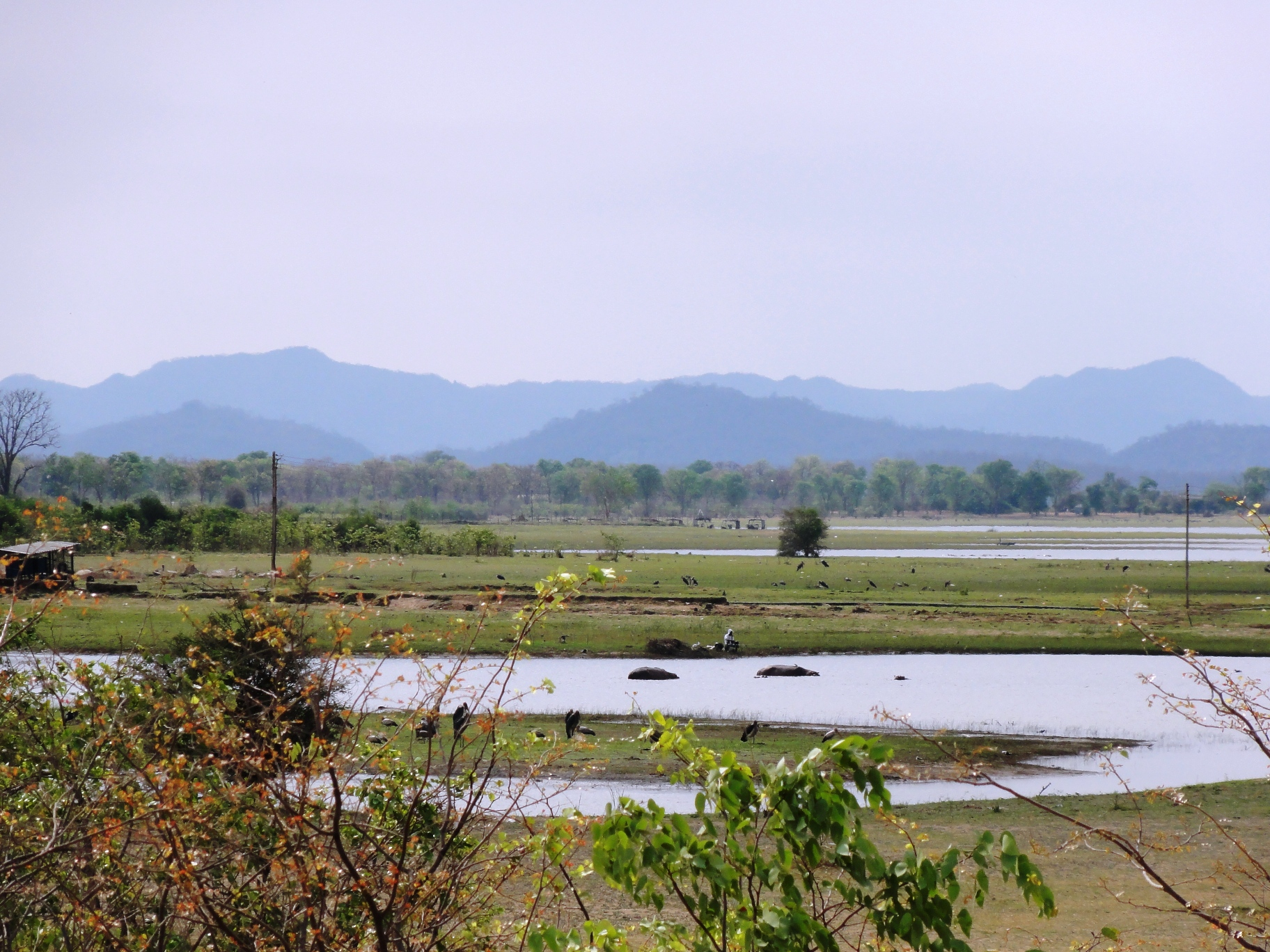
Lake kariba

In chapter 9 of the IPCC Sixth Assessment Report, it is reported that although greenhouse gas emissions are among the lowest in Africa, anthropogenic climate change has severely threatened daily life. People experience extreme food insecurity, high mortality rates, major biodiversity loss, and more as a result of global warming. Additionally, because of reduced economic activity and growth and inequities in funding, the ability for adaptation to these conditions is also reduced.

== Severe weather ==
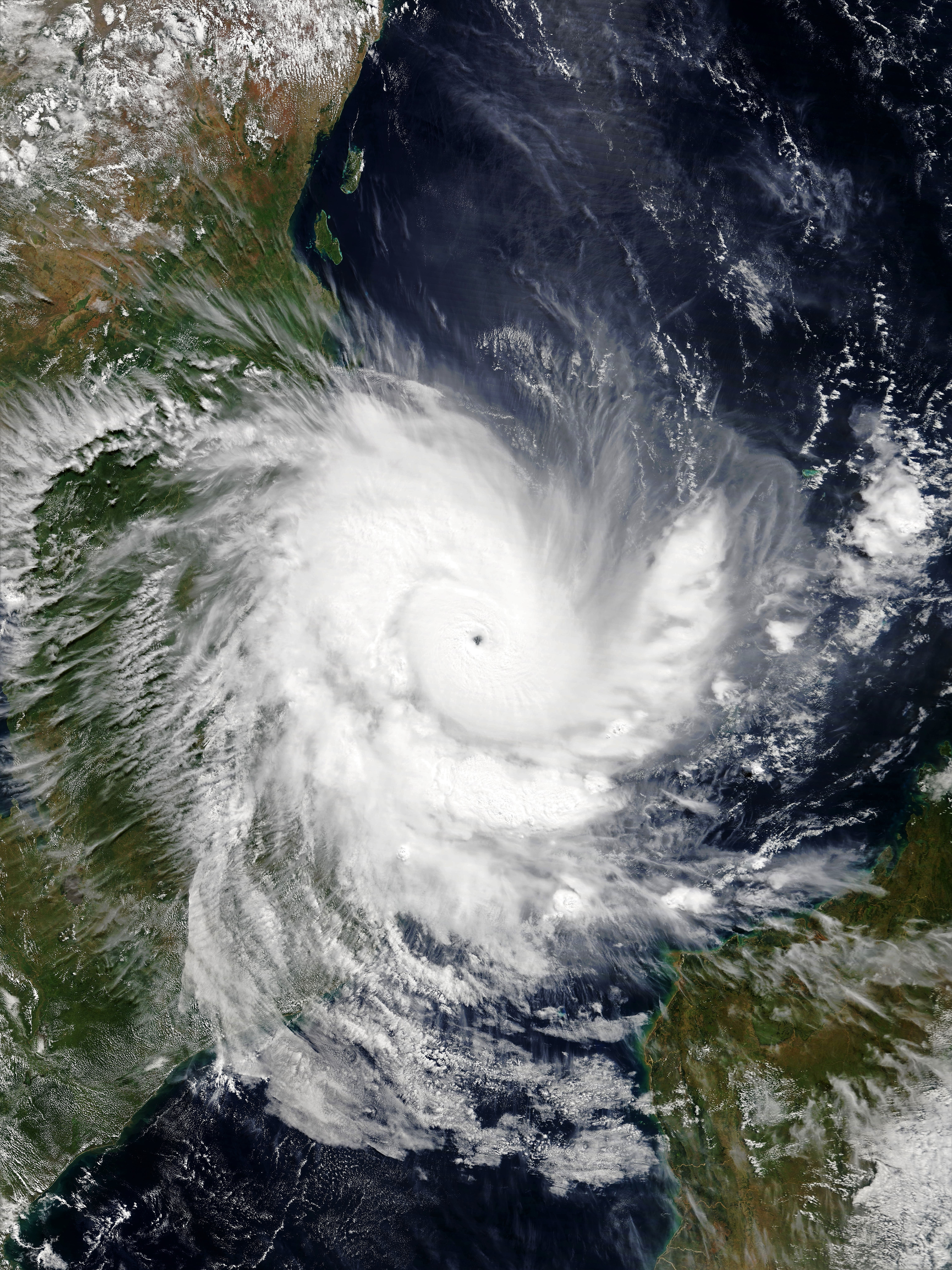
Satellite image of Cyclone Kenneth in 2019 striking Mozambique

=== Tornadoes ===
Tornadoes can occur regularly in South Africa along the eastern coast with the Indian Ocean.

=== Tropical cyclones ===
Powerful tropical cyclones regularly affect southeastern Africa. On average, 1.5 tropical cyclones strike Madagascar each year, which is the most affected area in Africa. In March 1927, a tropical cyclone struck eastern Madagascar, killing at least 500 people. In March 2004, Cyclone Gafilo hit northeastern Madagascar as one of the island's strongest ever cyclones, killing 363 people, leaving US$250 million in damage. In March 2019, Cyclone Idai hit central Mozambique and killed 1,302 people across Southern Africa, – affecting more than 3 million people. Total damages from Idai across Mozambique, Zimbabwe, Madagascar, and Malawi were estimated to be at least $2.2 billion (2019 USD). Roughly one month later, Cyclone Kenneth struck northern Mozambique as the country's strongest ever landfall. In 2020, Cyclone Freddy struck Mozambique in two different locations, producing widespread rainfall that killed 1,434 people along its path, mostly in Malawi.

Occasionally, cyclones in the Mediterranean can affect northern Africa, and which also have characteristics of a tropical cyclone. In September 2023, Storm Daniel moved ashore Libya and produced heavy rainfall, producing flash flooding after two dams failed. The storm killed at least 4,333 people in the country, becoming the deadliest storm to hit Africa in recorded history. In September 1969, a cyclone in the Mediterranean Sea killed nearly 600 people in Tunisia and Libya. Cyclones from the Indian Ocean can strike the Horn of Africa. In November 2013, a deep depression struck Somalia and killed 162 people while also causing extensive livestock damage. The temperature contrast between the hot Sahara Desert in northern Africa and the cooler Gulf of Guinea to the south produces the African easterly jet, which generates tropical waves, or an elongated area of low pressure. These waves are often the formation source of Atlantic and Pacific hurricanes.

=== Weather forecasting infrastructure ===
Africa's weather forecasting infrastructure is significantly underdeveloped, affecting its ability to manage severe weather events. With a population of approximately 1.2 billion, Africa only has 37 weather radar stations, in stark contrast to the 636 stations in the United States and European Union. This scarcity of weather stations and early warning systems leads to inadequate disaster preparedness and response, compounded by maintenance issues with many existing radar systems. The lack of proper infrastructure results in high fatality rates and extensive damage during disasters. For instance, in 2023, severe flooding and landslides around Lake Kivu resulted in at least 600 deaths, and Cyclone Idai in East Africa caused over 1,000 deaths due to insufficient early warnings. These incidents underscore the urgency of investing in early warning systems, which can significantly reduce damage and save lives. The World Meteorological Organization suggests that an $800 million investment in developing countries could prevent annual losses of $3 to $16 billion.

== See also ==
- Climate of South Africa
- Earth rainfall climatology
