= Teleconnection =

Climate anomalies related at large distances

Teleconnection in atmospheric science refers to climate anomalies being related to each other at large distances (typically thousands of kilometers). The most emblematic teleconnection is that linking sea-level pressure at Tahiti and Darwin, Australia, which defines the Southern Oscillation. Another well-known teleconnection links the sea-level pressure over Iceland with the one over the Azores, traditionally defining the North Atlantic Oscillation (NAO).

== History ==
Teleconnections were first noted by the British meteorologist Sir Gilbert Walker in the late 19th century, through computation of the correlation between time series of atmospheric pressure, temperature and rainfall. They served as a building block for the understanding of climate variability, by showing that the latter was not purely random.

Indeed, the term El Niño–Southern Oscillation (ENSO) is an implicit acknowledgment that the phenomenon underlies variability in several locations at once. It was later noticed that associated teleconnections occurred all over North America, as embodied by the Pacific–North American teleconnection pattern.

In the 1980s, improved observations allowed detection of teleconnections at larger distances throughout the troposphere. Concomitantly, the theory emerged that such patterns could be understood through the dispersion of Rossby waves due to the spherical geometry of the Earth. This is sometimes called the "proto-model".

== Theory ==
Teleconnections within the tropical Pacific began to be understood thanks to the idealized calculations of A.E. Gill and later through more complex models.

Building upon the "proto-model", much of the early theory of teleconnections dealt with a barotropic, linearized model of atmospheric flow about a constant mean state. However, the model was soon invalidated when it was discovered that actual teleconnection patterns were nearly insensitive to the location of the forcing, in direct contradiction with the predictions offered by this simple picture. Simmons and collaborators showed that if a more realistic background state was prescribed, it would become unstable, leading to a similar pattern regardless of the location of the forcing, in accordance to observations. This "modal" property turned out to be an artifact of the barotropicity of the model, though it has appeared for more subtle reasons in more realistic models.

More recent work has shown that most teleconnections from the tropics to the extratropics can be understood to surprising accuracy by the propagation of linear, planetary waves upon a 3-dimensional seasonally-varying basic state. Because the patterns are persistent over time and somewhat "locked" to geographical features such as mountain ranges, these waves are called stationary.

Another mechanism of teleconnection between tropical oceans and midlatitude regions is symmetric along latitude circles (i.e. "zonal") and between hemispheres, unlike the stationary wave mechanism. It relies on interactions between transient eddies and the mean atmospheric flow that are mutually reinforcing (i.e. non-linear). It has been shown to explain some aspects of ENSO teleconnections in temperature and rainfall. Other authors suggested, as well, a correlation between many teleconnection patterns and local climate change factors.

== Applications ==
Since tropical sea surface temperatures are predictable up to two years ahead of time, knowledge of teleconnection patterns gives some amount of predictability in remote locations with an outlook sometimes as long as a few seasons. For instance, predicting El Niño enables prediction of North American rainfall, snowfall, droughts or temperature patterns with a few weeks to months lead time. In Sir Gilbert Walker's time, a strong El Niño usually meant a weaker Indian monsoon, but this anticorrelation has weakened in the 1980s and 1990s, for controversial reasons. For Western Europe, knowledge of the NAO can aid the predictability of patterns of temperature and precipitation. For instance, wintertime NAO+ is associated with stronger westerlies and increased precipitation over Northern Europe, whereas NAO- often corresponds to dry and cold periods over Northern Europe and increased storminess over Southern Europe.

== See also ==
- Sudden stratospheric warming
- African easterly jet
- Tropical Easterly Jet
- Somali Jet
