= History of the wheel in Africa =

Wheel in Africa

The wheel in Africa was used, to various extents, throughout the history of Africa, beginning in the Bronze Age in northern Africa and following its introduction by European traders in parts of sub-Saharan Africa. While it may have been common for Africans to manually carry their goods or use pack animals to transport economic goods in Africa, there was awareness, knowledge, and use of wheeled transports (e.g., carts, carriages, chariots, wagons) in Africa. However, the environment in some parts of tropical Africa, as well as alternative forms of travel and transport, such as via canoe and beasts of burden/riding animals (e.g., donkeys, horses, camels), may have resulted in decreased use of animal-drawn wheeled transport in Africa. The wheel was also given other technical applications in Africa, such as a water wheel and a potter's wheel.

== Environment ==
While the wheel and animal-drawn wheeled transports were usable in the arid environment of the ancient Sahara, and usable in the sparsely wooded, level, arid environment of the ancient Sahel, the environment of the ancient Sudan may have made it rather impractical due to there being a lack of paved roads and seasonal rains. The tse-tse fly belt is also distributed throughout the environment of tropical Africa, which is a region of increased risk for livestock and the spread of disease among livestock. Additionally, compared to the drying environment of the ancient Sahara, use of canoes to travel and transport goods along local and regional waterways, such as Lake Chad, the Niger River, and the Senegal River, may have been a much more efficient means of travel and transport in the ancient Sudan. In the Sudan, the early use of donkeys and horses, as well as the later use of camels, as beasts of burden and riding animals may have also been more suitable compared to their use as draft animals; consequently, their use in the Sudan may have spread rapidly, and their use may have also rapidly displaced the use of animal-drawn wheeled transports in the Sahara.

== Uses ==
The wheel was given various technical applications in Africa, such as a water wheel, a potter's wheel, and an animal-drawn wheeled transport of various types — carts, carriages, chariots, and wagons.

== History ==
=== North Africa ===
In the 5th century BCE, Herodotus reported use of chariots by Garamantes in the Saharan region of North Africa.

In the 1st century CE, Strabo reported use of chariots by Nigretes and Pharusii in the Saharan region of North Africa.

==== Algeria ====
Rock art engravings of ox-drawn wagons and horse-driven chariots can be found in Algeria, Libya, southern Morocco, Mauritania, and Niger.

Between 3200 BP and 1000 BP, various Central Saharan rock art sites from the Horse Period were created depicting charioteers, mostly upon horse-driven chariots and rarely upon cattle-driven chariots; these painted and engraved depictions were distributed in 81 painted and 120 engraved depictions in Algeria, 18 painted and 44 engraved depictions in Libya, 6 engraved depictions in Mali, 125 engraved depictions in Mauritania, 96 engraved depictions in Morocco, 29 engraved depictions in Niger, and 21 engraved depictions in Western Sahara, and were likely created by the Garamantes, whose ancestors were ancient Berbers and Saharan pastoralists.

==== Egypt ====
Ancient Egyptians may have been aware of the wheel since the 5th Dynasty (ca. 25th century BCE).

During the 13th Dynasty (ca. 18th century BCE), the earliest wheeled transport emerged in ancient Egypt.

By the 4th century BCE, the water wheel, particularly the noria and sakia, was created in ancient Egypt.

==== Libya ====
Rock art engravings of ox-drawn wagons and horse-driven chariots can be found in Algeria, Libya, southern Morocco, Mauritania, and Niger.

Between 3200 BP and 1000 BP, various Central Saharan rock art sites from the Horse Period were created depicting charioteers, mostly upon horse-driven chariots and rarely upon cattle-driven chariots; these painted and engraved depictions were distributed in 81 painted and 120 engraved depictions in Algeria, 18 painted and 44 engraved depictions in Libya, 6 engraved depictions in Mali, 125 engraved depictions in Mauritania, 96 engraved depictions in Morocco, 29 engraved depictions in Niger, and 21 engraved depictions in Western Sahara, and were likely created by the Garamantes, whose ancestors were ancient Berbers and Saharan pastoralists.

==== Morocco ====
Rock art engravings of ox-drawn wagons and horse-driven chariots can be found in Algeria, Libya, southern Morocco, Mauritania, and Niger.

Between 3200 BP and 1000 BP, various Central Saharan rock art sites from the Horse Period were created depicting charioteers, mostly upon horse-driven chariots and rarely upon cattle-driven chariots; these painted and engraved depictions were distributed in 81 painted and 120 engraved depictions in Algeria, 18 painted and 44 engraved depictions in Libya, 6 engraved depictions in Mali, 125 engraved depictions in Mauritania, 96 engraved depictions in Morocco, 29 engraved depictions in Niger, and 21 engraved depictions in Western Sahara, and were likely created by the Garamantes, whose ancestors were ancient Berbers and Saharan pastoralists.

==== Sudan ====
The potter's wheel was introduced into ancient Nubia by ancient Egypt. The wheelhead of a potter's wheel, which was made of clay and dated to 1850 BCE, was found at Askut.

Since the Meroe period, ox-powered water wheels, specifically saqiya, and shaduf were used in Nubia.

==== Western Sahara ====
Between 3200 BP and 1000 BP, various Central Saharan rock art sites from the Horse Period were created depicting charioteers, mostly upon horse-driven chariots and rarely upon cattle-driven chariots; these painted and engraved depictions were distributed in 81 painted and 120 engraved depictions in Algeria, 18 painted and 44 engraved depictions in Libya, 6 engraved depictions in Mali, 125 engraved depictions in Mauritania, 96 engraved depictions in Morocco, 29 engraved depictions in Niger, and 21 engraved depictions in Western Sahara, and were likely created by the Garamantes, whose ancestors were ancient Berbers and Saharan pastoralists.

=== East Africa ===
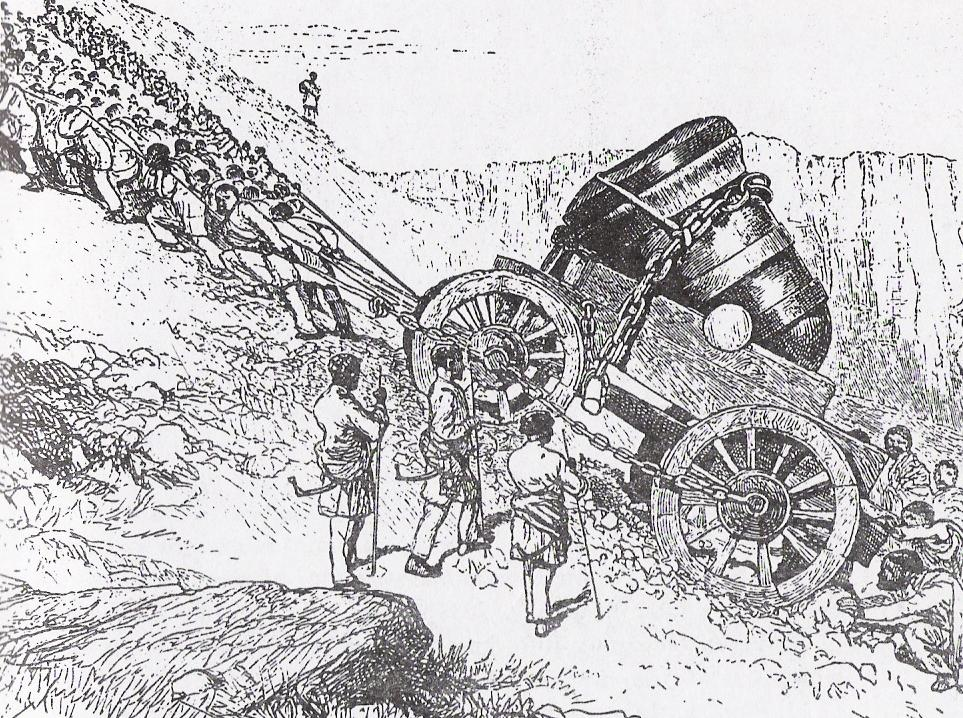
Tewodros II soldiers dragging the great Sebastopol cannon (19th century)

==== Ethiopia ====
The 6th-century Byzantine historian John Malalas recorded that an ambassador sent by Emperor Justinian to Aksum saw King Kaleb riding a carriage drawn by four elephants.

In the medieval era, archaeological evidence uncovered by American archaeologist Samuel Walker at Tegulet, a site in northern Ethiopia, revealed a road with ruts caused by the passage of wheeled vehicles perhaps over several centuries.

=== West Africa ===
==== Benin ====
In 1670 CE, the king of Allada was gifted a gilded carriage, along with a horse bit and horse harness, by the French West India Company.

In 1772 CE, a European account reported the observed use of two coaches in a procession, which were carried by twelve men each as part of a ceremony in the kingdom of Dahomey, at Abomey.

Between 1789 CE and 1797 CE, king Agonglo of Dahomey owned a carriage, which was still intact during the 1870s CE.

Throughout the 19th century CE, numerous Europeans accounts reported the observed use of many wheeled transports, including carriages, which were part of ceremonial processions in the kingdom of Dahomey.

In 1845 CE, the kingdom of Dahomey used a cart against Badagry, resulting in it later being seized.

In 1850 CE, a European account in the kingdom of Dahomey detailed: "'a glass-coach, the handiwork of Hoo-ton-gee, a native artist-a square with four large windows, on wheels', and also '...[a] wheeled-chair with a huge bird before it, on wheels of Dahomey make...[a] warrior on wheels, Dahomey make,...[and a] Dahoman-made chair on wheels, covered with handsome country cloth'."

In 1864 CE, a European account detailed Dahomey carriages "'of home, or native manufacture', including 'a blue-green shandridan, with two short flagstaffs attached to the front'."

In 1871 CE, a European account in the kingdom of Dahomey detailed: "'a dark green coach, evidently of native manufacture'."

==== Ghana ====
In 1841 CE, Asantehene Kwaku Dua I was gifted a carriage by the Methodist Missionary Society.

==== Mali ====
Between 3200 BP and 1000 BP, various Central Saharan rock art sites from the Horse Period were created depicting charioteers, mostly upon horse-driven chariots and rarely upon cattle-driven chariots; these painted and engraved depictions were distributed in 81 painted and 120 engraved depictions in Algeria, 18 painted and 44 engraved depictions in Libya, 6 engraved depictions in Mali, 125 engraved depictions in Mauritania, 96 engraved depictions in Morocco, 29 engraved depictions in Niger, and 21 engraved depictions in Western Sahara, and were likely created by the Garamantes, whose ancestors were ancient Berbers and Saharan pastoralists.

In the 18th century, Abd Salam Shabeni reported the use of the shaduf and water wheel at Timbuktu.

==== Mauritania ====
Rock art engravings of ox-drawn wagons and horse-driven chariots can be found in Algeria, Libya, southern Morocco, Mauritania, and Niger.

Between 3200 BP and 1000 BP, various Central Saharan rock art sites from the Horse Period were created depicting charioteers, mostly upon horse-driven chariots and rarely upon cattle-driven chariots; these painted and engraved depictions were distributed in 81 painted and 120 engraved depictions in Algeria, 18 painted and 44 engraved depictions in Libya, 6 engraved depictions in Mali, 125 engraved depictions in Mauritania, 96 engraved depictions in Morocco, 29 engraved depictions in Niger, and 21 engraved depictions in Western Sahara, and were likely created by the Garamantes, whose ancestors were ancient Berbers and Saharan pastoralists.

At Dhar Tichitt, there is Neolithic rock art that depicts a human figure with a link in their hand, connecting him to yoked oxen that are pulling a cart. At Dhar Walata, there is Neolithic rock art that depicts a human figure in relation to an ox cart.

At Bled Initi, which is a hamlet near Akreijit, there are two depictions of ox carts that have been estimated to date between 650 BCE and 380 BCE, and are consistent with the artistic style of other aspects of the Dhar Tichitt Early Iconographic Tradition.

==== Niger ====
Rock art engravings of ox-drawn wagons and horse-driven chariots can be found in Algeria, Libya, southern Morocco, Mauritania, and Niger.

Between 3200 BP and 1000 BP, various Central Saharan rock art sites from the Horse Period were created depicting charioteers, mostly upon horse-driven chariots and rarely upon cattle-driven chariots; these painted and engraved depictions were distributed in 81 painted and 120 engraved depictions in Algeria, 18 painted and 44 engraved depictions in Libya, 6 engraved depictions in Mali, 125 engraved depictions in Mauritania, 96 engraved depictions in Morocco, 29 engraved depictions in Niger, and 21 engraved depictions in Western Sahara, and were likely created by the Garamantes, whose ancestors were ancient Berbers and Saharan pastoralists.

At Tondia, in Niger, rock art portrays an ox cart; the use of the ox cart in Saharan West Africa may have begun to decline in use as transport by camel increased between the 4th century CE and the medieval period.

==== Nigeria ====
In the 18th century, Abd Salam Shabeni reported the use the potter's wheel by the Hausa people.

In 1824 CE, the king of Lagos gifted a large-sized carriage to the emperor of Brazil.

During the 1840s CE, king Eyamba V of Old Calabar acquired two horse-drawn carriages.

In 1866 CE, a European account reported the observed use of a carriage in a procession, which was part of a ceremony in the kingdom of Borno, at Kukawa.

In 1870 CE, a European account reported the observed use of a mule-drawn carriage in a ceremonial procession, which was gifted to the Shehu of Borno by British explorers in 1851 CE, at Kukawa.

=== Southern Africa ===
==== Botswana ====
At Tsodilo Hills, in Botswana, white painted rock art likely dating from c. 1852 AD may depict a wagon and wagon wheel.
