= AEJ =

AEJ may refer to:

- Air Express, Tanzanian airline (former ICAO Code)
- Association of European Journalists
- A. E. J. Collins, prominent cricketer
- African easterly jet
- American Economic Journal, a group of four peer-reviewed academic journals in economics
- Asia Europe Journal, a quarterly journal dedicated to publishing quality academic papers and policy discussions on common challenges facing Asia and Europe
