= 2018–2021 Southern African drought =

Ongoing period of drought in Southern Africa

The 2018–2021 Southern Africa drought was a period of drought that took place in Southern Africa. The drought began in late October 2018, and negatively affected food security in the region. In mid-August 2019, the drought was classified as a level 2 Red-Class event by the Global Disaster Alert and Coordination System. The alert level was reduced to the Orange-1.7 by 12 December 2019, as the new wet season had started. In September 2020, the drought was classified as a level 2 Red-Class event. The drought continued into early 2021. Beginning in October 2021, South Africa experienced above average rainfall and reservoirs refilled by early 2022.

== Description ==
=== Background ===
As a region, Southern Africa has historically been at high risk of droughts; a probability due to several meteorological and sociological factors.

The Southern African climate is affected by strong seasonal rainfall patterns; the majority of the region's annual rainfall is deposited by storms from early November to March, forming what is considered Southern Africa's wet season. The wet months of rainfall saturate the region's soil, providing moisture that persists for the drier months of the year. While this cycle is normally reliable, anomalies in the climate—such as El Niño events—disrupt the region's annual level of rainfall; this, in turn, causes the decline of the region's plant life, the lowering of water levels in bodies of water and a loss of moisture from the soil, with the latter effect causing a drought.

As noted by sources, Southern Africa's low level of economic development and reliance on agriculture—namely cereal crops and livestock—leave the region highly susceptible to droughts. Though variations exist, the region's farmers tend to plant their next crop in late October—this sowing is timed with the expected rains that begin to arrive in November. The next five-six months are considered the "lean" season, during which time stockpiled food is consumed while the concurrent "wet" season rains nourish the next year's crops. However, if the usual rains are disrupted by a weather anomaly, planting is delayed until November or early December, resulting in a longer "lean" season before crops can be harvested. If the region's weather patterns are disrupted enough to cause drought, the lack of rainfall and eventual loss of moisture from soil often results in a noteworthy decline in Southern Africa's agricultural production; the resulting detrimental economic conditions lead to social unrest and a decline in the level of regional food security.

Periods of drought effect Southern Africa's various biomes and wildlife, while reduced water levels in rivers can cause hydroelectric dams to operate at reduced capacity. El Niño events in Southern Africa also increase the likelihood of African armyworm outbreaks, further decreasing the region's agricultural output.

=== Previous droughts ===
In the late 2015 – early 2016 season, an El Niño event caused a drought in some parts of Southern Africa. As of the start of the 2018-19 ongoing El Niño-induced drought, some parts of Southern Africa had not yet recovered from the effects of the earlier drought.

In Namibia, the drought of 2012/2013 was thought to be the worst of the decade as around 42% if the total population experienced food insecurity. The Namibian government declared a state of emergency in 2012.

== 2018–2021 drought ==
=== Initial warning ===
In August and September 2018, several organizations began to warn farmers about the possibility of an oncoming drought. In August 2018 the Southern African Development Community advised farmers to avoid selling some of their stockpiled food from the previous season, and in September 2018 the United Nations Food and Agriculture Organization (FAO) issued a warning to Southern African countries about the formation of conditions for a drought. Patrick Kormawa, the Sub-Regional Coordinator for FAO in Southern Africa, predicted a 40 percent chance the region would be impacted by an El Niño event in Fall 2018.

=== Current drought ===
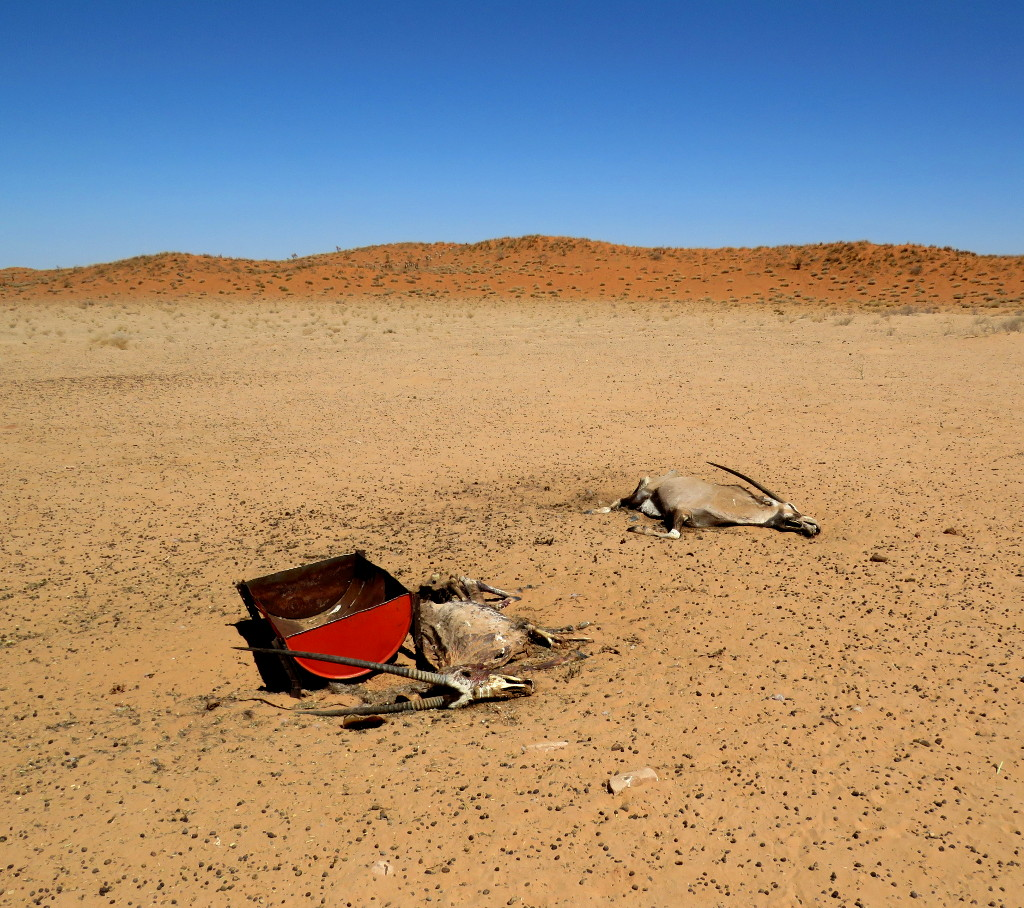
Dead oryx in Namibia.

In spring 2018, an El Niño event disrupted Southern Africa's annual rainfall. The first effect of this disruption was a delayed sowing date, which was pushed back from late October to early November. In November, a report by the United Nations Office for the Coordination of Humanitarian Affairs (OCHA) reported an 80 percent likelihood of the El Niño event continuing until December; it also noted that 9.6 million people in Southern Africa were severely food-insecure as of the start of the 2019 lean season.

The drought continued to 2019 with multiple regions in Southern Africa seeing significantly reduced levels of rainfall. A report from FAO noted that, while rainfall had picked up in late December 2018, several areas within the region were suffering from a severe drought and accompanying effects.

As of April 2019, parts of Southern Africa remain affected by the ongoing drought. Heavier than average rainfall during the first weeks of February in some locales have alleviated local droughts, but the area as a whole is expected to suffer from negatively impacted cropping conditions. Rates of hunger in the region have risen, and are expected to continue to rise.

The drought was re-declared as national emergency in South Africa 4 March 2020. 17 March 2020 the black market of stolen water was reported in Nelson Mandela Bay Metropolitan Municipality amidst emergency-related corruption concerns.

In May 2019, Namibia declared a state of emergency in response to the drought, and extended it by additional 6 months in October 2019. This is the third time in six years the government has declared a state of emergency. The drought of 2019 has been described as the worst in the last 90 years in the country, with the lowest recorded rainfall in Windhoek since 1891.

The agricultural sector is one of Namibia's primary industries and due to extremely low rainfall in 2019, production in the sector fell by 17.5%. Grazing land conditions were observed to have deteriorated to a very poor state in many parts of the country leading to severe pressure on the grazing and to a severe decline in livestock due to starvation. A combination of lack of rainfall and low soil moisture led to a severe and prolonged drought in 2019 which resulted in real hardship and significantly affected many livelihoods, especially among the most vulnerable communities.

In August 2020 a vulnerability assessment conducted by the Namibian government found 427,905 Namibian people are currently food insecure. Factors that contribute to this insecurity includes the impact of droughts, floods, pests and worms.

== See also ==
- 2020–21 North American drought
- Eastern Cape drought
- Victoria Falls
- 2021–2022 Madagascar famine
