= Jet stream =

Fast-flowing atmospheric air current

The polar jet stream can travel at speeds greater than 180 km/h (110 mph). Here, the fastest winds are coloured red; slower winds are blue.

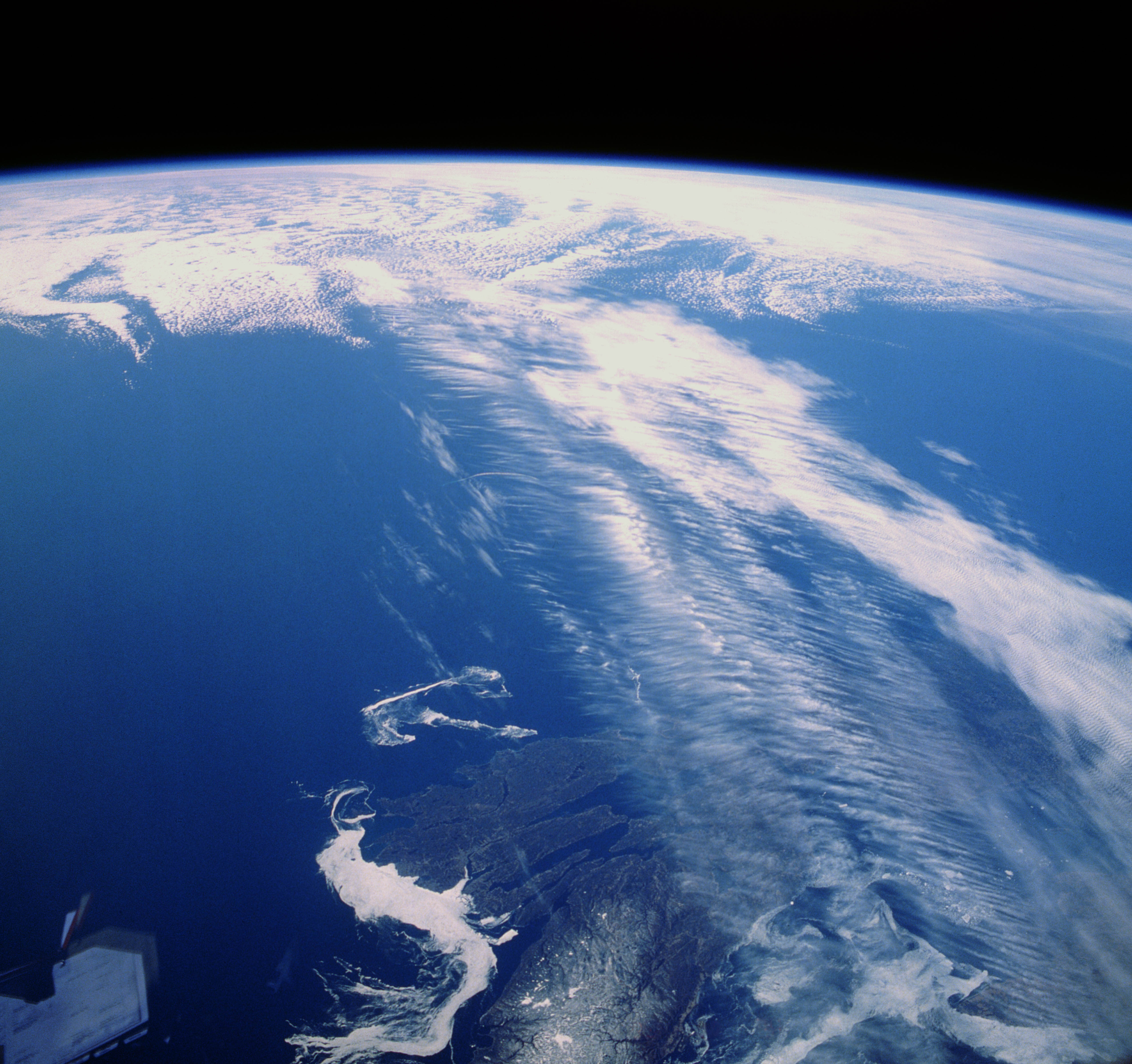
Clouds along a jet stream over Canada.

Jet streams are fast flowing, narrow air currents in the atmosphere. It is the physical mechanism of a teleconnection. The main terrestrial jet streams are located near the altitude of the tropopause and are westerly winds, flowing west to east around the globe. The Northern Hemisphere and the Southern Hemisphere each have a polar jet around their respective polar vortex at around 30,000 ft (5.7 mi; 9.1 km) above sea level and typically travelling at around 110 mph (180 km/h) although often considerably faster. Closer to the equator, somewhat higher and somewhat weaker, is a subtropical jet.

The northern polar jet flows over the middle to northern latitudes of North America, Europe, and Asia and their intervening oceans, while the southern hemisphere polar jet mostly circles Antarctica. Jet streams may start, stop, split into two or more parts, combine into one stream, or flow in various directions including opposite to the direction of the remainder of the jet.

The El Niño–Southern Oscillation affects the location of the jet streams, which in turn affects the weather over the tropical Pacific Ocean and affects the climate of much of the tropics and subtropics, and can affect weather in higher-latitude regions. The term "jet stream" is also applied to some other winds at varying levels in the atmosphere, some global (such as the higher-level polar-night jet), some local (such as the African easterly jet). Meteorologists use the location of some of the jet streams as an aid in weather forecasting. Airlines use them to reduce some flight times and fuel consumption. Scientists have considered whether the jet streams might be harnessed for power generation. In World War II, the Japanese used the jet stream to carry Fu-Go balloon bombs across the Pacific Ocean to launch small attacks on North America.

Jet streams have been detected in the atmospheres of Venus, Jupiter, Saturn, Uranus, and Neptune.

== Discovery ==
The first indications of this phenomenon came from American professor Elias Loomis (1811–1889), when he proposed the hypothesis of a powerful air current in the upper air blowing west to east across the United States as an explanation for the behaviour of major storms. After the 1883 eruption of the Krakatoa volcano, weather watchers tracked and mapped the effects on the sky over several years. They labelled the phenomenon the "equatorial smoke stream". In the 1920s Japanese meteorologist Wasaburo Oishi detected the jet stream from a site near Mount Fuji. He tracked pilot balloons ("pibals"), used to measure wind speed and direction, as they rose in the air. Oishi's work largely went unnoticed outside Japan because it was published in Esperanto, though chronologically he has to be credited for the scientific discovery of jet streams. American pilot Wiley Post (1898–1935), the first man to fly around the world solo in 1933, is often given some credit for discovery of jet streams. Post invented a pressurized suit that let him fly above 6,200 metres (20,300 ft). In the year before his death, Post made several attempts at a high-altitude transcontinental flight, and noticed that at times his ground speed greatly exceeded his air speed.

German meteorologist Heinrich Seilkopf is credited with coining a special term, Strahlströmung (literally "jet current"), for the phenomenon in 1939. Many sources credit real understanding of the nature of jet streams to regular and repeated flight-path traversals during World War II. Flyers consistently noticed westerly tailwinds in excess of 160 km/h (100 mph) in flights, for example, from the US to the UK. Similarly in 1944 a team of American meteorologists in Guam, including Reid Bryson, had enough observations to forecast very high west winds that would slow bombers raiding Japan.

== Description ==
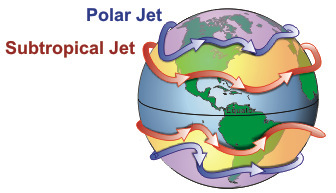
General configuration of the polar and subtropical jet streams

Cross section of the subtropical and polar jet streams by latitude

The polar and subtropical jet streams are the product of two factors: the atmospheric heating by solar radiation that produces the large-scale polar, Ferrel, and Hadley circulation cells, and the action of the Coriolis force acting on those moving masses. The Coriolis force is caused by the planet's rotation on its axis. The polar jet stream forms near the interface of the polar and Ferrel circulation cells; the subtropical jet forms near the boundary of the Ferrel and Hadley circulation cells.

Polar jet streams are typically located near the 250 hPa (about 1/4 atmosphere) pressure level, or 30,000 ft (5.7 mi; 9.1 km) above sea level while the weaker subtropical jet streams are somewhat higher.

The polar jets, at lower altitude, and often intruding into mid-latitudes, strongly affect weather and aviation. The polar jet stream is most commonly found between latitudes 30° and 60° (closer to 60°), while the subtropical jet streams are located close to latitude 30°. These two jets merge at some locations and times, while at other times they are well separated. The northern polar jet stream is said to "follow the sun" as it slowly migrates northward as that hemisphere warms, and southward again as it cools.

The width of a jet stream is typically a few hundred kilometres or miles and its vertical thickness often less than five kilometres (16,000 feet).

Jet streams are typically continuous over long distances, but discontinuities are also common. The path of the jet typically has a meandering shape, and these meanders themselves propagate eastward, at lower speeds than that of the actual wind within the flow. Further, the meanders can split or form eddies.

Each large meander, or wave, within the jet stream is known as a Rossby wave (planetary wave). Rossby waves are caused by changes in the Coriolis effect with latitude. Shortwave troughs, are smaller scale waves superimposed on the Rossby waves, with a scale of 1,000 to 4,000 kilometres (600–2,500 mi) long, that move along through the flow pattern around large scale, or longwave, "ridges" and "troughs" within Rossby waves.

The wind speeds are greatest where temperature differences between air masses are greatest, and often exceed 92 km/h (50 kn; 57 mph). Speeds of 400 km/h (220 kn; 250 mph) have been measured.

The jet stream moves from west to east bringing changes of weather. The path of jet streams affects cyclonic storm systems at lower levels in the atmosphere, and so knowledge of their course has become an important part of weather forecasting. For example, in 2007 and 2012, Britain experienced severe flooding as a result of the polar jet staying south for the summer.

The jet stream serves as an atmospheric boundary, separating the cold polar air from the warm subtropical air. Its instability is characterized by the winding of Rossby waves, which may lead to harsh winter weather; For example, in early 2026, extreme cold air erupted across North America, causing temperatures in areas such as Ontario to drop below −30 °C (−22 °F).

== Cause ==
Highly idealised depiction of the global circulation. The upper-level jets tend to flow latitudinally along the cell boundaries.

In general, winds are strongest immediately under the tropopause (except locally, during tornadoes, tropical cyclones or other anomalous situations). If two air masses of different temperatures or densities meet, the resulting pressure difference caused by the density difference (which ultimately causes wind) is highest within the transition zone. The wind does not flow directly from the hot to the cold area, but is deflected by the Coriolis effect and flows along the boundary of the two air masses.

All these facts are consequences of the thermal wind relation. The balance of forces acting on an atmospheric air parcel in the vertical direction is primarily between the gravitational force acting on the mass of the parcel and the buoyancy force, or the difference in pressure between the top and bottom surfaces of the parcel. Any imbalance between these forces results in the acceleration of the parcel in the imbalance direction: upward if the buoyant force exceeds the weight, and downward if the weight exceeds the buoyancy force. The balance in the vertical direction is referred to as hydrostatic. Beyond the tropics, the dominant forces act in the horizontal direction, and the primary struggle is between the Coriolis force and the pressure gradient force. Balance between these two forces is referred to as geostrophic. Given both hydrostatic and geostrophic balance, one can derive the thermal wind relation: the vertical gradient of the horizontal wind is proportional to the horizontal temperature gradient. If two air masses in the northern hemisphere, one cold and dense to the north and the other hot and less dense to the south, are separated by a vertical boundary and that boundary should be removed, the difference in densities will result in the cold air mass slipping under the hotter and less dense air mass. The Coriolis effect will then cause poleward-moving mass to deviate to the East, while equatorward-moving mass will deviate toward the west. The general trend in the atmosphere is for temperatures to decrease in the poleward direction. As a result, winds develop an eastward component and that component grows with altitude. Therefore, the strong eastward moving jet streams are in part a simple consequence of the fact that the Equator is warmer than the north and south poles.

=== Polar jet stream ===
The thermal wind relation does not explain why the winds are organized into tight jets, rather than distributed more broadly over the hemisphere. One factor that contributes to the creation of a concentrated polar jet is the undercutting of sub-tropical air masses by the more dense polar air masses at the polar front. This causes a sharp north–south pressure (south–north potential vorticity) gradient in the horizontal plane, an effect which is most significant during double Rossby wave breaking events. At high altitudes, lack of friction allows air to respond freely to the steep pressure gradient with low pressure at high altitude over the pole. This results in the formation of planetary wind circulations that experience a strong Coriolis deflection and thus can be considered 'quasi-geostrophic'. The polar front jet stream is closely linked to the frontogenesis process in midlatitudes, as the acceleration/deceleration of the air flow induces areas of low/high pressure respectively, which link to the formation of cyclones and anticyclones along the polar front in a relatively narrow region.

=== Subtropical jet ===
A second factor which contributes to a concentrated jet is more applicable to the subtropical jet which forms at the poleward limit of the tropical Hadley cell, and to first order this circulation is symmetric with respect to longitude. Tropical air rises to the tropopause, and moves poleward before sinking; this is the Hadley cell circulation. As it does so it tends to conserve angular momentum, since friction with the ground is slight. Air masses that begin moving poleward are deflected eastward by the Coriolis force (true for either hemisphere), which for poleward moving air implies an increased westerly component of the winds.

== Effects ==
=== Hurricane protection ===
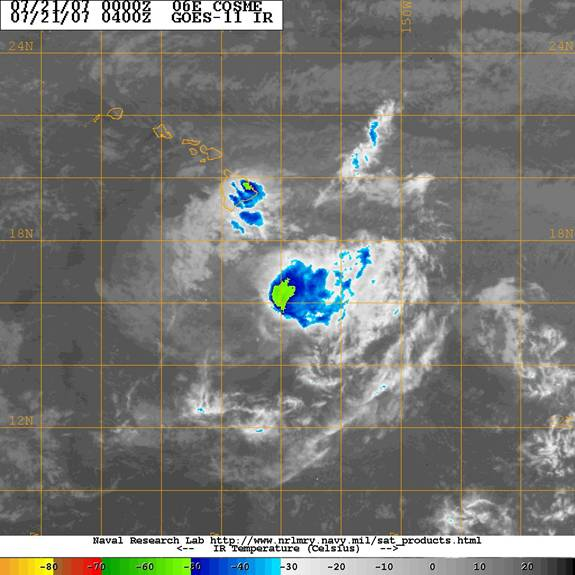
Hurricane Flossie over Hawaii in 2007. Note the large band of moisture that developed East of Hawaii Island that came from the hurricane.

The subtropical jet stream rounding the base of the mid-oceanic upper trough is thought to be one of the causes most of the Hawaiian Islands have been resistant to the long list of Hawaii hurricanes that have approached. For example, when Hurricane Flossie (2007) approached and dissipated just before reaching landfall, the U.S. National Oceanic and Atmospheric Administration (NOAA) cited vertical wind shear as evidenced in the photo.

== Uses ==
The northern polar jet stream is the most important one for aviation and weather forecasting, as it is much stronger and at a much lower altitude than the subtropical jet streams and also covers many countries in the northern hemisphere, while the southern polar jet stream mostly circles Antarctica and sometimes the southern tip of South America.

=== Aviation ===
Flights between Tokyo and Los Angeles using the jet stream eastbound and a great circle route westbound.

The location of the jet stream is important for aviation. Aircraft flight time can be dramatically affected by either flying with the flow or against it. Often, airlines work to fly with the jet stream to obtain significant fuel cost and time savings.

Commercial use of the jet stream began on 18 November 1952, when Pan Am flew from Tokyo to Honolulu at an altitude of 7,600 metres (24,900 ft). It cut the trip time by over one-third, from 18 to 11.5 hours.

Within North America, the time needed to fly east across the continent can be decreased by about 30 minutes if an airplane can fly with the jet stream. Across the Atlantic Ocean the North Atlantic Tracks service allows airlines and air traffic control to accommodate the jet stream for the benefit of airlines and other users.

Associated with jet streams is a phenomenon known as clear-air turbulence (CAT), caused by vertical and horizontal wind shear caused by jet streams. The CAT is strongest on the cold air side of the jet, next to and just under the axis of the jet. Clear-air turbulence can cause aircraft to plunge and so present a passenger safety hazard that has caused fatal accidents, such as the death of one passenger on United Airlines Flight 826 in 1997. Unusual wind speed in the jet stream in late February 2024 pushed commercial jets to excess of 800 mph (1,300 km/h; 700 kn) relative to the ground.

=== Possible future power generation ===
Scientists are investigating ways to harness the wind energy within the jet stream. According to one estimate of the potential wind energy in the jet stream, only one percent would be needed to meet the world's current energy needs. In the late 2000s it was estimated that the required technology would reportedly take 10–20 years to develop.

There are two major but divergent scientific articles about jet stream power. Archer & Caldeira claim that the Earth's jet streams could generate a total power of 1700 terawatts (TW) and that the climatic impact of harnessing this amount would be negligible. However, Miller, Gans, & Kleidon claim that the jet streams could generate a total power of only 7.5 TW and lacks the potential to make a significant contribution to renewable energy.

=== Unpowered aerial attack ===
Near the end of World War II, from late 1944 until early 1945, the Japanese Fu-Go balloon bomb, a type of fire balloon, was designed as a cheap weapon intended to make use of the jet stream over the Pacific Ocean to reach the west coast of Canada and the United States. Relatively ineffective as weapons, they were used in one of the few attacks on North America during World War II, causing six deaths and a small amount of damage. American scientists studying the balloons thought the Japanese might be preparing a biological attack.

== Changes due to climate cycles ==
=== Effects of ENSO ===
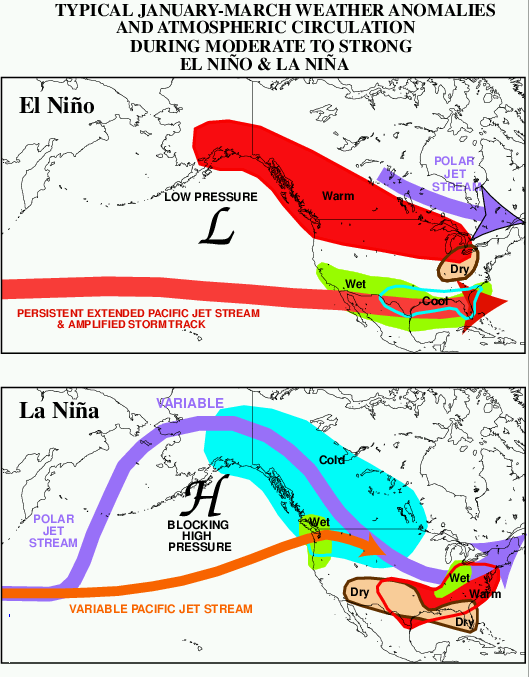
Impact of El Niño and La Niña on North America

El Niño–Southern Oscillation (ENSO) influences the average location of upper-level jet streams, and leads to cyclical variations in precipitation and temperature across North America, as well as affecting tropical cyclone development across the eastern Pacific and Atlantic basins. Combined with the Pacific Decadal Oscillation, ENSO can also impact cold season rainfall in Europe. Changes in ENSO also change the location of the jet stream over South America, which partially affects precipitation distribution over the continent.

==== El Niño ====
During El Niño events, increased precipitation is expected in California due to a more southerly, zonal, storm track. During the Niño portion of ENSO, increased precipitation falls along the Gulf coast and Southeast due to a stronger than normal, and more southerly, polar jet stream. Snowfall is greater than average across the southern Rockies and Sierra Nevada mountain range, and is well below normal across the Upper Midwest and Great Lakes states. The northern tier of the lower 48 exhibits above normal temperatures during the fall and winter, while the Gulf coast experiences below normal temperatures during the winter season. The subtropical jet stream across the deep tropics of the northern hemisphere is enhanced due to increased convection in the equatorial Pacific, which decreases tropical cyclogenesis within the Atlantic tropics below what is normal, and increases tropical cyclone activity across the eastern Pacific. In the southern hemisphere, the subtropical jet stream is displaced equatorward, or north, of its normal position, which diverts frontal systems and thunderstorm complexes from reaching central portions of the continent.

==== La Niña ====
Across North America during La Niña, increased precipitation is diverted into the Pacific Northwest due to a more northerly storm track and jet stream. The storm track shifts far enough northward to bring wetter than normal conditions (in the form of increased snowfall) to the Midwestern states, as well as hot and dry summers. Snowfall is above normal across the Pacific Northwest and western Great Lakes. Across the North Atlantic, the jet stream is stronger than normal, which directs stronger systems with increased precipitation towards Europe.

=== Dust Bowl ===
Evidence suggests the jet stream was at least partly responsible for the widespread drought conditions during the 1930s Dust Bowl in the Midwest United States. Normally, the jet stream flows east over the Gulf of Mexico and turns northward pulling up moisture and dumping rain onto the Great Plains. During the Dust Bowl, the jet stream weakened and changed course traveling farther south than normal. This starved the Great Plains and other areas of the Midwest of rainfall, causing extraordinary drought conditions.

== Longer-term climatic changes ==
Meanders (Rossby waves) of the Northern Hemisphere's polar jet stream developing (a), (b); then finally detaching a "drop" of cold air (c). Orange: warmer masses of air; pink: jet stream.

Since the early 2000s, climate models have consistently identified that global warming will gradually push jet streams poleward. In 2008, this was confirmed by observational evidence, which proved that from 1979 to 2001, the northern jet stream moved northward at an average rate of 2.01 kilometres (1.25 mi) per year, with a similar trend in the southern hemisphere jet stream. Climate scientists have hypothesized that the jet stream will also gradually weaken as a result of global warming. Trends such as Arctic sea ice decline, reduced snow cover, evapotranspiration patterns, and other weather anomalies have caused the Arctic to heat up faster than other parts of the globe, in what is known as the Arctic amplification. In 2021–2022, it was found that since 1979, the warming within the Arctic Circle has been nearly four times faster than the global average, and some hotspots in the Barents Sea area warmed up to seven times faster than the global average. While the Arctic remains one of the coldest places on Earth today, the temperature gradient between it and the warmer parts of the globe will continue to diminish with every decade of global warming as the result of this amplification. If this gradient has a strong influence on the jet stream, then it will eventually become weaker and more variable in its course, which would allow more cold air from the polar vortex to leak mid-latitudes and slow the progression of Rossby waves, leading to more persistent and more extreme weather.

The hypothesis above is closely associated with Jennifer Francis, who had first proposed it in a 2012 paper co-authored by Stephen J. Vavrus. While some paleoclimate reconstructions have suggested that the polar vortex becomes more variable and causes more unstable weather during periods of warming back in 1997, this was contradicted by climate modelling, with PMIP2 simulations finding in 2010 that the Arctic Oscillation (AO) was much weaker and more negative during the Last Glacial Maximum, and suggesting that warmer periods have stronger positive phase AO, and thus less frequent leaks of the polar vortex air. However, a 2012 review in the Journal of the Atmospheric Sciences noted that "there [has been] a significant change in the vortex mean state over the twenty-first century, resulting in a weaker, more disturbed vortex.", which contradicted the modelling results but fit the Francis-Vavrus hypothesis. Additionally, a 2013 study noted that the then-current CMIP5 tended to strongly underestimate winter blocking trends, and other 2012 research had suggested a connection between declining Arctic sea ice and heavy snowfall during midlatitude winters.

In 2013, further research from Francis connected reductions in the Arctic sea ice to extreme summer weather in the northern mid-latitudes, while other research from that year identified potential linkages between Arctic sea ice trends and more extreme rainfall in the European summer. At the time, it was also suggested that this connection between Arctic amplification and jet stream patterns was involved in the formation of Hurricane Sandy and played a role in the early 2014 North American cold wave. In 2015, Francis' next study concluded that highly amplified jet-stream patterns are occurring more frequently in the past two decades. Hence, continued heat-trapping emissions favour increased formation of extreme events caused by prolonged weather conditions.

Studies published in 2017 and 2018 identified stalling patterns of Rossby waves in the Northern Hemisphere jet stream as the culprit behind other almost stationary extreme weather events, such as the 2018 European heatwave, the 2003 European heat wave, 2010 Russian heat wave or the 2010 Pakistan floods, and suggested that these patterns were all connected to Arctic amplification. Further work from Francis and Vavrus that year suggested that amplified Arctic warming is observed as stronger in lower atmospheric areas because the expanding process of warmer air increases pressure levels which decreases poleward geopotential height gradients. As these gradients are the reason that cause west to east winds through the thermal wind relationship, declining speeds are usually found south of the areas with geopotential increases. In 2017, Francis explained her findings to the Scientific American: "A lot more water vapor is being transported northward by big swings in the jet stream. That's important because water vapor is a greenhouse gas just like carbon dioxide and methane. It traps heat in the atmosphere. That vapor also condenses as droplets we know as clouds, which themselves trap more heat. The vapor is a big part of the amplification story—a big reason the Arctic is warming faster than anywhere else."

In a 2017 study conducted by climatologist Judah Cohen and several of his research associates, Cohen wrote that "[the] shift in polar vortex states can account for most of the recent winter cooling trends over Eurasian midlatitudes". A 2018 paper from Vavrus and others linked Arctic amplification to more persistent hot-dry extremes during the midlatitude summers, as well as the midlatitude winter continental cooling. Another 2017 paper estimated that when the Arctic experiences anomalous warming, primary production in North America goes down by between 1% and 4% on average, with some states suffering up to 20% losses. A 2021 study found that a stratospheric polar vortex disruption is linked with extreme cold winter weather across parts of Asia and North America, including the February 2021 North American cold wave. Another 2021 study identified a connection between the Arctic sea ice loss and the increased size of wildfires in the Western United States.

However, because the specific observations are considered short-term observations, there is considerable uncertainty in the conclusions. Climatology observations require several decades to definitively distinguish various forms of natural variability from climate trends. This point was stressed by reviews in 2013 and in 2017. A study in 2014 concluded that Arctic amplification significantly decreased cold-season temperature variability over the northern hemisphere in recent decades. Cold Arctic air intrudes into the warmer lower latitudes more rapidly today during autumn and winter, a trend projected to continue in the future except during summer, thus calling into question whether winters will bring more cold extremes. A 2019 analysis of a data set collected from 35 182 weather stations worldwide, including 9116 whose records go beyond 50 years, found a sharp decrease in northern midlatitude cold waves since the 1980s.

Moreover, a range of long-term observational data collected during the 2010s and published in 2020 suggests that the intensification of Arctic amplification since the early 2010s was not linked to significant changes on mid-latitude atmospheric patterns. State-of-the-art modelling research of PAMIP (Polar Amplification Model Intercomparison Project) improved upon the 2010 findings of PMIP2; it found that sea ice decline would weaken the jet stream and increase the probability of atmospheric blocking, but the connection was very minor, and typically insignificant next to interannual variability. In 2022, a follow-up study found that while the PAMIP average had likely underestimated the weakening caused by sea ice decline by 1.2 to 3 times, even the corrected connection still amounts to only 10% of the jet stream's natural variability.

Additionally, a 2021 study found that while jet streams had indeed slowly moved polewards since 1960 as was predicted by models, they did not weaken, in spite of a small increase in waviness. A 2022 re-analysis of the aircraft observational data collected over 2002–2020 suggested that the North Atlantic jet stream had actually strengthened. Finally, a 2021 study was able to reconstruct jet stream patterns over the past 1,250 years based on Greenland ice cores, and found that all of the recently observed changes remain within range of natural variability: the earliest likely time of divergence is in 2060, under the Representative Concentration Pathway 8.5 which implies continually accelerating greenhouse gas emissions.

== Other upper-level jets ==
=== Polar night jet ===
The polar-night jet stream forms mainly during the winter months when the nights are much longer – hence the name referencing polar nights – in their respective hemispheres at around 60° latitude. The polar night jet moves at a greater height (about 24,000 metres (80,000 ft)) than it does during the summer. During these dark months the air high over the poles becomes much colder than the air over the Equator. This difference in temperature gives rise to extreme air pressure differences in the stratosphere which, when combined with the Coriolis effect, create the polar night jets, that race eastward at an altitude of about 48 kilometres (30 mi). The polar vortex is circled by the polar night jet. The warmer air can only move along the edge of the polar vortex, but not enter it. Within the vortex, the cold polar air becomes increasingly cold, due to a lack of warmer air from lower latitudes as well as a lack of energy from the Sun entering during the polar night.

== Low-level jets ==
There are wind maxima at lower levels of the atmosphere that are also referred to as jets.

=== Barrier jet ===
A barrier jet in the low levels forms just upstream of mountain chains, with the mountains forcing the jet to be oriented parallel to the mountains. The mountain barrier increases the strength of the low level wind by 45 percent. In the North American Great Plains a southerly low-level jet helps fuel overnight thunderstorm activity during the warm season, normally in the form of mesoscale convective systems which form during the overnight hours. A similar phenomenon develops across Australia, which pulls moisture poleward from the Coral Sea towards cut-off lows which form mainly across southwestern portions of the continent.

=== Coastal jet ===
Coastal low-level jets are related to a sharp contrast between high temperatures over land and lower temperatures over the sea and play an important role in coastal weather, giving rise to strong coast parallel winds. Most coastal jets are associated with the oceanic high-pressure systems and thermal low over land and are mainly located along cold eastern boundary marine currents, in upwelling regions offshore California, Peru–Chile, Benguela, Portugal, Canary and West Australia, and offshore Yemen–Oman.

=== Valley exit jet ===
A valley exit jet is a strong, down-valley, elevated air current that emerges above the intersection of the valley and its adjacent plain. These winds frequently reach speeds of up to 20 m/s (72 km/h; 45 mph) at heights of 40–200 m (130–660 ft) above the ground. Surface winds below the jet tend to be substantially weaker, even when they are strong enough to sway vegetation.

Valley exit jets are likely to be found in valley regions that exhibit diurnal mountain wind systems, such as those of the dry mountain ranges of the US. Deep valleys that terminate abruptly at a plain are more impacted by these factors than are those that gradually become shallower as downvalley distance increases.

=== Africa ===
There are several important low-level jets in Africa. Numerous low-level jets form in the Sahara, and are important for the raising of dust off the desert surface. This includes a low-level jet in Chad, which is responsible for dust emission from the Bodélé Depression, the world's most important single source of dust emission. The Somali Jet, which forms off the East African coast is an important component of the global Hadley circulation, and supplies water vapour to the Asian Monsoon. Easterly low-level jets forming in valleys within the East African Rift System help account for the low rainfall in East Africa and support high rainfall in the Congo Basin rainforest. The formation of the thermal low over northern Africa leads to a low-level westerly jet stream from June into October, which provides the moist inflow to the West African monsoon.

While not technically a low-level jet, the mid-level African easterly jet (at 3000–4000 m above the surface) is also an important climate feature in Africa. It occurs during the northern hemisphere summer between 10°N and 20°N above in the Sahel region of West Africa. It is considered to play a crucial role in the West African monsoon, and helps form the tropical waves which move across the tropical Atlantic and eastern Pacific oceans during the warm season.

== Other planets ==
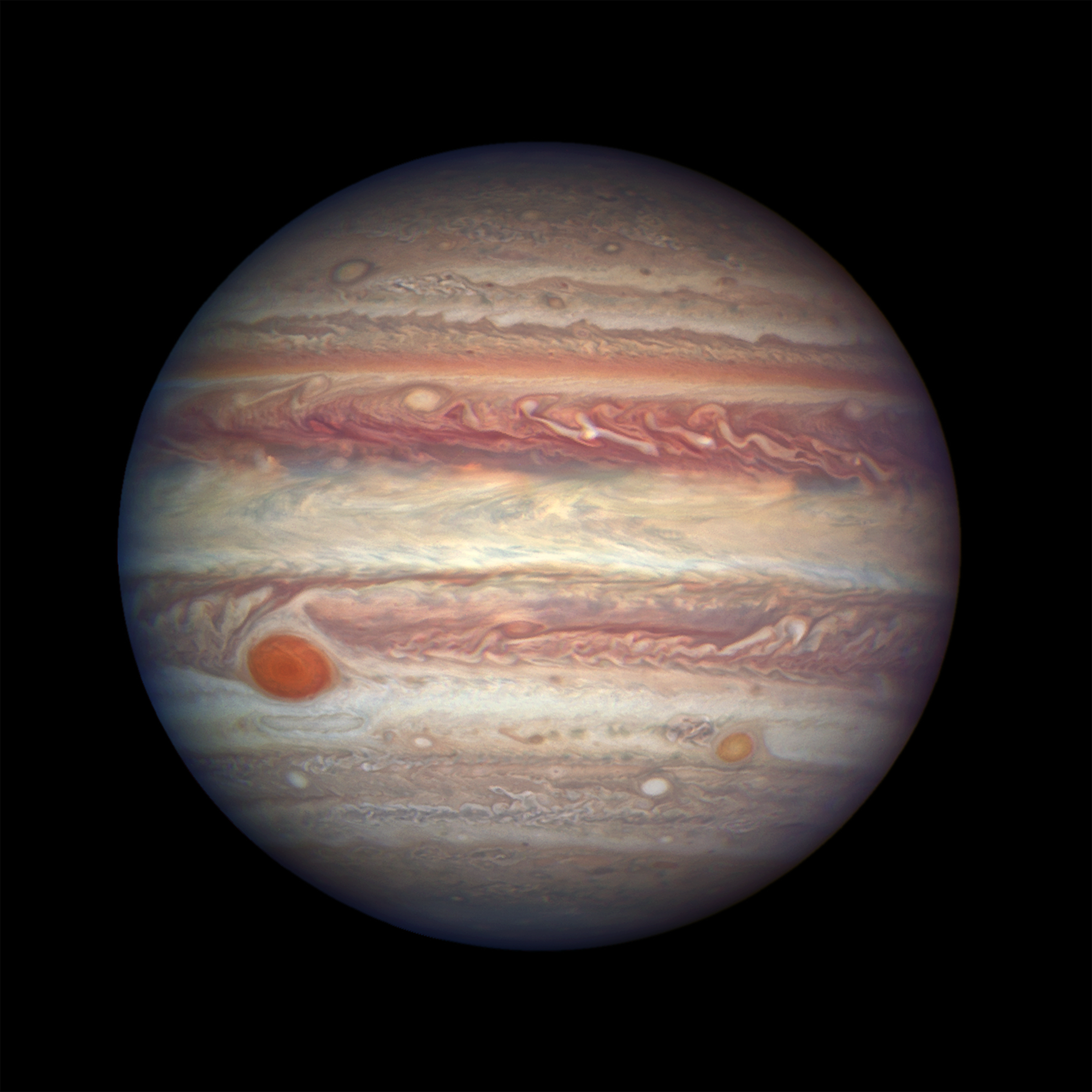
Jupiter's distinctive cloud bands

For other planets, internal heat rather than solar heating is believed to drive their jet streams. Jupiter's atmosphere has multiple jet streams caused by the convection cells driven by internal heating. These form the familiar banded color structure.

== See also ==
- Atmospheric river
- Block (meteorology)
- Polar vortex
- Sting jet
- Surface weather analysis
- Tornado
- Tropical Easterly Jet
- Weather
- Wind shear
