= Eastern Cape drought =

Ongoing drought in South Africa

The Eastern Cape region of South Africa experienced a severe multi-year drought from 2015 through early 2020. The drought was one of the worst in the region's history and led the South African government to declare the region a "disaster area" in October 2019. The drought was a recurrence of the 1992 Eastern Cape Drought, which had resulted from similar weather patterns.

== History ==
A local hydrologist, Gideon Groenewald, has stated that it could be the worst drought the area as experienced in one thousand years and has had serious negative socioeconomic impacts on the region. Heavy rains in 2019 were not enough to break the drought. Reasons cited for the severity of the drought include poor water management by local government, unpredictable rainfall patterns, and vandalism of local infrastructure. Areas of the Eastern Cape that overlap with the Karoo, such as the area around Graaff-Reinet, have been especially badly hit. The drought has caused projected financial losses of R6.4 billion in livestock production, with extensive livestock areas accounting for some 5,600 jobs. The drought started to take place at the same time as the Cape Town water crisis.

== See also ==
- 2018–21 Southern Africa drought
