= Somali Jet =

Wind system off the east coast of Africa

The Somali Jet, also known as the Findlater Jet, is a cross-equatorial wind system which forms off the eastern coast of Africa in the Indian Ocean. It is recognised as an important component of the Indian Monsoon and is a factor in the relatively low rainfall in East Africa. It contributes to the existence of the Somali Current – the only major upwelling system that occurs on a western boundary of an ocean.

== History ==
The Somali Jet was documented scientifically for the first time by Findlater in 1969 based on upper air data from the Maldives and Nairobi. In practice, the existence of the strong winds had long been known due to its effect on maritime trade. Piracy off the Somali Coast is thought to be limited by the strong winds, with most instances of piracy occurring when the Somali Jet is weak.

== Structure ==
The Somali Jet is a wind maximum (>12 metres per second (39 ft/s)) in the lowest 1.5 km of the atmosphere, capped above by a maritime temperature inversion. It forms across a relatively narrow band of longitudes. In the northern hemisphere summer (July-September), the jet presents as a southeasterly wind in the southeastern Indian Ocean, before recurving anticylonically to the northeast on crossing the equator, parallel to the East African coast. At this time of year, the strongest jet winds are the southwesterlies in the Arabian Sea. There is also a local maximum in the southeasterly winds off the northern tip of Madagascar.

In response to the annual cycle in insolation, the jet reverses direction in the southern hemisphere summer (December to February).

== See also ==
- Tropical Easterly Jet
- African easterly jet
