= Climate of South Africa =

Köppen climate classification of South Africa

The climate of South Africa is determined by South Africa's geographic situation between 22°S and 35°S (excluding the Prince Edward Islands), in the Southern Hemisphere's subtropical zone, and its location between two oceans, Atlantic and the Indian.

It has a greater variety of climates than most other countries in sub-Saharan Africa, and it has lower average temperatures than other countries within this range of latitude, like Australia, because much of the interior (central plateau or Highveld, including Johannesburg) of South Africa is at a higher elevation.

Winter temperatures may reach the freezing point at high altitude, but are at their most mild in coastal regions, particularly KwaZulu Natal Province and perhaps the Eastern Cape. Cold and warm coastal currents running north-west and north-east respectively account for the difference in climates between west and east coasts. The weather is also influenced by the El Niño–Southern Oscillation.

South Africa experiences a high degree of sunshine with rainfall about half of the global average, increasing from west to east, and with semi-desert regions in the north-west. While the Western Cape has a Mediterranean climate, most of the country experiences summer rain.

== Temperature ==
South Africa has typical weather for the Southern Hemisphere, with the coldest days in June–August. On the central plateau, which includes the Free State and Gauteng provinces, the altitude keeps the average temperatures below 20 °C (68 °F); Johannesburg, for example, lies at 1,753 metres (5,751 ft). In winter temperatures can drop below freezing, also due to altitude. During winter it is warmest in the coastal regions, especially on the eastern Indian Ocean coast.

Warm season weather is influenced by the El Niño–Southern Oscillation (ENSO). South Africa experiences hotter weather and the summer rainfall regions are drier during the El Niño phase, while La Niña brings cooler and wetter conditions.

Average temperatures (°C) in South Africa
City	Summer; (January)		Winter; (July)	
City	Max	Min	Max	Min
Bloemfontein	29	15	15	–2
Cape Town	26	16	16	7
Durban	28	21	23	11
East London	26	18	19	10
George	25	15	15	7
Johannesburg	26	15	17	4
Kimberley	33	18	19	3
Mthatha	27	16	21	4
Musina	34	21	25	7
Nelspruit	29	19	23	6
Pietermaritzburg	28	18	23	3
Polokwane	28	17	20	4
Gqeberha	25	18	20	9
Pretoria	29	18	18	5
Richards Bay	29	21	23	12
Skukuza	33	21	26	6
Thohoyandou	31	20	24	10
Upington	36	20	21	4

Average temperatures (°F) in South Africa
City	Summer; (January)		Winter; (July)	
City	Max	Min	Max	Min
Bloemfontein	87.8	59	62.6	28.4
Cape Town	78.8	60.8	64.4	44.6
Durban	82.4	69.8	73.4	51.8
East London	78.8	64.4	69.8	50
George	77	59	66.2	44.6
Johannesburg	78.8	59	68	39.2
Kimberley	91.4	64.4	66.2	37.4
Mthatha	80.6	60.8	69.8	39.2
Musina	93.2	69.8	77	44.6
Nelspruit	84.2	66.2	73.4	42.8
Pietermaritzburg	82.4	64.4	73.4	37.4
Polokwane	82.4	62.6	68	39.2
Gqeberha	77	64.4	68	48.2
Pretoria	84.2	64.4	75.2	41
Richards Bay	84.2	69.8	73.4	53.6
Skukuza	91.4	69.8	78.8	42.8
Thohoyandou	87.8	68	75.2	50
Upington	96.8	68	69.8	39.2

== Precipitation ==
South Africa is a sunny country, averaging 8–10 daily sunshine hours in most regions. The average annual rainfall for South Africa is about 464 mm (compared to a global average of 950 mm) but large and unpredictable variations are common. Overall, rainfall is greatest in the east and gradually decreases westward, with some semi-desert areas along the western edge of South Africa. For most of the country, rain falls mainly in the summer months with brief afternoon thunderstorms. The exception is the Western Cape and its capital city Cape Town, where the climate is Mediterranean. In the winter months, snow collects on the high mountains of the Cape and the Drakensberg. A few times in South Africa's history snow has fallen in other regions - (provinces) such as in September 2024.

== Oceans ==
South Africa's coasts are major tourist attractions and trade locations. This makes the ocean important to South Africa and its citizens. The Indian and Atlantic oceans meet at the southwestern tip of South Africa. The warm Agulhas Current runs south along the east coast and the cold Benguela Current flows north along the western shore. As a result, there is at least a 6 °C difference in the annual temperatures of Durban (on the east) and Port Nolloth (on the west) despite being located at roughly the same latitude. With several other parts on the interior not receiving an adequate amount of rainfall and thus prone to droughts.

== Climatic zones ==
Arid (desert) Steppe (veld), summer rainfall Subtropical, winter rain, dry summer Subtropical, winter and summer rain Temperate, summer rainfall Temperate, (cold)

Climatic zones are often referred to by the seasonal pattern of rainfall. The winter rainfall region is confined to a relatively small area in the south-west, the Western Cape area, where gentle rain falls from May to August but the summers are dry. The summer rainfall region is the largest, being most of the country north of the coastal areas and the north west arid desert. Rain falls from October to February and is often heavy, with the amount of precipitation increasing from west to east. The summer and winter rainfall region is the Eastern Cape. The arid regions are in the north-west, with the driest areas being the north-west coast. Vegetation tends to vary by climatic zone and these also correspond to the horticultural zones.

The Highveld is the eastern plateau area of South Africa. It is typified by Johannesburg, at an elevation of 1,753 metres (5,751 ft). The former central business district is found on the south side of the prominent ridge called the Witwatersrand and the terrain falls to the north and south. By and large the Witwatersrand marks the watershed between the Limpopo and Vaal Rivers. The north and west of the city has undulating hills while the eastern parts are flatter.

Johannesburg enjoys a dry, sunny climate, with the exception of occasional late afternoon downpours in the summer months of October to April. Temperatures in the city are usually fairly mild due to the city's high altitude, with the average maximum daytime temperature in January of 26 °C (78.8 °F), dropping to an average maximum of around 16 °C (60.8 °F) in June. Winter is the sunniest time of the year, with cool days and cold nights. The temperature occasionally drops to below freezing at night, causing frost. Snow is a rare occurrence, with snowfall having been experienced in May 1956, August 1962, June 1964, September 1981, August 2006 (light), on 27 June 2007, accumulating up to 10 centimetres (3.9 in) in the southern suburbs, on 7 August 2012, and most recently on 10 July 2023. Regular cold fronts pass over in winter bringing very cold southerly winds but usually clear skies. The annual average rainfall is 713 millimetres (28.1 in), which is mostly concentrated in the summer months. Infrequent showers occur through the course of the winter months.

The Western Cape province has a Mediterranean climate with warm to hot, dry, sunny summer weather and mild, rainy conditions in winter.

The Prince Edward Islands are located in the Southern Indian Ocean Islands tundra ecoregion.

== Climate change ==
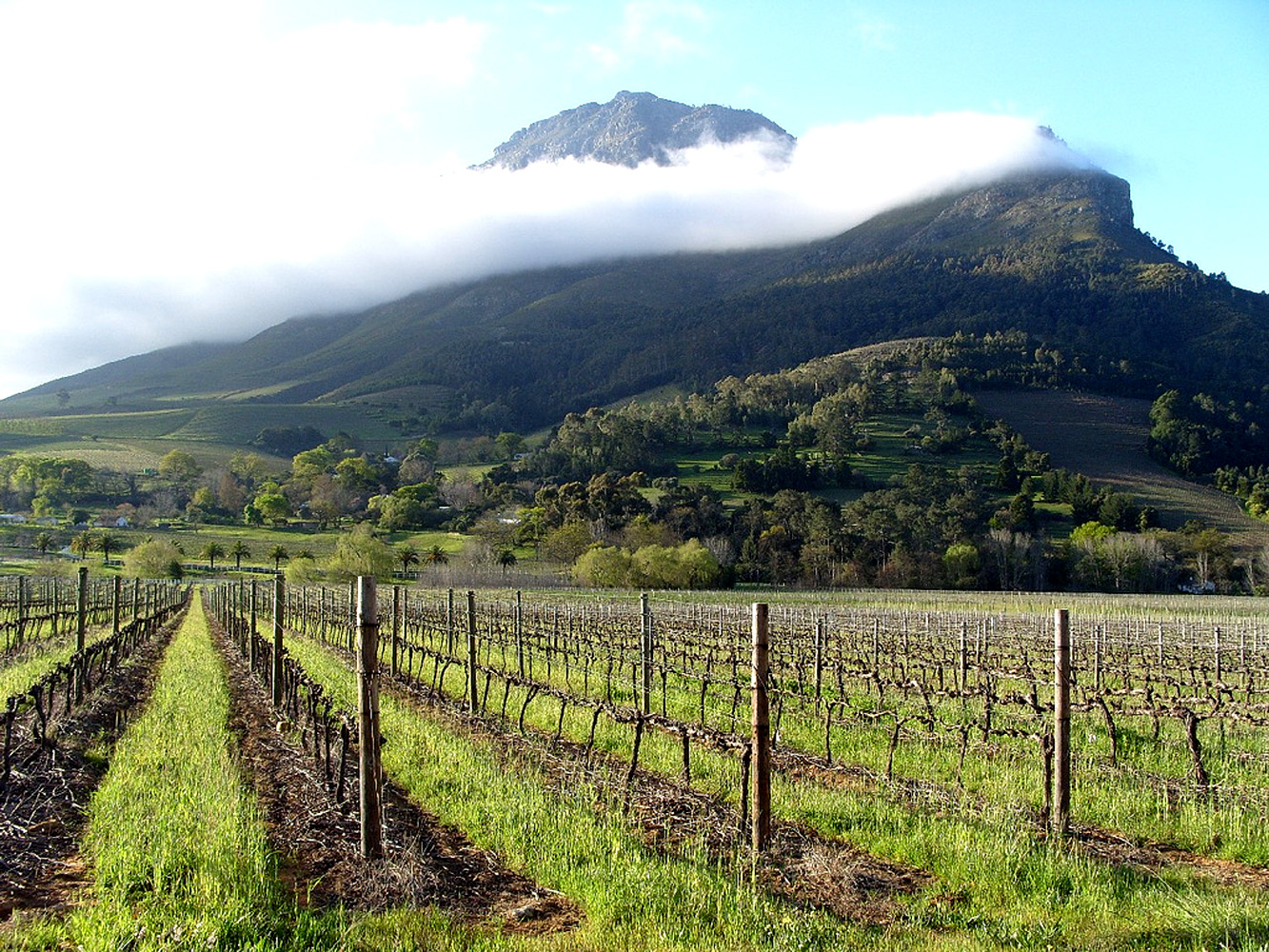
Climate change will impact agriculture in South Africa (trellised vines in Stellenbosch).

Climate change in South Africa is leading to increased temperatures and rainfall variability. Evidence shows that extreme weather events are becoming more prominent due to climate change. This is a critical concern for South Africans as climate change will affect the overall status and wellbeing of the country, for example with regard to water resources. Just like many other parts of the world, climate research showed that the real challenge in South Africa was more related to environmental issues rather than developmental ones. The most severe effect will be targeting the water supply, which has huge effects on the agriculture sector. Speedy environmental changes are resulting in clear effects on the community and environmental level in different ways and aspects, starting with air quality, to temperature and weather patterns, reaching out to food security and disease burden.

The various effects of climate change on rural communities are expected to include: drought, depletion of water resources and biodiversity, soil erosion, decreased subsistence economies and cessation of cultural activities.

South Africa contributes considerable CO_{2} emissions, being the 14th largest emitter of CO_{2}. Above the global average, South Africa had 9.5 tons of CO_{2} emissions per capita in 2015. This is in large part due to its energy system relying heavily on coal and oil. As part of its international commitments, South Africa has pledged to peak emissions between 2020 and 2025.

== See also ==
- Effects of global warming
- Cape Town water crisis
- 2018–19 Southern Africa drought
- Main features of climate

== Sources ==
- "Geography and mate". About SA. South African Government. 2016.
- "Land and its people: Climate" (PDF). South Africa Yearbook 2014/15. South African Government. 2016.
- "Rainfall Regions in South Africa" (PDF). Grade 5 Geography. Archived from the original (PDF) on 13 October 2018.
- "PlantZAfrica". SANBI.
