= Tropical Easterly Jet =

Jet stream

The Tropical Easterly Jet (jet stream) is the meteorological term referring to an upper level easterly wind that forms in late June and continues until early September. This strong flow of air that develops in the upper atmosphere during the Asian monsoon is centred on 15°N, 50-80°E and extends from South-East Asia to Africa.

A much weaker easterly jet exists in the northeast Pacific associated with the North American Monsoon.

== Meteorology ==
The strongest development of the jet is at about 15 kilometres (9 mi) above the Earth's surface with wind speeds of up to 40 metres per second (140 km/h; 89 mph; 78 kn) over the Indian Ocean. This jet subsides at the Somalia coast with the Mascarene High, and in the Sahara Desert. It has been suggested that the subsidence in the northwestern quadrant of the Tropical Easterly Jet is an important factor producing the exceptional hyperaridity of the Sahara – drier than any other desert outside of coastal upwelling zones.

The easterly jet induces significant vertical wind shear during the monsoonal months, especially from July to September, which suppresses any tropical cyclone activity. (Note: Monsoonal depressions, characteristic of the monsoon season in India, generally do not intensify into cyclones)

== History of study ==
Although the upper-level easterly wind flow over India during the summer monsoon was established as early as the 1930s, the term "easterly jet" originated with Indian researcher P.R. Krishna Rao in 1952. P. Koteswaram later in the 1950s demonstrated that the easterly flow is a jet stream in the strict sense of the term. During the 1960s and 1970s it became recognised that the Tropical Easterly Jet arises due to the intense solar heating of the Tibetan Plateau, and that it was closely linked to the Asian monsoon in both day-to-day fluctuations and overall seasonal strength.

== Relationship with Asian monsoon ==
The Tropical Easterly Jet's outflow from the Tibetan Plateau is deeply connected to the low-level monsoonal flow over India. Studies have demonstrated that when the high-level easterly jet is weak, monsoonal rainfall over India and seasonal rainfall as far east as Micronesia will be deficient.

It has been more recently suggested that variations in surface rainfall can actually drive variations in the strength of the jet, contradicting earlier suggestions that the surface southwesterly monsoon flow is actually a return flow from the upper-level easterlies.

== Recent weakening ==
Since 1950, the Tropical Easterly Jet has weakened by as much as 25 percent, so that the contour of 30 metres per second (110 km/h; 67 mph; 58 kn) has disappeared. This trend has been attributed to a combination of low-level global warming with cooling near the tropopause over continental Asia. Other studies show that the greatest weakening has occurred in the highest-altitude parts of the jet, and in the westerly section over the Arabian Sea. The declining strength of the Tropical Easterly Jet has been tightly linked with declining rainfall over Arunachal Pradesh, Jammu and Kashmir and certain parts of central India and the Malabar Coast. Further weakenings of the jet are expected under enhanced greenhouse gases – by at least 11 percent at the end of the twenty-first century.

The northeastern Pacific easterly jet, however, is expected to weaken by as much as 77 percent under likely global warming scenarios, which could reduce annual rainfall over Central America and southern Mexico by as much as 1,000 millimetres or 40 inches.

== See also ==
- African easterly jet
- Somali Jet
