= African easterly jet =

Jetstream over West Africa

The African easterly jet is a region of the lower troposphere over West Africa where the seasonal mean wind speed is at a maximum and the wind is easterly. The temperature contrast between the Sahara Desert and the Gulf of Guinea causes the jet to form to the north of the monsoon trough. The jet's maximum wind speeds are at a height of 3 kilometres (1.9 mi). The jet moves northward from its south-most location in January, reaching its most northerly latitude in August. Its strongest winds are in September while it begins shifting back towards the equator. Within the easterly jet, tropical waves form. Convective complexes associated with these waves can form tropical cyclones. If the jet is south of its normal location during August and September, tropical cyclogenesis is suppressed. If desertification continues across Sub-Saharan Africa, the strength of the jet could increase, although tropical wave generation probably would decrease, which would decrease the number of tropical cyclones in the Atlantic basin. A Jet Stream is the physical mechanism of a teleconnection.

== Formation and characteristics ==
During January, the African easterly jet lies at 3,000 metres (9,800 ft) above sea level at five degrees north latitude. Winds within it increase in speed from 30 km/h (19 mph) in January to 40 km/h (25 mph) in March. Shifting northward in April to the seventh parallel, winds within the jet increase to 45 km/h (28 mph). By June, it shifts northward into northwest Africa.

From June into October, the thermal low over northern Africa leads to a low-level westerly jet stream to the south of the Intertropical Convergence Zone. The mid-level African easterly jet develops because heating of the West African land mass during this time of year creates a surface temperature and moisture gradient between the Gulf of Guinea and the Sahara Desert. The atmosphere responds by generating vertical wind shear to maintain thermal wind balance. The jet reaches its zenith in August, lying between the 16th and 17th parallels. In September, winds maximize near 50 km/h (31 mph) between the 12th and 13th parallels. The easterly jet weakens and drops southward during October and November.

== Impact ==
The mid-level African easterly jet is considered to play a crucial role in the West African monsoon, and helps form the tropical waves that move across the tropical Atlantic and eastern Pacific oceans during the warm season. The jet exhibits both barotropic and baroclinic instability, which produces synoptic scale, westward-propagating disturbances in the jet known as African easterly waves or tropical waves. These instabilities, particularly in the presence of moist-convection, cause intense lower-layer cyclonic vortices at the northern flank of the jet.

A small number of mesoscale storm systems embedded in these waves develop into tropical cyclones after they move from west Africa into the tropical Atlantic, mainly during August and September. When the jet is south of normal during the peak months of the Atlantic hurricane season, tropical cyclone formation is suppressed.

== See also ==
- Saharan Air Layer
- Tropical Easterly Jet
- Somali Jet
