= List of Mandé peoples of Africa =

List of Mandé speaking ethnic groups in Africa

This is a list of Mandé peoples of Africa.

The predominant countries of each group's residence are shown in bold and are italicised.

- Manding (whose languages are in the Manding languages group of Mande)
  - Bambara people (**Mali,** Burkina Faso, Senegal, Niger)
  - Bozo people (**Mali**)
  - Dyula people (**Mali, Burkina Faso, Côte d'Ivoire**, Ghana, Guinea)
  - Mandinka people (**Mali,** Guinea, Senegal, Guinea-Bissau, Sierra Leone, The Gambia)
  - Mandingo people (**Sierra Leone**, Guinea, Liberia)
  - Susu people (**Guinea**, Sierra Leone)
  - Yalunka people (**Guinea**, Sierra Leone, Senegal, Mali)
- Bafour people (**Senegal**, Mali) (Extinct: ancestors of present day Soninke and other Mandé groups)
- Banka people (**Mali**)
- Beng people (**Côte d'Ivoire**)
- Bissa people (**Burkina Faso**, Ghana, Togo)
- Bobo people (**Burkina Faso**, Mali)
- Boko people (**Benin**, Nigeria)
- Busa people (**Nigeria**)
- Duun people (**Mali**, Burkina Faso)
- Gban people (**Côte d'Ivoire**)
- Gbandi people (**Liberia**, Guinea)
- Gio people (**Côte d'Ivoire**, Liberia)
- Goo people (**Côte d'Ivoire**)
- Guro people (**Côte d'Ivoire**)
- Jakhanke people (**Guinea**, Senegal, The Gambia, Mali)
- Jeri people (**Côte d'Ivoire**, Burkina Faso)
- Jowulu people (**Mali**)
- Kakabe people (**Guinea**)
- Kissi people (**Guinea**, Liberia, Sierra Leone)
- Kono people (**Sierra Leone**)
- Kpee people (**Burkina Faso**)
- Kpelle people (**Sierra Leone**, Liberia)
- Kuranko people (**Sierra Leone**, Guinea)
- Kyenga people (**Nigeria**, Benin)
- Lele people (**Guinea**)
- Ligbi people (**Ghana**)
- Loko people (**Sierra Leone**)
- Loma people (**Guinea**, Liberia)
- Mano people (**Liberia**)
- Mende people (**Sierra Leone**, Liberia)
- Mikhifore people (**Guinea**)
- Mwan people (**Côte d'Ivoire**)
- Samo people (**Burkina Faso**)
- Seenku people (**Burkina Faso**)
- Shangawa people(**Nigeria**)
- Soninke people (**Mali, Mauritania, Senegal**, Gambia, Guinea, Côte d'Ivoire, Ghana)
- Soninke Wangara (**Mali**, Burkina Faso, Côte d'Ivoire, Ghana) (Extinct: sub-group of the Soninke)
- Tura people (**Côte d'Ivoire**)
- Vai people (**Liberia**, Sierra Leone)
- Wan people (**Côte d'Ivoire**)
- Yaure people (**Côte d'Ivoire**)
- Zialo people (**Guinea**)
