= Southern Mande languages =

Southern Mande
- Southeastern Mande
- Geographic distribution: Ivory Coast, Liberia
- Linguistic classification: Niger–Congo?: Mande; Southeastern Mande; Southern Mande
- Subdivisions: Mano–Dan; Nwa–Beng

Language codes
- Glottolog: sout3140

The Southern Mande languages (called 'Southeastern Mande' in Kastenholz, who calls the superior Southeastern Mande node 'Eastern') are a branch of the Mande languages spoken across Ivory Coast and into Liberia.

== Classification ==
The following internal classification is from Dwyer (1989, 1996), as summarized in Williamson & Blench 2000.

- Southern Mande
  - Mano–Dan
    - Mano
    - Guro–Dan
      - Dan–Goo–Tura
      - Guro–Yaure
  - Nwa–Beng
    - Mwa–Wan
    - Gban–Beng

Vydrin (2009) places Mwan with Guro-Yaure.

There is also an extinct Gbin language. Paperno classifies Gbin and Beng as two primary branches of Southern Mande.

== See also ==
- Proto-South Mande reconstructions (Wiktionary)
