= List of stateless societies =

This is a non-exhaustive list of societies that have been described as examples of stateless societies.

There is no universally accepted definition of what constitutes a state, or to what extent a stateless group must be independent of the de jure or de facto control of states so as to be considered a society by itself.

== Historical societies ==
The following groups have been cited as examples of stateless societies by some commentators. But the classification of these societies as truly "stateless" is controversial.

Society	Period	Notes	Ref.
Essenes	2nd century BCE – 1st century CE	Mystic Jewish sect with communal living practices.	
Frisian freedom	800–1523	Territory notably not run under the feudal practices normal in Europe at the time.	
Taborites	1420–1452	Hussite faction which maintained an independent Tábor. Arguably a prototypical anarcho-communist society.	
Republic of Cospaia	1440–1826	Microstate created by historical anomaly, independent of bordering major powers. This territory lacked many state-like apparatuses.	

== Indigenous societies ==
Human society predates the existence of states, meaning that the history of almost any ethnic group would include pre-state organisation. The groups listed below have been identified as examples of stateless societies by various commentators, including discussions relating to anarchism.

Society	Provisioning system	Homeland	Ref.
Aboriginal Australians	Various	Australia	
Imazighen	Agricultural	Maghreb	
Andamanese	Hunter-gatherer	Andaman Islands	
Anga	Horticultural	Jos Plateau	
Anuak	Horticultural	Anuak Zone, Gambela	
Bassa	Subsistence agriculture	Bassaland	
Berom	Subsistence agriculture	Jos Plateau	
Birifor		Volta	
Bobo	Subsistence agriculture	Bobo-Dioulasso	
Croatan	Subsistence agriculture	Croatan Sound	
Dan	Agricultural	Man	
Dayak	Agricultural	Borneo	
Dogon	Subsistence agriculture	Dogon country	
Ekoi	Horticultural	Ekoi land	
Gagu	Pastoral agriculture		
Grebo		Grebo land	
Hopi	Agricultural	Hopi Nation	
Ibibio	Horticultural	Akwa Ibom	
Idoma	Hunter-gatherer	Benue	
Ifugao	Horticultural	Ifugao	
Igbo	Horticultural	Igboland	
Ijaw	Horticultural	Niger Delta	
Inuit	Hunter-gatherer	Arctic	
Kissi	Subsistence agriculture	Guinea Highlands	
Konkomba	Horticultural	Northern Ghana	
Kru	Fishing	Grand Kru County	
Kusasi		Kasaug Traditional Area	
Lugbara	Subsistence agriculture	West Nile	
Mamprusi		East Mamprusi	
Mano	Horticultural	Nimba County	
Mapuche	Pastoral agriculture	Araucanía	
Maragoli		Vihiga County	
Mbuti	Hunter-gatherer	Ituri Rainforest	
Niitsitapi	Hunter-gatherer	Blackfeet Nation	
Nubian	Agricultural	Nubia	
Nuer	Pastoralism	Nuer Zone, Gambela	
Pequot	Agricultural	Eastern Pequot Tribal Nation	
Piaroa	Subsistence agriculture	Orinoco	
Puliklah	Hunter-gatherer	Yurok Indian Reservation	
Tallensi	Horticultural	Tallensi Traditional Area	
Plateau Tonga	Subsistence agriculture	Binga	
Quinnipiac	Hunter-gatherer	Quinnipiac River	
Sami	Pastoralism	Sápmi	
San	Hunter-gatherer	Central Kalahari	
Santals	Agricultural	Jharkhand	
Semai	Subsistence agriculture	Perak	
Seminoles	Hunter-gatherer	Seminole Nation	
Shona	Subsistence agriculture	Mashonaland	
Tiv	Horticultural	Tivland	
Urhbo	Subsistence agriculture	Niger Delta	
Zomia			

== See also ==
- Stateless society
- Stateless nation
- Statelessness
