= Bobo Fing =

Bobo Fing or Black Bobo may refer to:

- Bobo Fing people
- Bobo Fing language
