= Tonjon language =

Extinct Mande language of Côte d'Ivoire

Tonjon
- Native to: Ivory Coast
- Region: Vallée du Bandama District
- Ethnicity: Djimini people
- Extinct: since the 1950s
- Language family: Niger–Congo: Mande; Western Mande; Central; Manding–Jogo; Jogo–Jeri; Jogo; Tonjon

Language codes
- ISO 639-3: tjn
- Glottolog: tonj1246
- Tonjon is classified as Extinct by the UNESCO Atlas of the World's Languages in Danger

Tonjon is an extinct Mande language once spoken by blacksmiths among the Djimini Senoufo of Ivory Coast. It was closely related to Ligbi, another blacksmith language.
