= Kpee language =

Mande language spoken in Ivory Coast

Kpee
- Numu
- Kpeego
- Native to: scattered throughout southwest Ivory Coast
- Ethnicity: Kpeera (Numu)
- Native speakers: ≈ 2,000 (2012)
- Language family: Niger–Congo: Mande; Western Mande; Central; Manding–Jogo; Jogo–Jeri; Jogo; Kpee

Language codes
- ISO 639-3: cpo
- Glottolog: kpee1234

- Person: Kpee
- People: Kpeera
- Language: Kpeego

The Kpee language, Kpeego, commonly called Numu (Noumoukan), is a Mande language spoken by blacksmiths (numu) in Burkina Faso. It is thought to be similar to Ligbi in Ghana, but no comparison has been done.
