= Jogo languages =

Jogo-Jeri
- Numu
- Geographic distribution: Ivory Coast, Ghana, Burkina Faso
- Ethnicity: Numu
- Linguistic classification: Niger–Congo: Mande; Western Mande; Central; Manding–Jogo; Jogo-Jeri
- Subdivisions: Ligbi; Tonjon; Jeri

Language codes
- Glottolog: jogo1241

The Jɔgɔ-Jeri (Jogo-Jeri) or Numu languages form a branch of the Western Mande languages, divided into two branches containing four total languages.

- Jogo
  - Ligbi (Ghana)
  - Tonjon (Ivory Coast, extinct)
- Jeri
  - Jalkunan (Burkina Faso)
  - Jeli/Jeri Kuo (Ivory Coast)

Kpee of Burkina Faso is similar to Ligbi, but no comparison has been done.
