= Gagu =

Gagu may refer to:

- Gagu people, a Mandé ethnic group of Côte d'Ivoire
- Gagu language, the Niger–Congo language they speak
- Gagu River of Romania
- Gagu, a village in Dascălu Commune, Ilfov County, Romania
