= Damah =

Damah may refer to:

- Dama, the Hindu concept of virtue, also spelt damah
- Damah Film Festival, a short film festival originating in Seattle and moving to Japan

== See also ==
- Dama (disambiguation)
