= Ram's horn (letter) =

Letter of the Latin alphabet

- Ɤ ɤ

Usage
- Writing system: Latin script
- Type: Alphabetic and logographic
- Sound values: [ɤ]
- In Unicode: U+A7CB, U+0264

Other
- Writing direction: Left-to-Right

Ram's horn (majuscule: Ɤ, minuscule: ɤ) is a letter of the extended Latin alphabet used in the International Phonetic Alphabet to transcribe a close-mid back unrounded vowel, and in the 2014 Eastern Dan orthography and the 2020 Goo orthography in Cote d'Ivoire.

== Usage ==
The International Phonetic Alphabet (IPA) uses the lowercase of the letter ram's horn:

- U+0264 ɤ LATIN SMALL LETTER RAMS HORN represents the close-mid back unrounded vowel.

In Cote d'Ivoire, the 2014 Eastern Dan orthography and the 2020 Goo orthography use both uppercase and lowercase of the letter ram's horn:

- U+0264 ɤ LATIN SMALL LETTER RAMS HORN
- U+A7CB Ɤ LATIN CAPITAL LETTER RAMS HORN

There is also a superscript form of the letter:

- U+10791 𐞑 MODIFIER LETTER SMALL RAMS HORN

== Origin ==
The letter has curves at its upper terminals, which were introduced in the 1989 Kiel Convention. The name "ram's horns" was also proposed at this convention and was adopted shortly thereafter. Prior to this, the letter that was used in the IPA had straight diagonal terminals ⟨⟩, similar to a small capital Latin letter gamma ⟨Ɣ⟩, and is thus often called baby gamma.

It has two origins:

- A capital letter of the English Phonotypic Alphabet ⟨⟩, which was used for the diphthong sound [aʊ], found in words such as owl or house. The EPA letter was originally (1843) visually very similar to the Greek-derived omicron–upsilon ligature ⟨ȣ⟩, though later (1847–1855) was straightened closer to Latin gamma.
- A small capital turned A ⟨⟩, which was the original form of the vowel letter in the IPA.

== Computer encoding ==
The lowercase letter has been in Unicode since version 1.1 in the IPA Extensions block, the modifier form since version 14.0 in the Latin Extended-F block, and the uppercase letter since version 16.0 in the Latin Extended-D block.

== See also ==
- Writing systems of Africa § Latin
