= Dama =

Dama or DAMA may refer to:

== Animals ==
- Dama gazelle (Nanger dama)
- Dama (genus) (fallow deer)
  - Fallow deer (Dama dama)
  - Persian fallow deer (Dama mesopotamica)
- Tammar wallaby or Dama wallaby (Macropus eugenii)

== Business, science and technology ==
- DAMA, abbreviation for "discharged against medical advice"
- Demand Assigned Multiple Access, a bandwidth allocation strategy
- DAMA/NaI, an experiment to detect dark matter
- DAMA/LIBRA, successor experiment to DAMA/NaI
- Data Management Association, also known as the Global Data Management Community (Dama International); see Data administration
- DAMA protocol ("Document, Assess, Monitor, Act"), a principle used in taxonomy, infectious disease, and parasitology

== Culture ==
- Dama, a name for Turkish draughts
- Dama, stage name of Rasolofondraosolo Zafimahaleo, founding member of the Madagascar folk-pop band Mahaleo
- Dama (Dune), a fictional character in Chapterhouse Dune (1985) by Frank Herbert
- Dama-fruit, a fictional fruit in Dorothy and the Wizard in Oz, which renders its eaters invisible
- D.A.M.A, a Portuguese band
- Chinese Dama, a group of middle-aged Chinese women who rushed to purchase gold as investment in 2013

== Geography ==
- Dama Chiefdom, a chiefdom in Sierra Leone
- Dama, Suwayda, a village in Suwayda Governorate, Syria
- Dama, Tongxiang, a town in Tongxiang, Zhejiang Province, China
- Dama in Casentino, little stone village "borgo" in Casentino, Tuscany, Italy

== Other uses ==
- Dama ceremony, a ceremony venerating the dead in the Dogon religion
- Dama, or temperance, a Hindu virtue of self-control and self-restraint

== See also ==
- Dama language (disambiguation)
- Dama y obrero (disambiguation)
