= Gbin language =

Extinct Mande language of Ivory Coast

Gbin
- Gbĩ
- Native to: Ivory Coast
- Region: Bondoukou
- Extinct: ca. 1900
- Language family: Niger–Congo?: Mande; Southeastern Mande; Southern Mande; (unclassified); Gbin

Language codes
- ISO 639-3: xgb
- Glottolog: gbin1239

Gbin (Gbĩ) is an extinct Mande language of Ivory Coast, neighboring but not closely related to Beng. The only significant attestation of Gbin is Delafosse (1904). Paperno describes Beng and Gbin as two primary branches of Southern Mande.
