= Dama language (Sierra Leone) =

Extinct language from Sierra Leone

Dama
- Native to: Sierra Leone
- Extinct: 1930s
- Language family: Niger–Congo ?: Mande ?; Western Mande ?; Central ?; Manding–Jogo ?; Manding–Vai ?; Vai–Kono ?; Dama

Language codes
- ISO 639-3: None (mis)
- Glottolog: dama1262

Dama is an extinct language of Sierra Leone. It was replaced by Mende. Based on a few remembered words and toponyms, Dalby (1963) believed it to be a Northern Mande language, similar to Kono and Vai, but Glottolog leaves it unclassified.
