= Soninke =

Soninke may refer to:

- Soninke people
- Soninke language
