= BXW =

BXW may refer to:

- Banana Xanthomonas wilt, a bacterial disease.
- Bankagooma (ISO 639-3 code BXW), a language native to Mali.
- Box Hill & Westhumble railway station (three letter code BXW), a station near Dorking, England.
