= Mixifore language =

Mande language spoken in Guinea

Mixifore
- Mogofin
- Native to: Guinea
- Native speakers: 20,000 (2012)
- Language family: Niger–Congo: Mande; Western Mande; Central–Western; Central Mande; Manding–Jogo; Manding–Vai; Manding–Mokole; Mokole; Mixifore

Language codes
- ISO 639-3: mfg
- Glottolog: mixi1241

Mixifore, or Mogofin, is a minor Mande language of Guinea. Mixiforé is a branch of Mandingos language spoken in the Boké region. It is a part of the group of Western Mandingos (Kassonko, Diakanke, and Mandekos), in which they migrated from Fouta Djallon under the Fulani's migration.

== Etymology ==
The term Mixiforé is a Susu term meaning "the black people". Upon the arrival of the Miguiforé, when the Susu saw they were extremely black, they started calling them by this name.

== History ==
Miguiforés migrated from the Labé region as well as Tougué's Préfecture. Their migration might be in the 19th century due to their involvement in the battle of Kansala. And after the Fulani's victory and seeing themselves under the Fulani's domination, they migrated to the coastal areas. The remaining are in their former area: Fatako, Botoko, Koin and others.
