= Bozo language =

Mande language spoken in West Africa

Bozo
- Region: Mali, Nigeria, Burkina Faso, Ivory Coast
- Ethnicity: Bozo people
- Native speakers: 230,000 (apart from Tieyaxo) in Mali (2003–2009)
- Language family: Mande: Western Mande; Northwestern; Soninke–Bobo; Soninke–Bozo; Bozo

Language codes
- ISO 639-3: Variously: bzx – Hainyaxo boo – Tiemacèwè boz – Tiéyaxo bze – Jenaama
- Glottolog: bozo1252

Bozo (Bambara: Boso, meaning 'house of straw') is a Mande language spoken by the Bozo people of the Inner Niger Delta in Mali. For the purpose of fishing, many Bozo also live in other West African countries where there are rivers and dams, such as Nigeria, Burkina Faso and Ivory Coast. According to the 2000 census, the Bozo people number about 132,100. Bozo is considered a dialect cluster, but there is a quite a bit of diversity. Ethnologue recognises four languages on the basis of requirements for literacy materials. Bozo is part of the northwestern branch of the Mande languages; the closest linguistic relative is Soninke, a major language spoken in the northwestern section of southern Mali, in eastern Senegal, and in southern Mauritania. The Bozo often speak one or more regional languages such as Bambara, Fula, or Western Songhay. The language is tonal, with three lexical tones.

The Bozo cluster is divided into the following varieties:

- Hainyaxo (Hainyaho, Kelengaxo, Kɛlɛngaxo) (a few thousand speakers), spoken in Mali
- Tiɛma Cɛwɛ (Tièma cièwè, Tièma cièwe, Tiema ciewe, Tiema cewe, Tiemacèwè, Tiemacewe, Tiema) (2,500 speakers in 1991), spoken in Mali
- Tiéyaxo (Tieyaxo, Tigemaxo) (a few thousand speakers), spoken in Mali and Burkina Faso
- Sorogaama (Jenaama, Sorogama, Sorko) (200,000 speakers in 2005), spoken in Mali, Nigeria and Ivory Coast

Hainyaxo (Kelengaxo), spoken by the Hain (sg. Xan), is the most western dialect, spoken in two spots along the Niger River. It is closely related to Tieyaxo (Tigemaxo), its eastern neighbour which is spoken around Diafarabé. The central and most widely spoken Bozo language is Jenaama (Sorogama), which actually consists of four dialects, Pondori (south of Mopti), Kotya, Korondugu (north of Mopti) and Debo (around Lake Debo). Tiemacewe (Tièma Cièwè) is the northeasternmostern Bozo dialect, spoken in the vicinity of Lake Debo.

== Nigeria ==
In Nigeria, the Jenaama/Sorogama dialect of the Bozo language is usually referred to as Sorko. It is spoken in the Nigerian states of Niger, Kebbi, and Kwara (Lake Kainji).

== Writing system ==
Bozo alphabet of DNAFLA
A	B	C	D	E	Ɛ	F	G	H	I	J	K	L	M	N	Ɲ	Ŋ	O	Ɔ	P	R	S	T	U	W	X	Y
a	b	c	d	e	ɛ	f	g	h	i	j	k	l	m	n	ɲ	ŋ	o	ɔ	p	r	s	t	u	w	x	y

A long vowel is indicated by doubling the letter: ⟨aa, ee, ɛɛ, ii, oo, ɔɔ, uu⟩; nasalization is indicated by following the letter with an n: ⟨an, en, ɛn, in, on, ɔn, un⟩.
