= Yalunka =

Yalunka may refer to:

- the Yalunka people
- the Yalunka language
