= Goo language =

Mande language of Ivory Coast

Goo
- gʋ̏ʋ̏
- Region: Ivory Coast
- Native speakers: 8,000 (2021)
- Language family: Niger–Congo: Mande; Eastern Mande; Southeastern; Mano–Dan; Guro–Dan; Tura–Dan; Goo

Language codes
- ISO 639-3: gov
- Glottolog: gooa1234

Goo is Mande language of Ivory Coast discovered in 2012 though possibly earlier. It is close to Dan and Tura, but intelligible with neither. It is spoken in 10 villages.
