= Soso–Jalonke languages =

Language branch

Soso–Jalonke
- Susu–Yalunka
- Geographic distribution: Guinea and environs
- Linguistic classification: Niger–Congo: Mande; Western Mande; Central; Soso–Jalonke
- Subdivisions: Susu; Yalunka

Language codes
- Glottolog: susu1249

The Soso–Jalonke languages (or Susu‑Yalunka), Susu and Yalunka, form a branch of the Mande languages Linguistic reconstruction suggests they are most closely related to the Southwestern Mande languages, including Mende and Kpelle. They are spoken in an area centered on Guinea.
