= Bozo people =

Mande ethnic group in Southern Mali

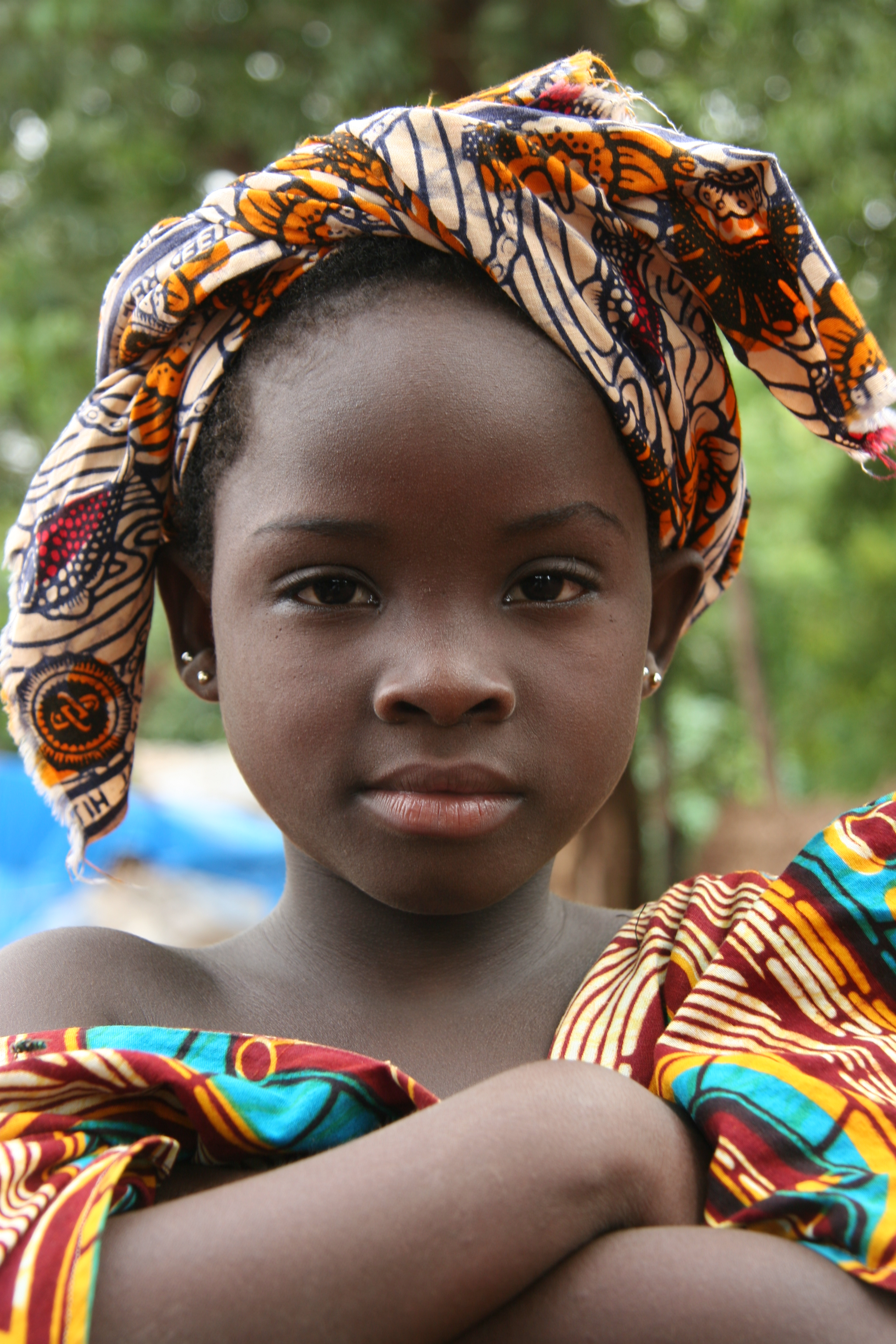
- A Bozo girl from Bamako, Mali

Total population
- 132,100

Regions with significant populations

Languages
- Bozo, French

Religion
- Islam

The Bozo (Bambara: ߓߏ߬ߛߏ, romanized: Boso) are a Mande ethnic group located predominantly along the Niger River in Mali. The name Bozo is thought to derive from Bambara ߓߐ߬ ߛߏ (bɔ-so, 'bamboo house'); the people accept it as referring to the whole of the ethnic group but use more specific clan names such as Sorogoye, Hain, and Tieye themselves. They are famous for their fishing and are occasionally referred to as the "masters of the river".

The Bozo language, which belongs to the Soninke-Bozo subgroup of Northwestern Mande, has traditionally been considered a single language though there are at least four distinct varieties.

Aspects of Bozo culture took shape under the 10th century Ghana Empire, when the Bozo took possession of the banks of the Niger. The Bozo were the founders of the Malian cities of Djenné and Mopti.

The Bozo are predominantly Muslim. They began to convert to Islam around the 14th century and were all Muslim by the 19th century. However, they preserve a number of animist traditions as well. Their animal totem is the bull, whose body represents the Niger and whose horns represent the Bozo fishing pirogues.

A 2000 census counted the Bozo population of Mali to be 132,100.

== Sources ==
- Ligers, Ziedonis (1964–1969). Les Sorko (Bozo), maîtres du Niger: étude ethnographique (four volumes). Paris: Librairie des Cinq Continents.
- in ISBN 3-570-19230-X: Geo Special Westafrika, Article: Sexualkunde am Fluss
