= Dan language =

Mande language of West Africa

Dan
- Yacouba
- dàn, ꞊daanwo, daã̀
- Native to: Ivory Coast, Guinea, and Liberia
- Ethnicity: Dan people
- Native speakers: 1.6 million (2012)
- Language family: Niger–Congo?: Mande; Eastern Mande; Southeastern; Mano–Dan; Guro–Dan; Tura–Dan; Dan
- Writing system: Latin

Language codes
- ISO 639-3: Either: dnj – Dan lda – Kla
- Glottolog: dann1241

A Dan speaker, recorded in Liberia.

Dan /ˈdæn/ is a Southern Mande language spoken primarily in Ivory Coast (~800,000 speakers) and Liberia (150,000–200,000 speakers). There is also a population of about 800 speakers in Guinea. Dan is a tonal language, with 9 to 11 contour and register tones, depending on the dialect.

Alternative names for the language include Yacouba or Yakubasa, Gio, Gyo, Gio-Dan, and Da. Dialects are Gio (Liberian Dan), Gweetaawu (Eastern Dan), Blowo (Western Dan), and Kla. Kla is evidently a distinct language.

== Phonology ==
A syllable is minimally /V/ or /ŋ/, and maximally /ClVV/ or /ClVŋ/.

=== Vowels ===
Vowels
	Front	Central		Back	
	Front	Unrd.	Rnd.	Unrd.	Rnd.
Close	i			ɯ	u
Near-close	ɪ			ɯ̽	ʊ
Close-mid	e		ɵ	ɤ	o
Mid		ə			
Open-mid	ɛ			ʌ	ɔ
Open	æ			ɑ	ɒ
Syllabic		ŋ̍			

Color coding:

Only in Eastern Dan when in the position of extra-high tone

Only in Liberian Dan

Nasal sounds in Eastern Dan
	Front	Back	
	Front	Unrd.	Rnd.
Close	ĩ	ɯ̃	ũ
Open-mid	ɛ̃	ʌ̃	ɔ̃
Open	æ̃	ɑ̃	ɒ̃

=== Consonants ===
Consonants
		Labial	Alveolar	Palatal	Velar		Labial- velar	Glottal
		Labial	Alveolar	Palatal	plain	lab.	Labial- velar	Glottal
Nasal		m (Note: Nasal consonant sounds mainly occur when phonemes /ɓ, ɗ, j, w, ɡ͡b/ are in nasal positions.)	n	ɲ	ŋ	ŋʷ	ɡ͡m	
Plosive	voiceless	p	t		k	kʷ	k͡p	
Plosive	voiced	b	d		ɡ	ɡʷ	ɡ͡b	
Implosive		ɓ	ɗ					
Fricative	voiceless	f	s		x			h
Fricative	voiced	v	z					
Approximant				j		w		
Lateral			l					
Trill			(r)					

Only in Liberian Dan

Not in Western Dan

Not in Liberian Dan

- all consonants are nasalized in nasal feet
- /ŋ/ occurs only as a syllable or a syllable coda and has been treated as a vowel. it carries tone.
- /l/ is heard as [r] when preceded by alveolar or palatal consonants.
- Consonant combinations /sl, zl/ are heard as lateral fricative sounds [ɬ, ɮ].

=== Tones ===
Dan has four to five level tones, depending on the variety, with level and contour tones.

== Writing system ==
The orthography of Liberia includes this alphabet:

Dan alphabet (Liberia)
A	B	Ɓ	D	Ɗ	E	Ɛ	F	G	GB	H	I	K	KP	KW	L	M	N	NW	NY	Ŋ	O	Ɔ	Ə	Ɵ	P	R	S	T	U	Ɥ	V	W	X	Y	Z
a	b	ɓ	d	ɗ	e	ɛ	f	g	gb	h	i	k	kp	kw	l	m	n	nw	ny	ŋ	o	ɔ	ə	ɵ	p	r	s	t	u	ɥ	v	w	x	y	z
IPA value
a	b	ɓ	d	ɗ	e	ɛ	f	ɡ	ɡ͡b	h	i	k	k͡p	kʷ	l	m	n	ŋʷ	ɲ	ŋ	o	ɔ	ə	ɵ	p	r	s	t	u	ɯ	v	w	x	j	z

Dan West alphabet (Côte d'Ivoire)
A	AƆ	B	BH	D	DH	E	Ɛ	Ë	ƐA	F	G	GB	GW	I	K	KP	KW	L	M	N	NG	O	Ɔ	Ö	P	R	S	T	U	Ü	V	W	Y	Z
a	aɔ	b	bh	d	dh	e	ɛ	ë	ɛa	f	g	gb	gw	i	k	kp	kw	l	m	n	ng	o	ɔ	ö	p	r	s	t	u	ü	v	w	y	z
IPA values
a	ɒ	b	ɓ	d	ɗ	e	ɛ	ʌ	æ	f	ɡ	ɡ͡b	gʷ	i	k	k͡p	kʷ	l	m	n	ŋ	o	ɔ	ɤ	p	r	s	t	u	ɯ	v	w	j	z

Dan East alphabet (Côte d'Ivoire), 1982
A	AƆ	B	BH	D	DH	E	Ë	Ɛ	ƐA	F	G	GB	GW	H	I	Ɩ	K	KP	KW	L	M	N	O	Ö	Ɔ	P	R	S	T	U	Ü	Ʋ	Ʋ̈	V	W	Y	Z
a	aɔ	b	bh	d	dh	e	ë	ɛ	ɛa	f	g	gb	gw	h	i	ɩ	k	kp	kw	l	m	n	o	ö	ɔ	p	r	s	t	u	ü	ʋ	ʋ̈	v	w	y	z
IPA value
a	ɒ	b	ɓ	d	ɗ	e	ʌ	ɛ	æ	f	ɡ	ɡ͡b	gʷ	h	i	ɪ	k	k͡p	kʷ	l	m	n	o	ɤ	ɔ	p	r	s	t	u	ɯ	ʊ	ʉ	v	w	j	z

Dan East alphabet (Côte d'Ivoire), 2014
A	Œ	B	BH	D	DH	E	Ʌ	Ɛ	Æ	F	G	GB	GW	H	I	Ɩ	K	KP	KW	L	M	N	O	Ɤ	Ɔ	P	R	S	T	U	Ɯ	Ʋ	V	W	Y	Z
a	œ	b	bh	d	dh	e	ʌ	ɛ	æ	f	g	gb	gw	h	i	ɩ	k	kp	kw	l	m	n	o	ɤ	ɔ	p	r	s	t	u	ɯ	ʋ	v	w	y	z
IPA value
a	ɒ	b	ɓ	d	ɗ	e	ʌ	ɛ	æ	f	ɡ	ɡ͡b	ɡʷ	h	i	ɪ	k	k͡p	kʷ	l	m	n	o	ɤ	ɔ	p	r	s	t	u	ɯ	ʊ	v	w	j	z

Tones are marked as follows: extra high tone: a̋; high tone: á; medium tone: ā; low tone: à; extra low tone: ȁ; high drop tone: â; extra low hanging tone: aʼ.

The digraphs ⟨bh, dh, gb gw, kp, kw⟩ keep the same values as in the spelling of 1982, and the nasal vowels are also indicated by appending the letter n after the letter of the vowel ⟨an, æn, ʌn, ɛn, in, ɔn, œn, un⟩.
