= Vai–Kono languages =

Language subfamily

Vai–Kono
- Geographic distribution: Liberia and Sierra Leone
- Linguistic classification: Niger–Congo ?: Mande; Western Mande; Central West; Central Mande; Manding–Jɔgɔ; Manding–Vai; Vai–Kono
- Subdivisions: Vai; Kono; ?Dama†

Language codes
- Glottolog: vaik1238

The Vai–Kono languages, Vai and Kono, form a branch of the Mande languages spoken in Liberia and Sierra Leone. Extinct Dama is said to have been similar and thus may have been related.
