= Banka language =

Mande language of Mali

Banka
- Bankagooma
- Region: Mali
- Native speakers: 6,000 (2007)
- Language family: Niger–Congo: Mande; Western; Northwestern; Samogo; Banka

Language codes
- ISO 639-3: bxw
- Glottolog: bank1258
- ELP: Bankagooma

Banka, or Bankagooma, is a minor Mande language of Mali. There is a reasonable degree of mutual intelligibility with Duun.
