= Mano language =

Mande language spoken in West Africa

Mano
- Region: Liberia, Guinea
- Ethnicity: Mano people
- Native speakers: 430,000 (2017–2020)
- Language family: Niger–Congo: Mande; Eastern Mande; Southeastern; Mano–Dan; Mano

Language codes
- ISO 639-3: mev
- Glottolog: mann1248

A Mano speaker, recorded in Liberia.

The Mah language, also known as Mano, Mah, Mah-Yacouba, and Mawe, is a significant Mande language of Liberia and Guinea. It is spoken primarily in Nimba County in north-central Liberia and in Nzérékoré, Lola and Yomou Prefectures in Guinea.

== Phonology ==
=== Vowels ===
	Front		Central		Back	
	oral	nasal	oral	nasal	oral	nasal
Close	i	ĩ			u	ũ
Close-mid	e				o	
Open-mid	ɛ	ɛ̃			ɔ	ɔ̃
Open			a	ã		

=== Consonants ===
		Labial	Alveolar	Palatal	Velar	Labialized Velar	Velar-Labial
Nasals		m	n	ɲ	ŋ	ŋʷ	
Plosives	voiceless	p	t		k	kʷ	k͡p
Plosives	voiced	b	d		g	ɡʷ	ɡ͡b
Implosive		ɓ					
Fricatives	voiceless	f	s				
Fricatives	voiced	v	z				
Approximants		w	l	j			

=== Tones ===
The language has nine register and contour tones.

== Sample Text ==
Kɛɛ pɛ séĩ é tĩã kɛɛ̀ ɓea, Wééa e ke ɓe. Wéé e kília e kɛ Wálà píé, ɛ̃ɛ̃ e kɛ Wálà ká. Wéé e kília e kɛ Wálà píé pɛ séĩ ga-gbɛ̃pìà. Wééa kolo làa lɛ́ Wálà e pɛ séĩ kɛɛ. Pɛ séĩ lɛ́ e ɓea dò wá ɓe kɛ à kɛɛ̀ é gɔ̃ kɛɛ̀á à kolo là. Kèɓe e kɛ Wééa yí. Kèɓe e kília e kɛ lɛ̀ fɔ̀nɔɔ̀ɔ ká mia lɛ̀ɛ. Lɛ̀ fɔ̀nɔɔ̀ɔ e kília, lɛ́ɛ̀ lɛ̀ fɔ̀nɔ bĩ tii bà, ɛ̃ɛ̃ bĩ tii e kília à kɔ̀ lɛ̀ɛ́ die do lɛ̀ fɔ̀nɔɔ̀ɔ là. Gɔ̃ doó lɛ́ ò si Zɔ̃ɔ̃ɔ e kɛ ɓe. Wálà lɛ́ e à vɔɔ.

In the beginning was the Word, and the Word was with God, and the Word was God. All things were made by him, and without him not any thing made that was made. In him was life, and the life was the light of men. And the light shineth in darkness, and the darkness comprehended it not. There was a man sent from God, whose name was John.

— The Bible

== See also ==
- Languages of Liberia
