= Dama language =

Dama may refer to:

- A dialect of the Khoekhoe language spoken by the Damara people
- Dama language (Cameroon), possibly a dialect of Mono
- Dama language (Sierra Leone), extinct and unclassified
