= Mokole languages =

Group of languages in Guinea and Sierra Leone

Mokole
- Geographic distribution: Guinea and Sierra Leone
- Linguistic classification: Mande: Western Mande; Central; Manding–Jogo; Manding–Vai; Manding–Mokole; Mokole
- Subdivisions: Kakabe; Kuranko; Lele; Mixifore

Language codes
- Glottolog: nucl1445

The Mokole languages are a small group of Mande languages of Guinea and Sierra Leone. They are Kakabe, Kuranko, Lele, and Mixifore.
