= Soninke–Bozo languages =

Language subfamily

Soninke–Bozo
- Geographic distribution: West Africa
- Linguistic classification: Niger–Congo?: Mande; Western Mande; Northwestern; Soninke–Bobo; Soninke–Bozo
- Subdivisions: Soninke; Bozo

Language codes
- Glottolog: soni1257

The Soninke–Bozo languages, Soninke and Bozo, form a branch of the Mande languages spoken across western Africa.
