= Susu language =

Mande language

Susu
- Sosoxui
- Native to: Guinea, Sierra Leone, Guinea Bissau
- Region: Coastal Guinea
- Ethnicity: Susu people
- Native speakers: 2.4 million (2017–2019)
- Language family: Niger–Congo?: Mande; Western Mande; Central; Soso–Yalunka; Susu
- Writing system: Latin script Arabic script Koré Sèbèli

Language codes
- ISO 639-2: sus
- ISO 639-3: sus
- Glottolog: susu1250

Susu (endonym: Susu: Sosoxui; French: Soussou) is the language of the Susu or Soso people of Guinea and Sierra Leone, West Africa. It is in the Mande language family, and its closest relative is Yalunka.

It is one of the national languages of Guinea and spoken mainly in the coastal region of the country.

== History ==
The language was also used by people in the coastal regions of Guinea and Sierra Leone as a trade language.

The first literature in Susu was a translation of the first seven chapters of the Gospel of Matthew, translated by John Godfrey Wilhelm of the Church Mission Society. This was published in London as "Lingjili Matthew" in 1816. J.G. Wilhelm translated a considerable portion of the New Testament, but only this small part appears to have been printed.

== Phonology ==
Susu consonants
		Labial	Alveolar	Palatal	Velar	Labial- velar	Glottal
Nasal		m ⟨m⟩	n ⟨n⟩	ɲ ⟨ɲ⟩	ŋ ⟨ŋ⟩		
Plosive	voiceless	p ⟨p⟩	t ⟨t⟩		k ⟨k⟩		
Plosive	voiced	b ⟨b⟩	d ⟨d⟩		ɡ ⟨g⟩	ɡb ⟨gb⟩	
Plosive	prenasal		nd ⟨nd⟩		ŋɡ ⟨ng⟩		
Fricative		f ⟨f⟩	s ⟨s⟩		x ⟨x⟩		h ⟨h⟩
Trill			r ⟨r⟩				
Approximant			l ⟨l⟩	j ⟨y⟩		w ⟨w⟩	

Susu vowels
	Front	Back
Close	i ⟨i⟩, iː ⟨ii⟩	u ⟨u⟩, uː ⟨uu⟩
Close-mid	e ⟨e⟩, eː ⟨ee⟩	o ⟨o⟩, oː ⟨oo⟩
Open-mid	ɛ ⟨ɛ⟩, ɛː ⟨ɛɛ⟩	ɔ ⟨ɔ⟩, ɔː ⟨ɔɔ⟩
Open	a ⟨a⟩, aː ⟨aa⟩	

Nasal vowels
	Front	Back
Close	ĩ ⟨in⟩	ũ ⟨un⟩
Close-mid	ẽ ⟨en⟩	õ ⟨on⟩
Open-mid	ɛ̃ ⟨ɛn⟩	ɔ̃ ⟨ɔn⟩
Open	ã ⟨an⟩	

== Grammatical sketch ==
Susu is an SOV language, Poss-N, N-D, generally suffixing, non-pro-drop, wh-in-situ, with no agreement affixes on the verb, no noun classes, no gender, and with a clitic plural marker which attaches to the last element of the NP (N or D, typically), but does not co-occur with numerals. It has no definite or indefinite articles. Sentential negation is expressed with a particle, mu, whose distribution is unclear (with adjectival predicates it seems to sometimes infix, but with transitive verbs it comes before the object).

Examples:

khame didi to ne
man boy see PAST
"The/a man saw the/a boy."

=== Pronouns ===
n taami don ma
1sg bread eat PRES(generic)
"I eat bread."

i taami don ma
2sg bread eat PRES(generic)
"You (sg) eat bread."

a taami don ma
3sg bread eat PRES(generic)
"He/she/it eats bread."

won taami don ma
1inc.pl bread eat PRES(generic)
"We (including you) eat bread."

mukhu taami don ma
1exc.pl bread eat PRES(generic)
"We (excluding you) eat bread."

wo taami don ma
2pl bread eat PRES(generic)
"You (pl or polite [sg or pl]) eat bread." ("wo" is used as French "vous")

e taami don ma
3pl bread eat PRES(generic)
"They eat bread."

cf.

n bankhi to né
1sg house see PAST
"I saw a/the house."

n taami don fe
1sg bread eat PROG
"I am eating the bread."

Object pronouns have the same form as subject pronouns:

khame n to né
man 1sg see PAST
"A/the man saw me."

khame i to né
man 2sg see PAST
"A/the man saw you (sg)."

khame a to né
man 3sg see PAST
"A/the man saw him/her/it."

khame won to né
man 1inc.pl see PAST
"A/the man saw us (including you)."

khame mukhu to né
man 1exc.pl see PAST
"A/the man saw us (excluding you)."

khame wo to né
man 2pl see PAST
"A/the man saw you (pl)."

khame e to né
man 3pl see PAST
"A/the man saw them."

Possessive affixes precede the noun:

baba "father": m baba "my father" i baba "your (sg) father" a baba "his/her/its father" wom baba "our father" wo baba "your (pl) father" e baba "their father"

=== Adverbs ===
Adverbs can precede the subject or follow the verb:

khoro n fa né
yesterday 1sg arrive PAST
"Yesterday I arrived."

n fa né khoro
1sg arrive PAST yesterday
"I arrived yesterday."

=== Grammatical number ===
NPs come in a variety of forms:

khamé "boy (sg)", khame e "boys (pl) taami "bread (sg)", taami e "breads (pl)"

khame e taami don ma
boy pl bread eat PRES
"The/0 boys eat bread."

khamé taami e don ma
boy bread pl eat PRES
"The/a boy eats breads."

=== Numerals ===
woto keren
car one
"one car"

woto firin
car two
"two cars"

woto sakhan
car three
"three cars"

woto nani
car four
"four cars"

woto suli
car five
"five cars"

woto senni
car six
"six cars"

woto solofere
car seven
"seven cars"

woto solomasakhan
car eight
"eight cars"

woto solomanani
car nine
"nine cars"

woto fu
car ten
"ten cars"

woto fu nun keren
car ten and one
"eleven cars"

woto fu nun firin
car ten and two
"twelve cars"

=== Others ===
n woto nde e to né
1sg car indef.D pl see PAST
"I saw several cars"/"J'ai vu des autos."

woto nde
car indef.D
"some car"

di nde
boy indef.D
"some boy"

bangkhi nde
house indef.D
"some house"

khame nde
man indef.D
"someone"

se nde
thing? indef.D
"something"

nde
who/indef.D
"who/some"

i nde to?
you who see
"Who did you see?"

i munse don ma?
2sg what eat PRES
"What will you eat?"

== Orthography ==
Susu has been written with a variety of writing systems, including the Ajami variant of the Arabic script (perhaps introduced during the time of the Imamate of Futa Jallon), various Latin script orthographies (formalized with the adoption of the Guinean languages alphabet under the government of Ahmed Sékou Touré and adapted in 1989 to adhere closer to the African reference alphabet), and the N'ko and Adlam scripts. Additionally, an alphabetic script known as Koré Sèbèli or Wakara, developed by sociologist Mohamed Bentoura Bangoura based on traditional symbols used by secret societies, has been adopted by a small community of users since its introduction in 2009.
