= Lele language (Guinea) =

Mande language of Guinea

Lele
- Native to: Guinea
- Region: Kissidougou and Guéckédou Prefectures
- Native speakers: 49,000 (2017)
- Language family: Niger–Congo: Mande; Western Mande; Central–Western; Central Mande; Manding–Jogo; Manding–Vai; Manding–Mokole; Mokole; Lele

Language codes
- ISO 639-3: llc
- Glottolog: lele1266

Lele is a Mande language of Guinea.
