= Yalunka language =

Mande language spoken in West Africa

Yalunka
- Jalonke, Dialonke
- Native to: Guinea
- Region: Southeastern Guinea, Senegal–Mali border
- Ethnicity: Yalunka people
- Native speakers: 181,000 (2002–2017)
- Language family: Niger–Congo: Mande; Western Mande; Central; Susu–Yalunka; Yalunka

Language codes
- ISO 639-3: yal
- Glottolog: yalu1240

Yalunka (also spelled Yalunke, Jalonke, Kjalonke, Dyalonké, Djallonké, or Dialonké) is the language of the Yalunka people of Guinea, Sierra Leone, Mali, and Senegal in West Africa. It is in the Mande language family. Yalunka is closely related to the Susu language.

== Grammatical Features ==
The Yalunka language in Guinea is more order sensitive than many other languages. There is very little affixing that marks grammatical function of a word or requirements of agreement between words in the sentence. There is comparatively little morphology and only minor inflectional affixing. There are not long conjugations of verb tenses. Instead, the language relies on clause order to define the grammatical function of each word. For this reason, the linguistic concept of slots in the clause and phrase structure is effective in the description of the Yalunka language.

The clause structure of the Yalunka language is basically a series of slots. There is the possibility of a conjunction and adverb of time at the beginning of the clause. There is necessarily a subject noun phrase except in the case of imperative constructions. There is then the possibility of an internal adverb thereafter followed by an optionally appearing aspect marker. For transitive verbs, a direct object may appear after the aspect marker which is followed by the verb. The verb is the minimal utterance of the Yalunka language, e.g. /siga/ 'go'. The verb may optionally be accompanied by a suffix which does not usually co-occur with the aspect marker (except with /yi/). After the verb there are two different kinds of obliques, one occurring before and one after the /nɛn/ which is a particle shrouded in a respectable degree of mystery. Those obliques occurring before the /nɛn/ tend to relate closely to the meaning of the verb and modify it, while those obliques to the right of /nɛn/ are post positions of location, post positions of time, and adverbs. They come in that order. After the obliques there is another rather limber particle /nun/ and finally a whole class of colorful emphatic markers that bear a much higher tone than the previous words in the sentence. All categories except the verb are optional.

Xoro, a yi sigama a ra nɛn xɛɛn ma nun, koni a mi sigaxi.
Yesterday, he had been going to take it to the field, but he didn't go.

=== Aspect Markers, Verb Suffixes, and Verbs ===
There are many aspect markers and verb suffixes that play the primary role in modifying and qualifying the meaning of the verb. In Yalunka, as in other northwestern Mande languages, one does not talk about time-oriented "tenses" as much as "aspects" of the verb like whether the action is "accomplished" or "not accomplished." Other features associated with apect markers and verb suffixes are whether or not the action is in the immediate context and whether or not the action is real (if the aspect of the clause speaks of actions not happening in reality, that feature is described as "irrealis").

=== Aspect Markers ===
/bata/
One of the most common words in Yalunka is the aspect marker /bata/. This word is the same word that appears in Maninka and Susu as /bara/. The features of meaning associated with this word are those of "accomplished" and "immediate." When the word /bata/ appears in the aspect marker slot in the sentence, the action of the verb takes on the meaning of having been accomplished in the immediate context.
This aspect marker optionally undergoes a phonological interaction with the subject pronoun to form a contraction as follows:

	Pronoun	+ /bata/
1st person singular	n	/manta/ or /mata/
2nd person singular	i	/inta/
3rd person singular	a	/anta/
1st person plural (inclusive)	en	/en manta/
1st person plural (exclusive)	nxu	/nxunta/
2nd person plural	ɛ	/ɛnta/
3rd person plural	e	/enta/

/xa/
This aspect marker indicates that the action of the verb is desired or permitted.

/nama/
This aspect marker serves to form a negative imperative.
