= Samogo languages =

Language native to Mali

Samogo
- Geographic distribution: Mali and Burkina Faso
- Linguistic classification: Niger–Congo: Mande; Western; Northwest; Samogo
- Subdivisions: Sembla; Duun; ? Jowulu

Language codes
- Glottolog: samo1309

The Samogo languages are a small group of Mande languages of Mali and Burkina Faso.

- Samogo
  - Seenku (Seeku, Sembla, Seemogo)
  - Duun
    - Dzuun (East Duun). Dialects: Kpango (Kpan, Samoro-guan), Dzùùngoo (Samogo-iri).
    - Duun (West Duun, Du, Duungooma, Samogo-sien)
    - Banka (Bankagooma)
  - Jowulu (Jɔ)

Jowulu is divergent.

The name Samogo or Samogho is a Jula and Bambara term for several Mande languages which do not necessarily form a clade, including the Samo languages.
