= Gagu people =

Ivorian ethnic group

The Gagu people are a south-central Ivory Coast ethnic group, likely the first in the region.

== Culture ==
In addition to farming, the Gagu also hunt and gather. They make clothing from bark. In the 21st century, the Gagu acculaturated to the Guro language, which many Gagu speak as their primary language.

== Population ==
The Gagu population totaled 25,000 in the mid-1990s and 61,000 in the mid-2010s.

== Bibliography ==
- Daddieh, Cyril K. (2016). "Gagu". Historical Dictionary of Cote d'Ivoire (The Ivory Coast). Rowman & Littlefield. pp. 259–. ISBN 978-0-8108-7389-6.
- Olson, James Stuart; Meur, Charles, eds. (1996). "Gagu". The Peoples of Africa: An Ethnohistorical Dictionary. Greenwood Publishing Group. p. 187. ISBN 978-0-313-27918-8.
