= Kakabe language =

Mande language of Guinea

Kakabe
- Native to: Guinea
- Ethnicity: 50,000 (2012)
- Native speakers: 10,000 (2012)
- Language family: Niger–Congo: Mande; Western Mande; Central–Western; Central Mande; Manding–Jogo; Manding–Vai; Manding–Mokole; Mokole; Kakabe

Language codes
- ISO 639-3: kke
- Glottolog: kaka1265

Kakabe is a Mande language of Guinea. The speakers of the Kakabe language reside in the Futa-Jallon plateau which is located in Guinea. Kakabe belongs to the Mokole group, which is the closest group to the Manding people in terms of culture and language. The language is spoken in a number of villages that are situated on the Futa-Jallon plateau in Guinea.
