= Dama y obrero =

Dama y obrero may refer to:

- Dama y obrero (Chilean TV series)
- Dama y obrero (U.S. TV series)
