= Bobo language =

Mande language of Burkina Faso

Bobo
- Bobo
- Region: Burkina Faso, Mali
- Ethnicity: Bobo
- Native speakers: (340,000 cited 1995–2021)
- Language family: Niger–Congo?: Mande; Western Mande; Northwestern; Soninke–Bobo; Bobo

Language codes
- ISO 639-3: Either: bwq – Southern bbo – Northern
- Glottolog: bobo1253
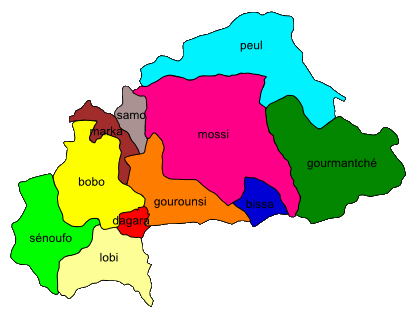
- Majority areas of Bobo speakers, in medium yellow, on a map of Burkina Faso

The Bobo language is a Mande language of Burkina Faso and Mali; the western city of Bobo Dioulasso is named partly for the Bobo people. It consists of Northern and Southern dialects. The Northern dialect is also known as Konabéré. Northern and Southern Bobo share only 20%–30% intelligibility according to Ethnologue, and by that standard are considered separate languages.

The terms Bobo Fing 'Black Bobo' and Bobo Madaré are used to distinguish them from Bobo Gbe 'White Bobo' and the Bobo Oule 'Red Bobo' of Burkina.
