= Mano people =

Ethnic group in Liberia

Mano Yacouba
Total population
- 472,000–510,000

Regions with significant populations
- Liberia: 357,000–408,000
- Guinea: 102,000–115,000

Languages
- Mano language

Religion
- Islam, Animism

Related ethnic groups
- Dan people, Kpelle people, Mende people

The Mano people, also known as Mano-Dan and Yacouba, are an ethnic group of Liberia and Guinea. The group speaks the Mano language, which belongs to the Mande language family.

== Mano people in Liberia ==
The Mano ethnic group occupy the northeastern part of Liberia known as Nimba County and some parts of modern-day Guinea, in the forest section of that republic. According to John Gbatu, (1919-2010), a prominent Mano tribal leader, the name Nimba originates with the Mano dialect which in Mano is Niemba/Nyamba Tun (Mount Nimba). The meaning is "hills on which young maidens will slip and fall".

This is so because the Mano used to worship Wala/Ya'ala/Nyamba (the Creator God) up what is today known as Mt. Nimba in Liberia. They occupied major cities and towns in Niemba such as Ganta, Yekepa, Sanniquellie, and Scalepea amongst others.

According to Stanley Delano Quaye (1985-), a Liberian Historical Economist and Banker and grandson of John Gbatu, the Mano belongs to the Mande speaking group and has had a long history. He narrated that the tribe migrated from Sudan and settled in the Mali empire and subsequently to the republic of Guinea where they formed a Kingdom in the Youmou area. They later migrated to what is Liberia during the term of the thirteenth and fourteenth centuries, a larger portion arrived during the turn of the sixteenth and seventeen centuries.

Stanley Delano Quaye has done research in anthropology and the political structure of the Mano and Gio tribes. His noted paper discusses the political and economic governance of the tribes. The Manos are also skilled musicians, warriors and excellent in the arts and crafts. In modern day Liberia, they occupy positions in national government, banking and engineering. They are among Liberia's best doctors and engineers.

== Origins ==
The mano alongside their Dan brothers descend from the Mandé peoples. The Dan are known as the "small brothers" of the Mano. They subsequently emigrated from the Mali empire, where they were known as the Soumano/Danhou Maghan clan of the Gbara. They travelled to Mano/Dan land part of present-day Liberia Guinea and Cote D'Ivoire at the turn of the 16th and 17th centuries, occupying the Nimba Range. They helped defend the empire against invaders from mainly North Africa. The Mano have two traditional schools: the poro for men and the sande for women.

As Christianity spread to Northern Liberia during the 19th century, many Mano abandoned their traditional practices and took to western religious groups such as the Methodist and Catholic churches. Dr. George Way Harley, a missionary from the United States settled in Ganta and started the Ganta United Mission which later grew to high schools, hospitals and colleges (the mission station now houses the Winifred J. Harley School of Nursing named after his wife). Dr. Harley bought many masks from the locals and established a museum in Cleveland, United States. He died on November 7, 1966. His ashes were flown to Ganta to be buried near the mission station having spent over 35 years in Ganta.

The Mano are excellent in arts and crafts; they are also gifted musicians and farmers. Mano are also in Guinea; it is common to see Mano towns in Guinea to have similar names cultures with that of their Liberian brothers. This is why during the Liberian Civil War, most Liberian Manos were welcomed and treated with great pity and hospitality by their Guineans brothers. In fact, during the great siege of Ganta, high ranking Manos in the Guinean Army provided military aid to Mano defenders in Liberia.

Today, the region they occupied have common bustling towns in terms of trade and commerce mainly by their Dan brothers. The Manos have close culture and language similarity with the Gios (Dan). They are the two major tribes in Nimba county.
