= Jowulu language =

Mande language of Mali and Burkina Faso

Jowulu
- Jɔ
- Native to: Mali, Burkina Faso
- Native speakers: (20,000 cited 1999–2021)
- Language family: Niger–Congo: Mande; Western; Samogo?; Jowulu

Language codes
- ISO 639-3: jow
- Glottolog: jowu1238

Jowulu, also known as Jɔ or ambiguously as Samogho, is a minor Mande language of Mali and Burkina Faso.
