= Kuranko language =

Mande language spoken in West Africa

Kuranko
- Native to: Sierra Leone, Guinea
- Ethnicity: Kuranko
- Native speakers: 670,000 (2017–2021)
- Language family: Niger–Congo: Mande; Western; Central–Western; Central; Manding–Jogo; Manding–Vai; Manding–Mokole; Mokole; Kuranko
- Writing system: Latin

Language codes
- ISO 639-3: knk
- Glottolog: kura1250

Kuranko is a Mande language spoken in Southwestern Africa by approximately 350,000 Kuranko people in Sierra Leone and Guinea. In Guinea it blends into Eastern Maninkakan dialectologically, but the people are ethnically distinct.
