= André Prost =

French missionary and linguist

- Born: 28 August 1903; France
- Died: 24 May 1987 (aged 83)
- Occupations: Missionary and linguist

Academic work
- Main interests: Languages of West Africa

Father André Prost (born 28 August 1903 in Orgelet, Jura; died 24 May 1987 in Bry-sur-Marne) was a French missionary, Africanist, and linguist.

As a White Father, he was a member of the Société des africanistes since 1932, and was a founding member of the Société des linguistes de l'Afrique occidentale (SLAO).

He authored some fifty books and articles on the languages of West Africa.
