= Duun language =

Language of Mali and Burkina Faso

Duun
- Duungooma; Dzuungoo
- Region: Mali, Burkina Faso
- Native speakers: 150,000 (2018)
- Language family: Niger–Congo: Mande; Western; Northwestern; Samogo; Duun

Language codes
- ISO 639-3: Either: dux – Duungooma dnn – Dzùùngoo
- Glottolog: duun1242 Duungooma dzuu1241 Dzùùngoo

Duun is a Mande language of Mali. There are three varieties of Duun, West Duun, or Duungooma (also known as Du, Samogho-sien) and Banka or Bankagooma, in Mali, and East Duun, or Dzùùn(goo), in Burkina Faso. These are clearly distinct but have a reasonable degree of mutual intelligibility with each other.

Dialects of East Duun, Kpan (Kpango, Samoro-guan) and Dzùùngoo (Samogo-iri), are easily intelligible.

== Phonology ==
The phonology of the Dunn languages contains 26 consonants and 12 vowels. The following phonemes are in the International Phonetic Alphabet (IPA).

Consonant Phonemes
		Labial	Alveolar	Palatal	Velar	Labial-velar
Obstruent	Occlusive	p b	t d	c ɟ	k g	kp gb
Obstruent	Affricate		ts dz			
Obstruent	Fricative	f v	s	ʃ ʒ	x	
Sonorant	Nasal	m	n	ɲ	ŋ	ŋm
Sonorant	Approximant	w	l	j		

Vowel Phonemes
		Unrounded	Rounded
Closed	Oral	i	u
Closed	Nasal	ĩ	ũ
Half-closed		e	o
Mid-open	Oral	ɛ	ɔ
Mid-open	Nasal	ɛ̃	ɔ̃
Open	Oral	a	
Open	Nasal	ã	

== Alphabet ==
The Duun alphabet has the following letters

1. a
2. b
3. c
4. d
5. e
6. ɛ
7. f
8. g
9. gb
10. h
11. i
12. j
13. k
14. kp
15. l
16. m
17. n
18. ɲ
19. ŋ
20. ŋm
21. o
22. ɔ
23. p
24. r
25. s
26. sh
27. t
28. u
29. v
30. w
31. x
32. y
33. z
34. zh
