= Sembla language =

Western Mande language of Burkina Faso

Sembla
- Seenku
- Region: Burkina Faso
- Native speakers: 16,000 (2009)
- Language family: Niger–Congo: Mande; Western; Northwestern; Samogo; Sembla

Language codes
- ISO 639-3: sos
- Glottolog: seek1238

Sembla, Sambla,or Seenku, is a Western Mande language within the Samogo group of Burkina Faso. The northern dialect called Timiku and the southern one called Gbeneku are easily intelligible.

The language is also known as Samogho and "Southern Samo", which is also the name of one of the Samo languages.

This language also has a complex speech replacement system, which is implemented on the Sambla balafon, where the words of the Sambla language are translated into music, similar to the more famous talking drum communication.
