= Ligbi language =

Mande language spoken in Ghana

Ligbi
- Native to: Ghana
- Region: Brong-Ahafo region, adjacent part of Ivory Coast
- Native speakers: (19,000 cited 1991–2003)
- Language family: Niger–Congo: Mande; Western Mande; Central; Manding–Jogo; Jogo–Jeri; Jogo; Ligbi

Language codes
- ISO 639-3: lig
- Glottolog: ligb1244
- ELP: Hwela

The Ligbi (or Ligby) people speak a Mande language in Ghana, in the north-west corner of the Brong-Ahafo Region. Ligbi is spoken by approximately 10,000 speakers (1988 GILLBT/SIL). It is fairly closely related to Jula, Vai and Kono. A small population of Ligbi speakers (around 4,000) is reported to live in Ivory Coast (Vanderaa 1991). Ligbi is also known as Wela (Hwela) or Numu. The latter of these refers to a subsection of the Ligbi people; Numu is Dyula for 'blacksmith'. (See blacksmiths of western Africa.)

The Ligbi area in Ghana is bordered to the west by Nafaanra, the Senufo language of the Nafana people. The Ligbi people have come to the area of Begho (Bighu), an ancient trading town on the Tain river in Ghana, in the early 17th century before the Nafana. Ligbi has seven oral and seven nasal vowels. It is a tonal language with two level tones, High and Low. Syllables are of the form (C_{1})V(C_{2}) or N (a syllabic nasal), where CV is the most common syllable type. C_{1} can be any of the consonants, whereas the optional C_{2} slot can have only nasals homorganic with the following consonants, e.g., gbám mádáánè "nine houses," gbán táà "ten houses." V (a vowel) alone occurs word-initial only in personal pronouns, some loan words, and names, e.g., á jádɛ̀ "we have come."

== Phonology ==
=== Consonants ===
Consonants
		Labial	Dental	Palatal	Velar	Labial- velar	Glottal
Plosive/ Affricate	voiceless	p	t̪	tʃ	k	kp	
Plosive/ Affricate	voiced	b	d̪	dʒ	g	gb	
Nasal		m	n̪	ɲ	ŋ		
Fricative	voiceless	f	s				(h)
Fricative	voiced	(v)	(z)				
Approximant			l	j		w	

- /d/ is [r] between vowels.
- /k/ and /g/ are [ɣ] between vowels.
- /d/, /g/, and /l/ are nasalized between nasal vowels.
- /h/ occurs in English and Arabic loanwords.
- /v/ and /z/ only occur in ideophones.

=== Vowels ===
Oral vowels
	Front	Central	Back
Close	i		u
Close-mid	e		o
Open-mid	ɛ		ɔ
Open		a	

Nasal vowels
	Front	Central	Back
Close	ĩ		ũ
Close-mid	ẽ		õ
Open-mid	ɛ̃		ɔ̃
Open		ã	

=== Tones ===
Ligbi has two level tones, low and high.
