= Bobo people =

West African ethnic group

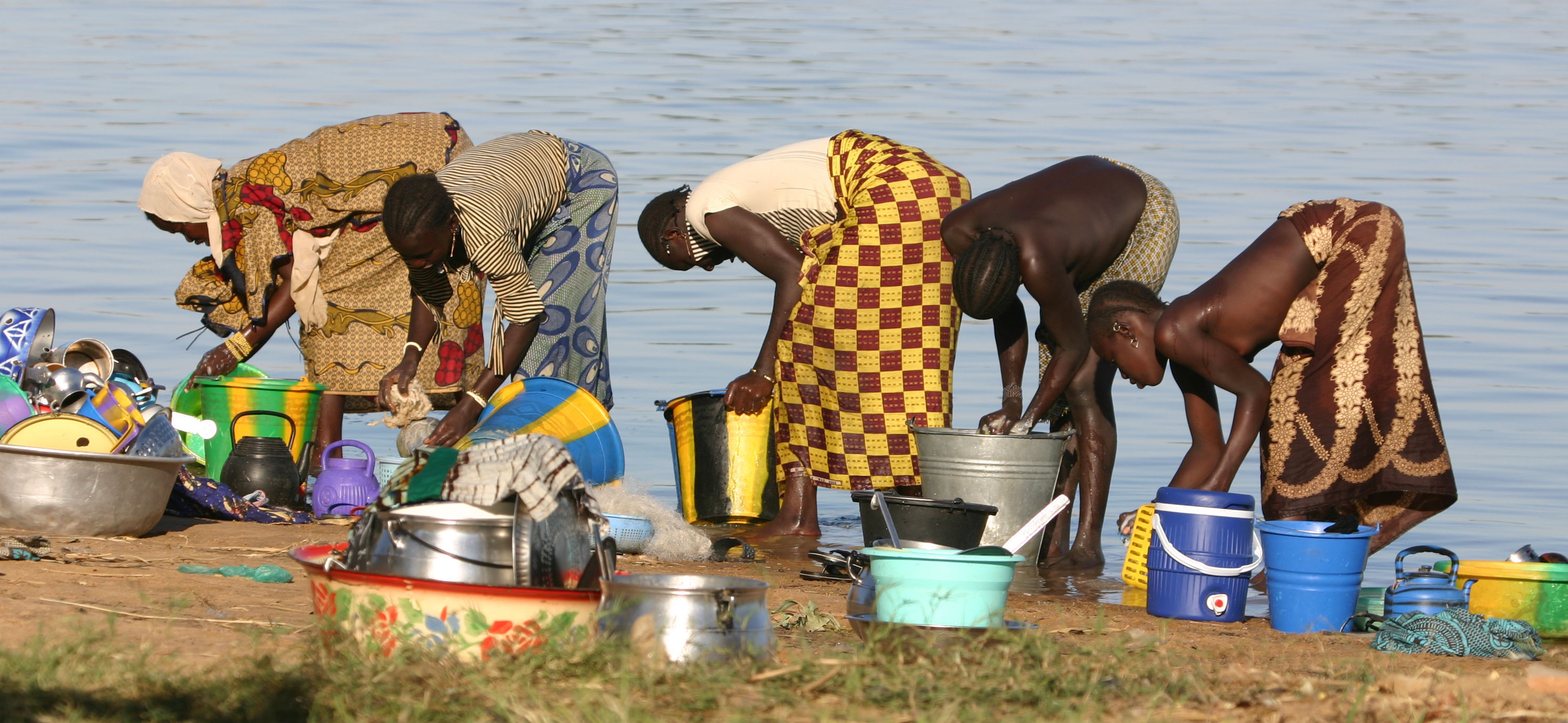
Bobo people along the Niger River in Djenné, Mali

The Bobo (sometimes called Bobo Fing) are a Mande ethnic group living primarily in Burkina Faso, with some living north in Mali. Bobo is also a shortened name of the second-largest city in Burkina Faso, Bobo-Dioulasso.

== Background ==
In much of the literature on African art, the group that lives in the area of Bobo-Dioulasso is called Bobo-Fing, literally "black Bobo". These people call themselves Bobo and speak the Bobo language, a Mande language. The Bambara people also call another ethnic group "Bobo", the Bobo-Oule/Wule, more precisely called the Bwa. While the Bwa (Bobo-Oule) are a Gur people, speaking Gur languages (the Bwa languages), the true Bobo (Bobo Madare, Bobo Fing) are a Mande people.

== Demographics ==
The Bobo number approximately 110,000 people, with the great majority in Burkina Faso. The major Bobo community in the south is Bobo-Dioulasso, the second-largest city of Burkina Faso and the old French colonial capital. Further north are large towns, including Fô and Kouka, with Boura in the extreme north in Mali.

The Bobo are the descendants of an ancient aggregation who assembled around a number of core clans, none which preserved any oral traditions of immigration into the area. The Bobo language and culture are more closely related to those of their Mandé neighbours to the north and west, the Bamana (as well as the Minianka, also known as Mamara Senoufo, and a Gur people) than to their Voltaic neighbours the Gurunsi and Mossi, but they should be thought of as a southern extension of the Mandé people who live in what is now Burkina Faso, rather than an intrusive Mandé group that has recently penetrated the region. Although over 41% of Bobo lineages claim a foreign origin, they also say that they are autochthonous.

Polygyny is common amongst the Bobo. Both levirate and sororate marriages are practiced.

== Economy ==
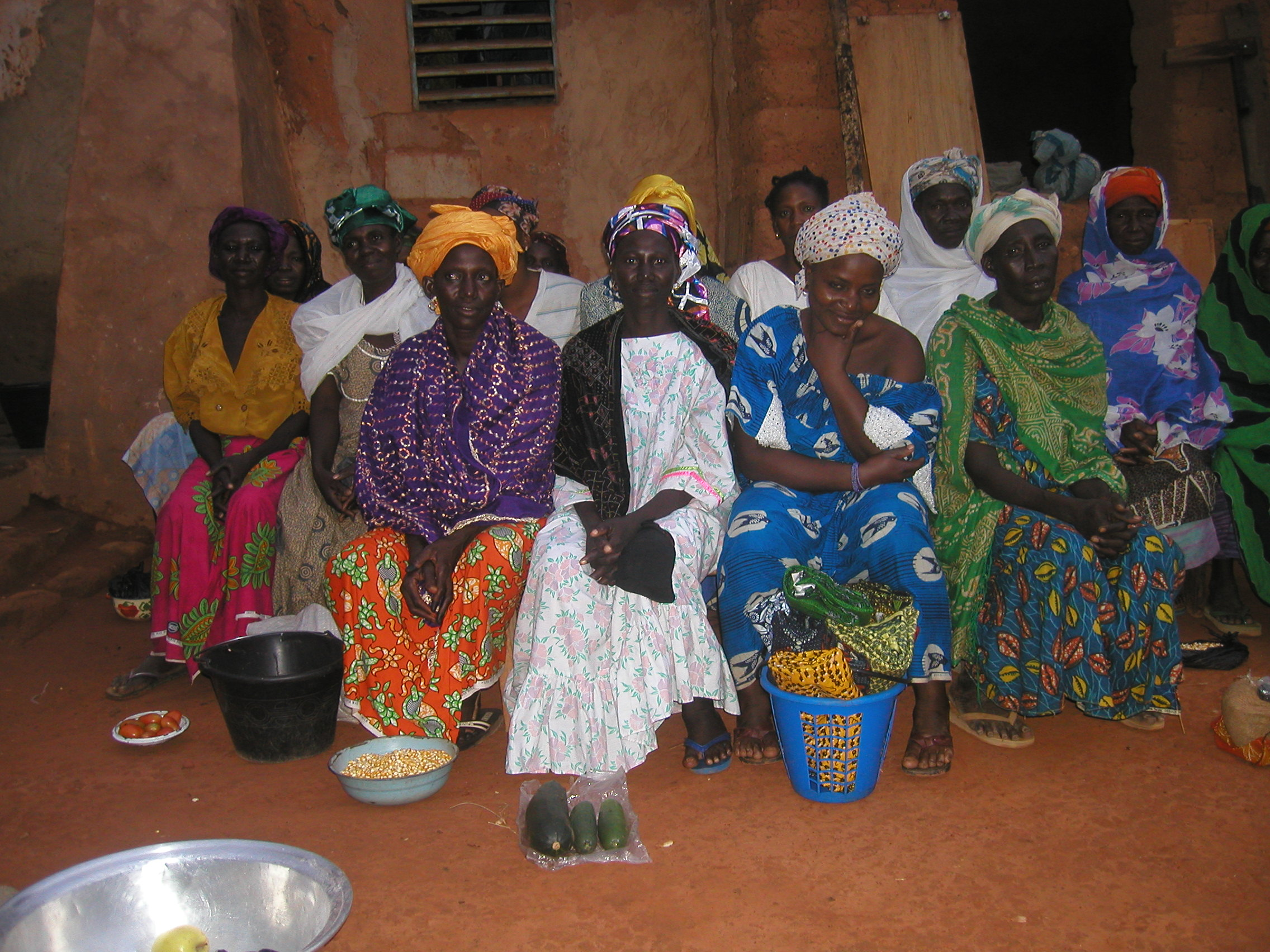
Bobo vendors in Burkina Faso

Farming among the Bobo is of primary importance. Agricultural activity is not merely a way of providing for subsistence among the Bobo, it is the essential component of their day-to-day existence. The major food crops are red sorghum, pearl millet, yams, and maize. They also cultivate cotton, which is sold to textile mills in Koudougou. Both cotton and peanuts act as the Bobo's primary cash crops. The imposition of colonial rule and the construction of these mills led to the disintegration of the local co-operative labor systems, which had served to bond the members of Bobo society together.

== Political system ==
The Bobo lineage is the fundamental social building-block. The Bobo are an inherently decentralized group of people. The concept of placing political power in the hands of an individual is foreign to the Bobo. The Bobo are ruled by a group of elders that collaboratively make decisions.

Each village is instead organized according to the relationship among individual patrilines. The lineage unites all descendants of a common ancestor, called the wakoma, the father of a particular lineage. The word "wakoma" comes from a stem, wa- that is a contraction of the Bobo word for house wasa. The Bobo lineage comprises the people who live in a common house. The wakoma may also be called the sapro, which is the general term for ancestors. As among other peoples in Burkina Faso, each clan has a totem, so that when a Bobo introduces himself, he gives his given name, then his clan name, followed by the totem that he respects.

== Religion ==
The Bobo people traditionally follow a pagan, animist religion. The creator god, Wuro, formed the earth from a ball of clay. He cannot be described and is not represented by sculptures. According to legend, Wuro created the first man, who was a blacksmith. This man received the first mask, so Bobo people continue to create masks in Wuro's honor.

Bobo cosmogony describes the creation of the world by Wuro and the ordering of his creations. He is responsible for the ordering of all things in the world into opposing pairs: man/spirits, male/female, village/bush, culture/nature and so on. The balances between forces as they were created by Wuro are precarious, and it is easy for men to throw the forces out of balance. Farming, for instance, can unbalance the precarious equilibrium between culture/nature and village/bush when the crops are gathered in the bush and brought into the village.

For the Bobo people there are two important epochs. The time of Wuro, when the universe was created, and the contemporary time, when Wuro gave man his son Dwo. Blacksmiths traditionally worship Dwo.

Some Bobo have converted to Christianity or Islam.

== Bobo masks ==
The Bobo people are well known for their mask making tradition. They create masks with detailed wooden structures that go above the mask's main body. It is possible that carved drawings may have been affixed to these masks. The masks are traditionally painted red, black, and silver/white. At the beginning of each season, masks are repainted.

=== Function ===
Masks serve multiple functions in Bobo society. First, they serve to honor the creator god Wuro. Secondly, masks play a spiritual role, erasing evil and balancing the sun, earth and rain.

=== Mask gallery ===
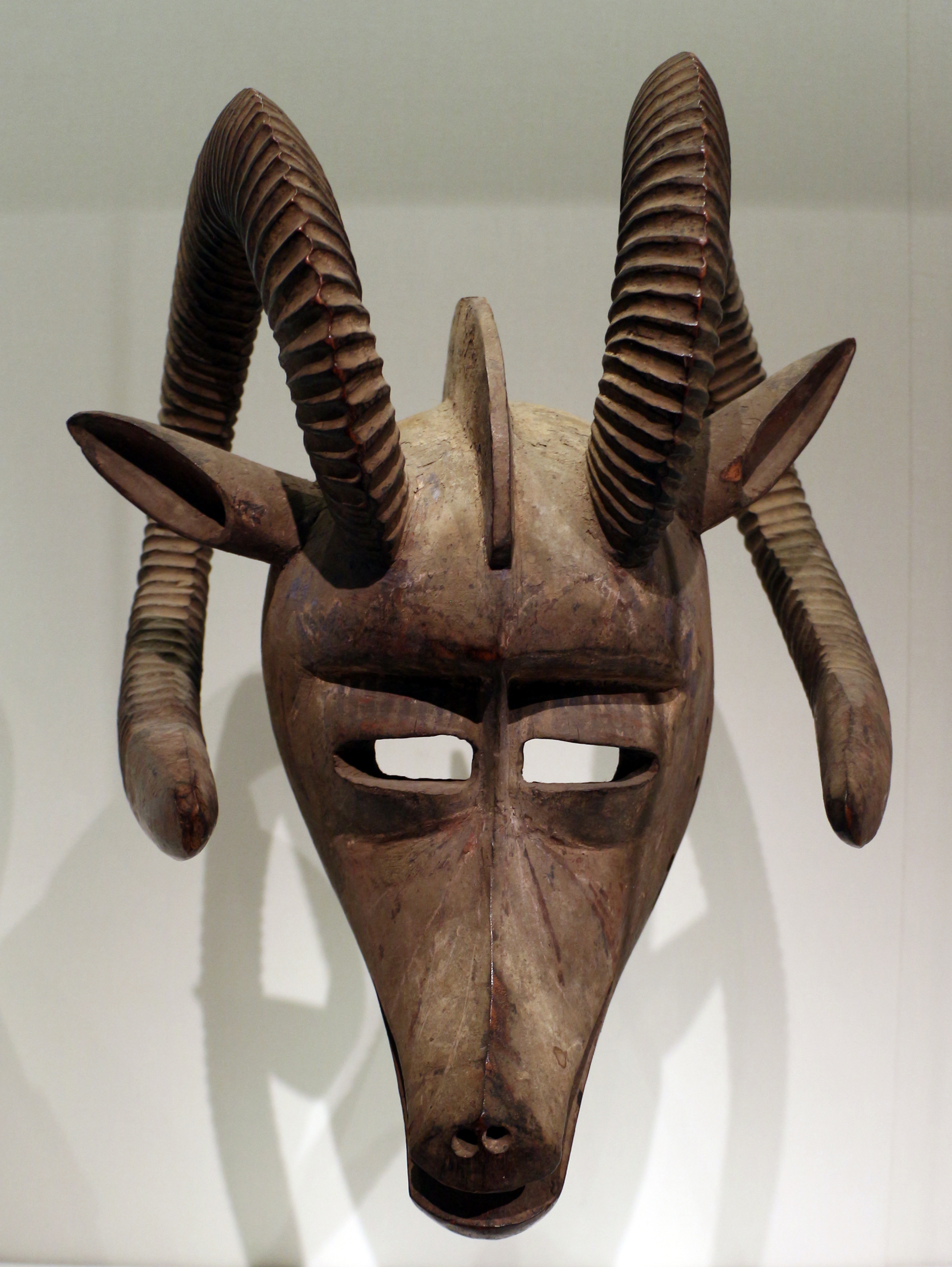
Burkina Faso, billy goat mask, c. 1910

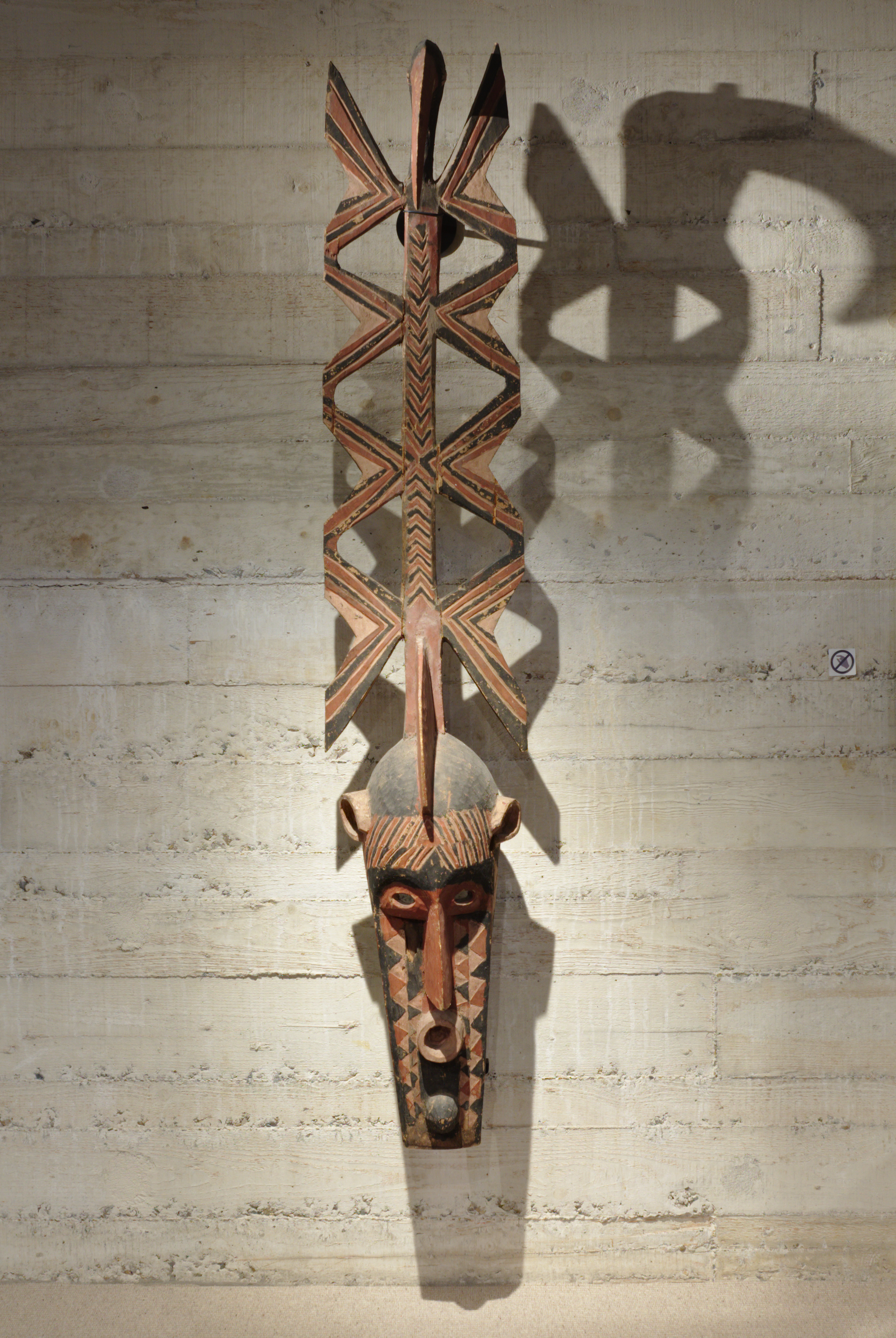
Nwenka da muna mask, 20th century

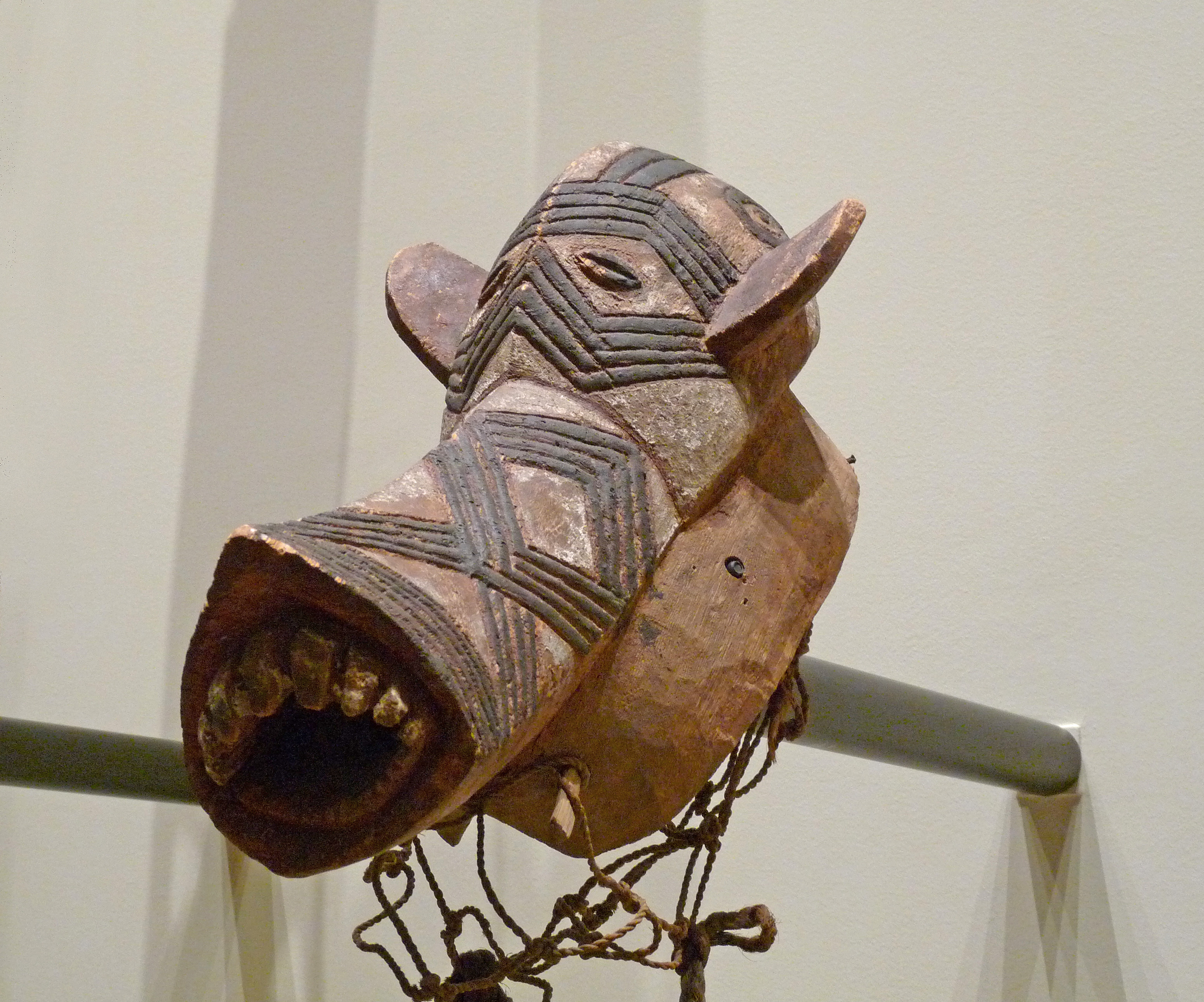
Attributed to Bobo people, Burkina Faso, Ouagadougou. Second half of the 19th century

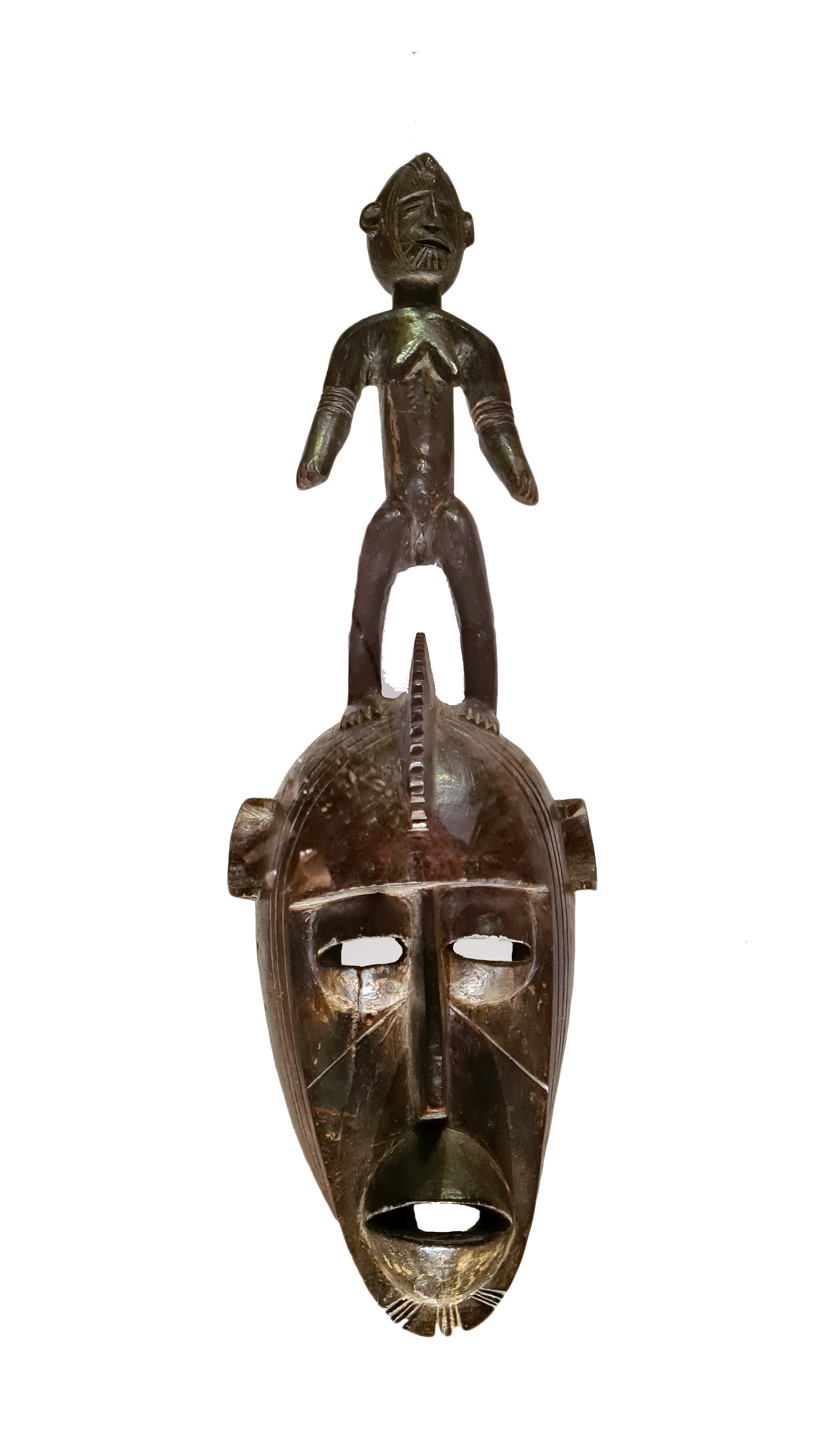
Masks of this type were made and worn by blacksmith associations at funerals and evoked the dead, 20th century

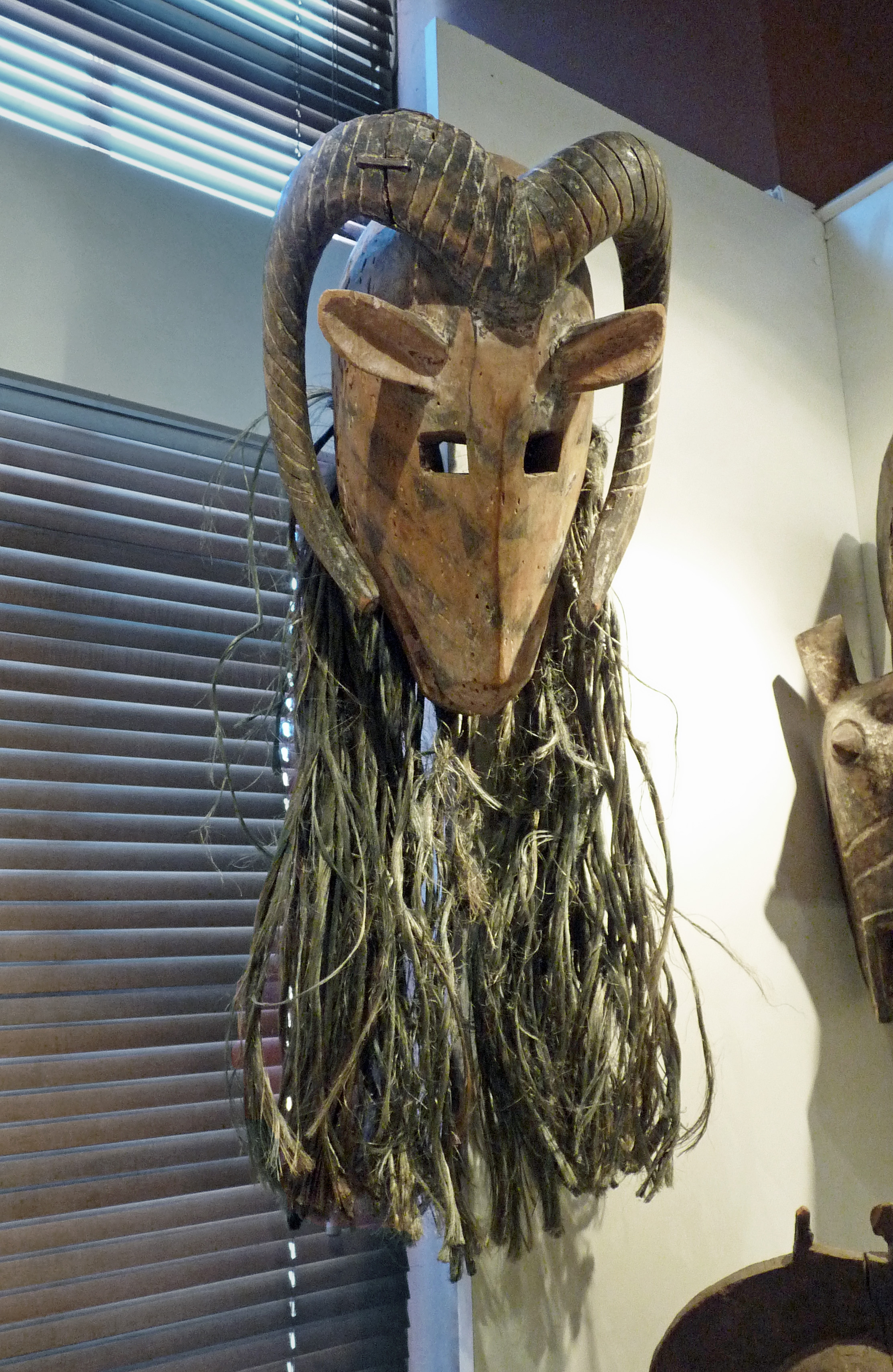
Wood, pigments, plant fibers, Burkina Faso

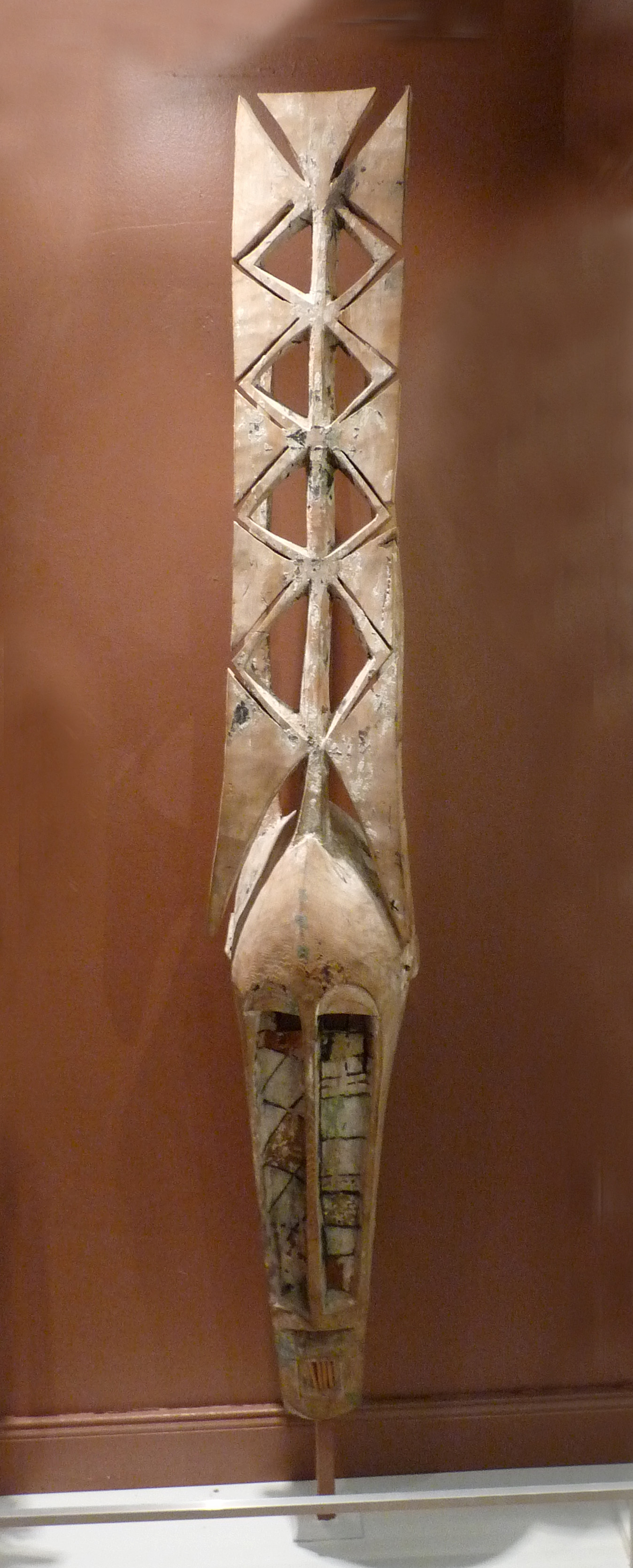
The blacksmith clan's mask, brought out for important ceremonies. Originally painted in bright colors, it gradually loses this vibrancy because it is washed completely after use.

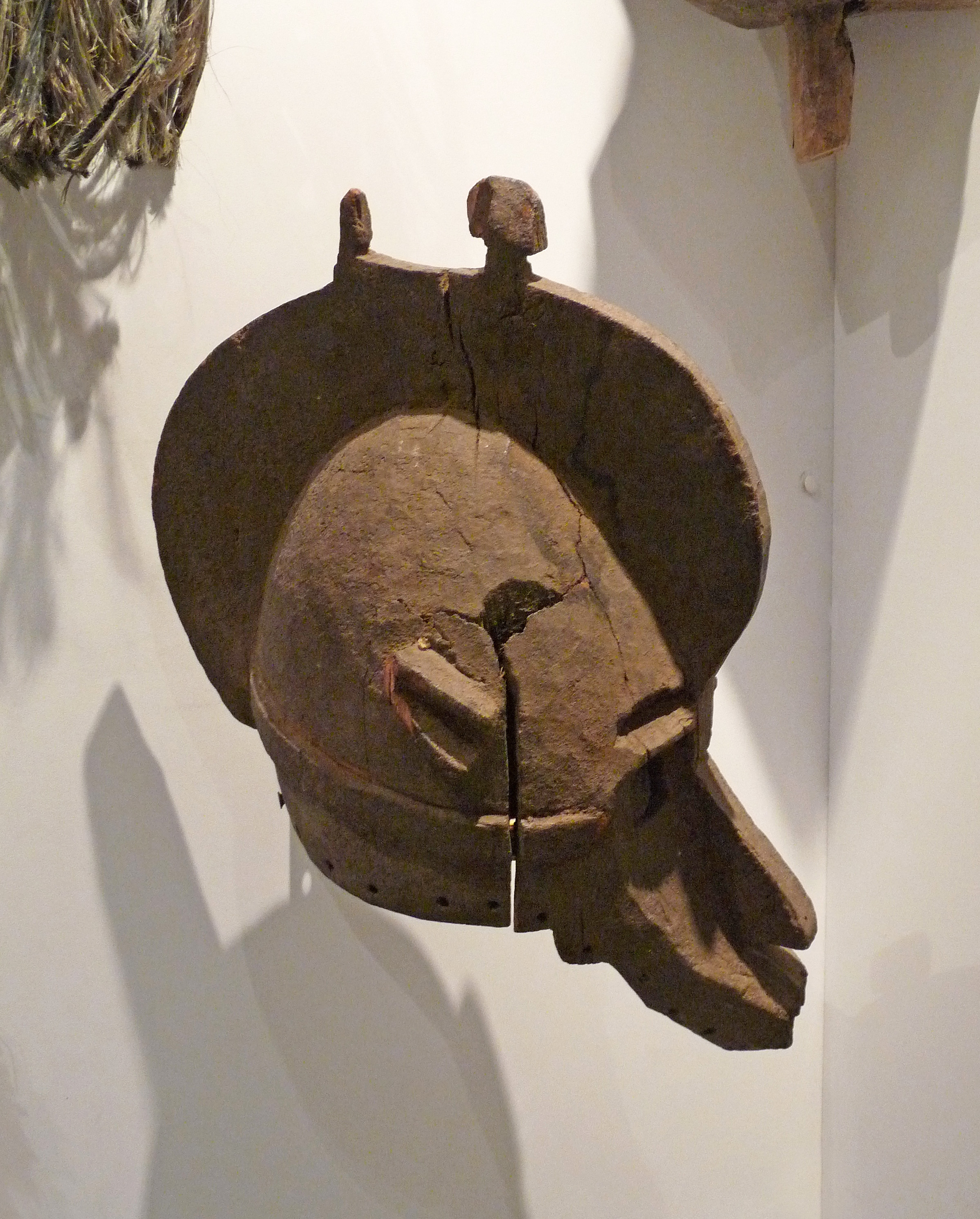
Bobo helmet mask. Burkina Faso. Wood, pigments.

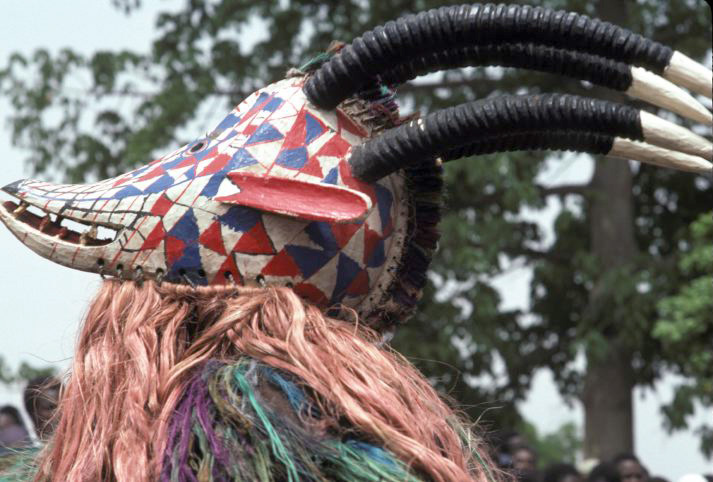
Southern Bobo antelope mask
