= Kono language (Sierra Leone) =

Language of Sierra Leone

Kɔnɔ
- Native to: Sierra Leone
- Region: East
- Ethnicity: Kono people
- Native speakers: 320,000 (2019)
- Language family: Mande: Western Mande; Central; Manding–Jogo; Manding–Vai; Vai–Kono; Kɔnɔ

Language codes
- ISO 639-3: kno
- Glottolog: kono1268

The Kono language (Kɔnɔ) is a language spoken in Sierra Leone by the Kono people. The Kono District is situated in the Eastern Province of Sierra Leone and contains 14 chiefdoms, each headed by a Paramount Chief. The language varies slightly between chiefdoms.

Kono distinguishes high tone and low tone on syllables:

tone	word	meaning
high	/kɔ́ɔ́/	'to mature'
low	/kɔ̀ɔ̀/	'rice'

== Sources ==
- Chiefdom Map of Sierra Leone: OCHA Humanitarian Information Centre and Sierra Leone Information Service, 2001. .
