= Mwan language =

Mande language spoken in Ivory Coast

Mwan
- Region: Ivory Coast
- Native speakers: 20,000 (2012)
- Language family: Niger–Congo: Mande; Eastern Mande; Southeastern; Nwa–Beng; Mwa–Wan; Mwan

Language codes
- ISO 639-3: moa
- Glottolog: mwan1250

Mwan (Mwa, Mouan, Muan, Muana, Mona) is a Mande language of Ivory Coast.
