= Blacksmiths of western Africa =

History of Blacksmiths in West Africa

The history of blacksmithing in West Africa dates back to around 1500 BCE, marking the emergence of skilled artisans whose mastery of ironworking was both revered and feared across the region. Blacksmiths held a unique position in West African societies, often perceived as possessing magical abilities due to their expertise in transforming metal. Their craft, critical to the development of tools, weapons, and ceremonial objects, was essential to the social and economic growth of various West African civilizations. As a result, blacksmiths were not only integral to the survival and advancement of their communities but also occupied high social statuses. These ironworking societies include the Mandé peoples of Mali and the Bamana. In some cultures, their skills were linked to spiritual practices and religious beliefs, particularly in the Yoruba culture, where the god Ogun, associated with iron and war, played a central role in their mythology. Blacksmiths in these societies were often part of endogamous castes, with knowledge and skills passed down through generations, ensuring the continuation of this vital craft.

== Nigeria ==
The Nok people of Nigeria show the art of blacksmiths, which date back to the sixth century BC. Ironworking made farming, hunting, and war much more efficient. Iron allowed for greater growth in societies. With the ability to support larger communities came social growth and the development of large kingdoms, which spread across Western Africa.

Throughout Nigeria two more very important West African civilizations arose. The Ife and the Oyo people of Yorubaland are very similar in their spiritual and ritual beliefs. Both base their existence around ironworking. To these African civilizations, iron had become the key to their development and survival, and it was worshiped as such. The Ife and Oyo people believe that the blacksmith has the power to express the spirit of Ogun, the god of iron, because they create iron, which is the foundation for their survival.

=== Spirituality and religion ===
==== Ogun, the god of iron ====
Ogun, the god of iron, is one of the pantheon of "orisa" traditionally worshipped by the Yoruba of Nigeria. Ogun is the god of iron and metalworking and was himself a user of iron as a blacksmith and metal worker. In Yoruba the use of “O” means “a spiritual force has mastered a particular form of wisdom” (Fatunmbi). Ogun therefore means the survival through assertive and aggressive action that is directed toward maintaining survival (Fatunmbi). Most of Nigeria's numerous ethnic cultures have a god of iron and metalworking in their traditional religion.

== Mande blacksmiths ==
The Mande blacksmiths hold important positions in society. Blacksmiths are often called upon by the chief for guidance in major decisions regarding the village. The power of the blacksmith is thought to be so great that they are also feared. Mande Blacksmiths control a force called nyama. This means that they control all energy and power in the village as well as the makeup and workings of the Mande society. The ability to control such a force is not given to just anyone. A single family in the village is designated to produce blacksmiths. The boys from that family are taught the daliluw, “the secret knowledge about the use and nature of nyama”.

“Nyama is the foundation that nourishes the institution of smithing, so that it may nourish society, is the simple axiom that knowledge can be power when properly articulated…. One must first possess it (nyama) in substantial amounts and then acquire the knowledge to manipulate and direct it to capitalize on its potential benefits. Acts that are difficult or dangerous—like hunting, or smelting, and forging iron—demand that a greater responsibility of energy and a higher degree of knowledge be possessed by the actor (Perani, Smith 1998: 71).

They begin training at an early age, as an apprentice in order to master the techniques of blacksmithing by the time they reach adulthood and become Mande blacksmiths.

== Bamana society ==
The Bamana society is very similar to the Mande. Bamana society is also endogamous, so blacksmith families are the only blacksmiths in the village and they hold a very high status, due to the extreme power and responsibility that they possess. Bamana Blacksmiths are also experts in divination, amulet making, as well as the practice of medicines due to their extensive knowledge of the Spirit of Ogun. Bamana Blacksmiths are responsible with the well being of the villagers and the safety of the village. This power like the Mande is driven by their control over nyama.

The Bamana training of young blacksmiths lasts about eight years. After completion of the apprenticeship the young blacksmith is ready to begin forging tools, weapons, and ritual masks and staffs, used for ceremonial purposes. “When used actively and sacrificed to, iron staffs continue to gain and radiate power, the power to protect, cure, fight, honor, lead, and repel” (Perani, Smith 1998: 71-72).

== Numu blacksmith castes and languages ==
In much of West Africa, blacksmiths form castes, called numu in Mande. Because these castes are endogamous (they only marry within the group), they have in several instances become distinct ethnic groups, which when separated from their parent group have even developed distinct languages spoken only by blacksmiths. The best-known of these is Ligbi; others include Tonjon, Natioro, Somyev, and in eastern Africa, Ndo.
