= Wan language =

Mande language spoken in Ivory Coast

Wan
- Nwa
- Region: Ivory Coast
- Native speakers: (22,000 cited 1993)
- Language family: Niger–Congo: Mande; Eastern Mande; Southeastern; Nwa–Beng; Mwa–Wan; Wan

Language codes
- ISO 639-3: wan
- Glottolog: wann1242

Wan, or Nwa, is a Mande language of Ivory Coast. Dialects are Miamu and Kemu.
