= Beng language =

Mande language of Ivory Coast

Beng
- Ngain
- Region: Ivory Coast
- Native speakers: (17,000 cited 1993)
- Language family: Niger–Congo: Mande; Eastern Mande; South(east)ern; Nwa–Beng?; Gban–Beng?; Beng

Language codes
- ISO 639-3: Either: nhb – Beng gnj – Ngen
- Glottolog: beng1291 Bengic

Beng or Ben is a Mande language of Ivory Coast. The Ngen dialect, perhaps a closely related language, is spelled various ways, including Gan, Ngain, Ngan, Ngen, Ngin, and Nguin.

Paperno describes Beng and Gbin as two primary branches of Southern Mande.
