= Soninke language =

Mande language spoken in West Africa

Soninke
- Sooninkanxanne سࣷونِکَنْخَنّࣹ
- Native to: Mali, Senegal, Ivory Coast, Gambia, Mauritania, Guinea-Bissau, Guinea, Ghana, Burkina Faso
- Region: West Africa
- Ethnicity: Soninke
- Native speakers: 2.3 million (2017–2021)
- Language family: Niger–Congo?: Mande; Western; Northwestern; Soninke–Bobo; Soninke–Bozo; Soninke
- Dialects: Azer
- Writing system: Latin; Arabic (Ajami); N'ti script

Official status
- Official language in: Mali

Language codes
- ISO 639-2: snk
- ISO 639-3: snk
- Glottolog: soni1259

The Soninke language (Soninke: Sooninkanxanne, سࣷونِکَنْخَنّࣹ), also known as Serakhulle or Azer or Maraka, is a Mande language spoken by the Soninke people of West Africa. The language has an estimated 2.3 million speakers, primarily located in Mali and Mauritania, and also (in order of numerical importance of the communities) in Senegal, Ivory Coast, The Gambia, Guinea-Bissau, and Guinea. It is a national language of Mauritania, Mali, Senegal and The Gambia.

== Phonology ==
=== Consonants ===
		Labial	Alveolar	Palatal	Velar	Uvular	Glottal
Nasal		⟨m⟩ m	⟨n⟩ n	⟨ñ⟩ ɲ	⟨ŋ⟩ ŋ		
Stop and Affricate	voiceless	⟨p⟩ p	⟨t⟩ t	⟨c⟩ t͡ʃ	⟨k⟩ k	⟨q⟩ q	
Stop and Affricate	voiced	⟨b⟩ b	⟨d⟩ d	⟨j⟩ d͡ʒ	⟨g⟩ ɡ		
Fricative		⟨f⟩ f	⟨s⟩ s		⟨x⟩ x ~ χ		⟨h⟩ h
Trill			⟨r⟩ r				
Approximant		⟨w⟩ w	⟨l⟩ l	⟨y⟩ j			

=== Vowels ===
	Front	Central	Back
Close	i iː		u uː
Close-mid	e eː		o oː
Open		a aː	

Long vowels are written double: aa, ee, ii, oo, uu.

== Dialects ==
Dialects of Soninke include the Berber-inflected Azer dialect.
