= Tura language =

Mande language of Ivory Coast

Tura
- Wɛɛn
- Region: Ivory Coast
- Native speakers: 67,000 (2017)
- Language family: Niger–Congo: Mande; Eastern Mande; Southeastern; Mano–Dan; Guro–Dan; Tura–Dan; Tura
- Dialects: Naò; Boo; Yiligele; Gwéò; Wáádú; Guse

Language codes
- ISO 639-3: neb
- Glottolog: tour1242

Tura (Toura) is a stable Mande language of Ivory Coast. Dialects are Naò, Boo, Yiligele, Gwéò, Wáádú, Guse. Its speakers, the Tura people, live primarily in the Biankouma Department, a mountainous area in the western Ivory Coast, although many of the speakers moved to the urban areas of Abidjan and Yamoussoukro, spreading its overall prevalence.
