= Guro language =

Mande language spoken in Ivory Coast

Guro
- Kweni
- Region: Ivory Coast
- Native speakers: 500,000 (2012)
- Language family: Niger–Congo: Mande; Eastern Mande; Southeastern; Mano–Dan; Guro–Dan; Guro–Yaure; Guro

Language codes
- ISO 639-3: goa
- Glottolog: guro1248

Guro (Gouro), also known as Kweni (Kwéndré) and Lo, is a Southern Mande language spoken by approximately a million people in Ivory Coast, primarily in the areas of Haut-Sassandra and Marahoue, and the Goh.

== Writing system ==
Guro alphabet (2008)
a	an	b	bh	c	d	e	ɛ	ɛn	f	g	i	in	ɩ	j	k	kp	l	m	n	nw	ny	o	ɔ	ɔn	p	s	t	u	un	ʋ	w	y	z
