= Yaure language =

Mande language spoken in Ivory Coast

Yaure
- Region: Ivory Coast
- Native speakers: 40,000 (2012)
- Language family: Niger–Congo: Mande; Eastern Mande; Southeastern; Mano–Dan; Guro–Dan; Guro–Yaure; Yaure
- Dialects: Klan; Yaan; Taan; Yoo; Bhoo

Language codes
- ISO 639-3: yre
- Glottolog: yaou1238

Yaure (Yaouré, Yohowré, Youré) is a Mande language of Ivory Coast. Dialects are Klan, Yaan, Taan, Yoo, Bhoo.
