= Gban language =

Mande language spoken in Ivory Coast

Gban
- Region: Ivory Coast
- Native speakers: 60,000 (2012)
- Language family: Niger–Congo: Mande; Eastern Mande; Southeastern; Nwa–Beng; Gban–Beng; Gban

Language codes
- ISO 639-3: ggu
- Glottolog: gagu1242

Gban, or Gagu (Gagou), is a Mande language of Ivory Coast. Dialects are N’da, Bokwa, Bokabo, Tuka.
