= Mande languages =

Language family of West Africa

Mande
- Geographic distribution: West Africa
- Ethnicity: Mandé peoples
- Linguistic classification: Niger–Congo?: Mande
- Proto-language: Proto-Mande
- Subdivisions: Western Mande; Eastern Mande

Language codes
- ISO 639-5: dmn
- Glottolog: mand1469
- Linguasphere: 00-
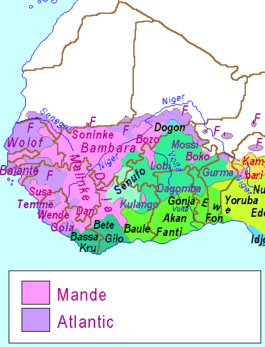

The Mande languages are a family of languages spoken in several countries in West Africa by the Mandé peoples. They include Maninka (Malinke), Mandinka, Soninke, Bambara, Kpelle, Jula (Dioula), Bozo, Mende, Susu, and Vai. There are around 60 to 75 languages spoken by around 60 million people, chiefly in Burkina Faso, Mali, Senegal, The Gambia, Guinea, Guinea-Bissau, Sierra Leone, Liberia, Ivory Coast (Côte d'Ivoire) and also in southern Mauritania, northern Ghana, northwestern Nigeria and northern Benin.

The Mande languages show a few lexical similarities with the Atlantic–Congo language family, so together they have been proposed as parts of a larger Niger–Congo language family since the 1950s. However, the Mande languages lack the noun-class morphology that is the primary identifying feature of the Atlantic–Congo languages. Accordingly, linguists increasingly treat Mande and Atlantic–Congo as independent language families. In the 2020s, new evidence was published in support of the genetic affinity between Mande and the Niger-Congo languages.

== History ==
Various opinions exist as to the age of the Mande languages.

Valentin Vydrin concluded that "the Mande homeland at the second half of the 4th millennium BC was located in Southern Sahara, somewhere to the North of 16° or even 18° of Northern latitude and between 3° and 12° of Western longitude.". That is now Mauritania and southern Western Sahara.

If Mande's linguistic affiliation were clearer that would help inform its history. For example, Joseph Greenberg suggested that the Niger-Congo group, which in his view includes the Mande language family, began to break up at around 7000 years BP. Its speakers would have practised a Neolithic culture, as indicated by the Proto-Niger-Congo words for "cow", "goat" and "cultivate".

== Early scholarship ==
The group was first recognized in 1854 by Sigismund Wilhelm Koelle, in his Polyglotta Africana. He mentioned 13 languages under the heading North-Western High-Sudan Family, or Mandéga Family of Languages. In 1901, Maurice Delafosse made a distinction of two groups. He speaks of a northern group mandé-tan and a southern group mandé-fu. The distinction was basically done only because the languages in the north use the expression tan for ten, and the southern languages use fu. In 1924, Louis Tauxier noted that the distinction is not well founded and there is at least a third subgroup he called mandé-bu. It was not until 1950 that André Prost supported that view and gave further details.

In 1958, Welmers published an article called "The Mande Languages," where he divided the languages into three subgroups: North-West, South and East. His conclusion was based on lexicostatistic research. Joseph Greenberg followed that distinction in his The Languages of Africa (1963). Long (1971) and Gérard Galtier (1980) follow the distinction into three groups but with notable differences.

== Classification ==
=== Relation to Niger-Congo ===
Mande does not share the morphology characteristic of most of the Niger–Congo family, such as the noun-class system. Accordingly, Dimmendaal (2008) argues that the evidence for inclusion is slim, and that for now Mande is best considered an independent family. The same view is held by Güldemann (2018).

Without definitively concluding that Mande is or is not a member of Niger–Congo, Vydrin (2016) notes that proto-Mande basic vocabulary fits relatively well with Niger–Congo, and that typological criteria such as the absence of a noun-class system should not be taken as probative; he notes that "If the position of Mande within Niger-Congo is confirmed... Mande will certainly represent the most ancient branching of the phylum". Blench regards it as an early branch that diverged before the noun-class morphology developed. Dwyer (1998) compared it with other branches of Niger–Congo and finds that they form a coherent family, with Mande being the most divergent of the branches he considered. A preliminary study from 2024 suggests that a relationship between the Mande and Atlantic-Congo branches is plausible based on reconstructed lexical items.

Pozdniakov and Vydrin (2026) identified 180 cognates between Proto-Mande and Proto-Bantu, ranked by reliability, alongside 27 additional Proto-Mande roots with cognates in other Niger-Congo families. Furthermore, the authors tentatively established regular sound correspondences for Proto-Mande and Proto-Bantu initial consonants, while advancing systematic arguments supporting a genealogical relationship between Mande and Bantu:

• In the basic vocabulary, the average cognacy rate of contemporary Mande languages with Proto-Bantu is higher than the rate for other families whose membership in the Niger-Congo macrofamily is uncontested.

• In the basic vocabulary, the number of phonetic similarities actually observed far exceeds the number expected on the basis of random coincidence alone.

• In the basic vocabulary, Proto-Bantu and Proto-Mande are considerably closer to each other than contemporary Bantu and Mande languages are.

• Phonetic correspondences between Proto-Bantu and Proto-Mande are not only regular, but also proportional, which excludes the possibility that they are merely fortuitous.

• In the basic vocabulary, the distribution of roots by their stability in the Mande family displays a strong positive correlation with their distribution in the other Niger-Congo families.

=== Internal classification ===
The diversity and depth of the Mande family is comparable to that of Indo-European. Eleven low-level branches of Mande are nearly universally accepted: Southern Mande (Dan etc.), Eastern Mande (Bisa, Boko etc.), Samogo, Bobo, Soninke–Bozo, Southwestern Mande (Mende, Kpelle, Loma etc.), Soso–Jalonke, Jogo, Vai–Kono, Mokole and Manding (Bambara, Djula etc.). It is also widely accepted that these form two primary branches, the first two as Southeastern Mande and the rest as Western Mande.

Most internal Mande classifications are based on lexicostatistics, for example, that based on the Swadesh list. An alternative classification from Kastenholz (1996) is based on lexical innovations and comparative linguistics. Kastenholz warns however that this is not based on objective criteria and thus is not a genealogical classification in the narrow sense. The following classification is a compilation of both.

- Mande
  - Southeast Mande
    - Southern Mande (Dan, Mah, etc.)
    - Eastern Mande (Bisa, Busa, etc.)
  - West Mande
    - Central West (Manding–Kpelle)
      - Central Mande
        - Jogo languages
        - Great Manding
          - Vai-Mokole
              - Vai–Kono
              - Mokole languages
          - Manding languages
      - Southwestern-Susu
        - Southwest Mande (Mende, Kpelle, etc.)
        - Susu–Yalunka
    - Northwest (Samogo–Soninke)
      - Northwest proper
        - Samogo languages
        - Bɔbɔ
        - Soninke–Bozo

== Morphosyntactic features ==
Mande languages do not have the noun-class system or verbal extensions of the Atlantic–Congo languages and for which the Bantu languages are so famous, but Bobo has causative and intransitive forms of the verb. Southwestern Mande languages and Soninke have initial consonant mutation. Plurality is most often marked with a clitic; in some languages, with tone, as for example in Sembla. Pronouns often have alienable–inalienable and inclusive–exclusive distinctions. Word order in transitive clauses is subject–auxiliary–object–verb–adverb. Mainly postpositions are used. Within noun phrases, possessives come before the noun, and adjectives and plural markers after the verb; demonstratives are found with both orders.

== Comparative vocabulary ==
Below is a sample basic vocabulary of reconstructed proto-forms:

Language	eye	ear	nose	tooth	tongue	mouth	blood	bone	tree	water	eat	name
Proto-Mande				*ɲíŋ	*lɛɓ̰́ Ṽ				*yíti			
Proto-West Mande		*túli	*sʸúN	*ɲíN	**nɛ̌N	*dá ~ ɗá	*jío ~ yío		*gúri ~ wúri	*jío ~ yío		*tɔ́ko
Proto-Manding (Mandekan)	*nya	*tulo	*nun	*nyin	*nɛn(e)	*da	*joli	*kolo	*yiri	*ji	*domo(n)	*tɔgɔ
Proto-East Mande (Niger-Volta)	*jɛN (< *gɛN)	*toro	*N-jẽ	*soN(-ka)	*N-lɛ	*lɛ	*(N-)wa(-ru)	*(N-)gero	*li/*da	*jiN	*be(-le)	*tɔ
Proto-South Mande	*yũ̀ã́	*tɔ́lɔ́ŋ	*yṹã̄	*sɔ̃̀ɛ̃́	*nã̄nɛ̃́	*ɗé	*yɔ̃̀mũ̄	*wɔ̃́nɛ̃́	*yílí	*yí	*ɓɪ̀lɪ̀	*tɔ́

Below are some cognates from D. J. Dwyer (1988) (⟨j⟩ is [dʲ] or [d͡ʒ]):

GLOSS	PROTO- MANDÉ	Manding	Kono-Vai	Susu	Mandé (SW)	Soninké	Sembla	Bobo	San	Busa	Mano	Dan	Guro	Mwa
'mouth'	*da	da	da	dɛ	la	laqqe	jo	do	le	le	le	Di	le	le, di
'saliva'	*da-yi	da-ji	da-	sɛ-ye	la-yi	laxan-ji	jon-fago	dibe	se	le-i	le-yi	Di-li	leri	liri
'water'	*yi	je	yi	yi	ya	ji	jo	ji, zio	mun	i	yi	yi	yi	yi
'breast'	*n-koŋ	sin	susu	sisi	ŋeni	konbe	kye	ɲiŋi	ɲo	ɲo	ɲoŋ	ɲoŋ	ɲoŋ	ɲoŋ
'milk'	*n-kon-yi	nɔnɔ	susu-ji	xin-yɛ	gen-iya	-xatti	kye-n-dyo	n-yan-niŋi		n-yo-			n-yoŋ-yi	n-yoŋ-yi
'goat'	*bo(re)	ba	ba		ɓoli	sugo	bi	gwa	bwe	ble	bɔ	bɔ	bori	bɔ
'buck'	*bore-guren	ba-koro				diggeh		gu-gura		ble-sa	bɔ-gon	bɔ-gon	gyagya	bɔ-guren
'sheep'	*saga	saga	bara-wa	yexe	ɓara	jaxe	sega	sɛge	sere	sa	baa	bla	bera	bla
'ram'	*saga-guren	saga-koro				jaxampade	kekyere	si-gula	da-gu		bla-gon	bra-gon	bla-gure	
'head'	*	Koun-kolo				yin-kola								

Note that in these cognates:

- 'saliva' = 'mouth'+'water'
- 'milk' = 'breast'+'water'
- 'buck (he-goat)' = 'goat'+'male'
- 'ram' = 'sheep'+'male'

== Numerals ==
Comparison of numerals in individual languages:

Classification	Language	1	2	3	4	5	6	7	8	9	10
Bissa	Bissa (Bisa)	díí	píjà	kakʊ́	sɪ̀	sɔ́ɔ̀	sòàtɪ (5 + 1)	sáápra (5 + 2)	síɲe (2 x 4) ?	nɛfʊ̀ (10 -1) ?	bʊ̀
Busa	Boko	do	pla	ʔààɔ̃	sííɔ̃	sɔ́o	soolo (5 + 1)	sopla (5 + 2)	swaàɔ̃ (5 + 3)	kɛ̃̀okwi [ litː tear away 1 (from) 10 ]	kwi
Busa	Bokobaru (Zogbẽ)	do	pláa	ʔààɡɔ̃	sííɡɔ̃	sɔ́ɔ́ro	swɛ́ɛ̀do (5 + 1)	swɛ́ɛ̀pláa (5 + 2)	sɔ́rààɡɔ̃ (5 + 3)	kɛ̃́ndo (10–1)	kurì
Busa	Illo Busa	do	pia	ʔààkɔ̃	ʃííkɔ̃	sɔ́o	sóodo (5 + 1)	soopia (5 + 2)	swààkɔ̃ (5 + 3)	kĩ́ṇdokwi [litː tear away 1 (from) 10]	kwi
Busa	Busa	do	pla	ʔààkɔ̃	sííkɔ̃	sɔ́ɔ́ro	súddo (5 + 1)	súppla (5 + 2)	sɔ́rààkɔ̃ (5 + 3)	kɛ̃́ndo (10–1)	kurì
Kyanga	Kyanga (Kyenga) (1)	dúú	fʸáā	ˀāàː	ʃíí	sɔ́ɔ́rū	sɔ̄ɔ̄dū (5 + 1)	sʷāhʸáā (5 + 2)	sōōwà (5 + 3)	sòòʃí (5 + 4)	kōōrì
Kyanga	Kyanga (Kyenga) (2)	dūː	fʲâː	ʔàː	ʃíː	sɔ̂ːwû	sɔ̂ːdū (5 + 1)	sɔ̂ːfʲá (5 + 2)	sōːuwà (5 + 3)	sōwēʃíː (5 + 4)	kōːlì
Kyanga	Kyenga (3)	do	hia / fia	ʔà	ʃí	sɔɔlu	sɔɔdu (5 + 1)	sɔɔhia (5 + 2)	soowà (5 + 3)	sooʃí (5 + 4)	korì
Kyanga	Shanga	do	ʍa	ʔà	ʃí	sɔ́ɔ	sɔbodo (5 + 1)	sɔhia (5 + 2)	sɔboʔà (5 + 3)	sɔdoʃí (5 + 4)	wókòì
Samo	Matya Samo	ɡɔ̀rɔ́	prá	tjɔwɔ	sí	sɔ́rɔ́	sɛ̀rɛ́ (5 + 1)	tjʊ́sʊ́ (5 + 2)	tjisí (2 x 4)	ménaŋɡɔrɔ (10–1)	flè / fʊ̀
Samo	Maya Samo	dɛ́nɛ́	fúrá	kàakú	síirí	sɔ́ɔrɔ́	sɔ̀rɔ̀ (5 + 1)	sɔ̀frá (5 + 2)	cíɡísí (2 x 4 ) ?	sóosí (5 + 4) ?	bù
Guro-Tura	Guro	dʊ	fíé	yaá	zĩ̀ɛ̃́	sólú	sʊɛdʊ / sʊɛlʊ (5 + 1)	sʊlàyíé (5 + 2)	sʊlaá (5 + 3)	sʊlàzĩ̀ɛ̃́ (5 + 4)	vu
Guro-Tura	Yaouré	tʊ̀	fli̋	yaaɡa	sĩjɛ̃ = sĩɟɛ̃ or sĩd͡ʒɛ̃	sóolu	ʃɛ́dʊ (5 + 1)	sɔ́ravli (5 + 2)	sɔ́ra (5 + 3)	sɔ́rasiɛ̃ (5 + 4)	fù
Guro-Tura	Mann (Mano)	doó	pèèlɛ	yààka	yììsɛ	sɔ́ɔ́li	sáláádo (5 + 1)	sálápèèlɛ (5 + 2)	sálàka (5 + 3)	sɛ́lɛ̀ìsɛ (5 + 4)	vũ̀
Nwa-Ben	Beng	do	plaŋ	ŋaŋ	siéŋ	sɔ́ŋ	sɔ́do (5 + 1)	sɔ́pla (5 + 2)	sɔ́wa (5 + 3)	sisi (5 + 4)	ebu
Nwa-Ben	Gagu	dò	fɪ́n	yía	zié	súu	sɛ́dò (5 + 1)	sɛ́fɪ́n (5 + 2)	sɛà (5 + 3)	tízie (5 + 4)	vù
Nwa-Ben	Mwan (Muan)	do	plɛ	yaɡa	yiziɛ	sóó	srɔádo (5 + 1)	srɔáplɛ (5 + 2)	srɔ́a (5 + 3)	srɔáyiziɛ (5 + 4)	vu
Nwa-Ben	Wan	do	pilɔŋ	ʔã́	sijá	sɔ̀lú	wáŋ́	séaʔã́ (5 + 2)	séjãŋ́ (5 + 3)	sɔlásijá (5 + 4)	sɔ́jɔlú
Jogo-Jeri	Jalkunan	dúlì	fìlɑ̀	siɡ͡bù	nɑ̄ːnī	sōːlō	mìːlù	mɑ̀ɑ́lɑ̀	mɑ̀sīɡ͡bū (5 + 3)	mɑ́nɑ̄nì (5 + 4)	tɑ̄
Jogo-Jeri	Ligbi	díén / díyé	fàlà / fàlá	sèɡ͡bá / siɡ͡bá	náánè / náani	sóólò / sóolo	mɔ̀ɔ̀dó / mooró (5 + 1)	màúlà / mafála (5 + 2)	másèɡ͡bá / masiɡ͡bá (5 + 3)	màdááné / maráni (5 + 4)	táàn / táa
Manding	Marka (Dafing)	kyen / kyeren	fila / fila	saba / saba	nɛi / naani	luu / luuru	wɔɔ / wɔɔrɔ	wəna / wonla	sii / siɡi	konon / kondon	tan / tan
Manding	Bambara	kélen [kélẽ́]	fìla [fìlá]	sàba [sàbá]	náani [náːní]	dúuru [dúːrú]	wɔ́ɔrɔ [wɔ́ːrɔ́]	wólonwula [wólṍwulá]	sèɡin [sèɡĩ́]	kɔ̀nɔntɔn [kɔ̀nɔ̃̀tɔ̃́]	tán [tã́]
Manding	Jula (1)	kelen [ké.lẽ́]	filà [fì.là] ~ [flà]	sàbà [sà.bà]	nàànìn [nàːnĩ̀]	dùùrù [dù.ɾù]	wɔ̀ɔ̀rɔ̀ [wɔ̀ːɾɔ́]	wolon fìlà [wò.lṍ.fi.̀là]	sieɡi [sí.é.ɡí]	kɔ̀nɔ̀ndon [kɔ.̀nɔ̃.ⁿdṍ]	tan [tã́]
Manding	Jula (2)	kelen [kélẽ́]	fila [fìlá] / fla [flá]	saba [sàbá]	naani [náːní]	looru [lóːrú]	wɔɔrɔ [wɔ́ːrɔ́]	wolonfila [wólṍfìlá] / wolonfla	seɡin [sèɡĩ́] / seeɡi [sèːɡí]	kɔnɔntɔn [kɔ̀nɔ̃̀tɔ̃́]	tan [tã́]
Manding	Sankaran Maninka	kɛlɛn	fila	sawa	naani	loolu / looli	wɔɔrɔn	wɔɔrɔn (fi)la	sen	konondo	tan
Manding	Mahou	kéléŋ	fyàà	sàwà	náání	lóó	wɔ́ɔ́lɔ́	wóóŋvyàà	sɛ́ɲíŋ	kɔ̀ɔ̀nŋdɔ́ŋ	táŋ
Manding	Mandinka	kíliŋ	fula	saba	náani	lúulu	wóoro	wórówula	sáyi	konónto	táŋ
Manding	Xaasonga	kilin	fula	saba	naani	luulu	wooro	woorowula	saɡi	xononto	tan
Mokole	Kakabe	kélen	fìla	sàba	náani	lɔ́ɔlu	wɔ́ɔrɔ	wɔ́rɔwila (6 + 1)	sáɡin	kɔ̀nɔntɔ	tán
Mokole	Kuranko	kelen	fila	sawa / saba	nani	loli	wɔrɔ	wɔrɔnfila (6 + 1) ?	seɡin	kɔnɔnt	tan
Mokole	Lele	kelɛŋ	fela	sawa	nani	luuli	wɔɔrɔ	wɔrɔŋ kela (6 + 1)	seŋ	kɔnɔndɔ	taŋ
Vai-Kono	Kono	ncélen / ncéle, dɔ́ndo	fèa	sàwa	náani	dúʔu	wɔ́ɔlɔ	wɔ́nfèa / ɔ́ɱfèa	séi / séin	kɔ̀nɔ́ntɔn	tán
Vai-Kono	Vai	lɔ̀ndɔ́	fɛ̀(ʔ)á	sàk͡pá	náánì	sóó(ʔ)ú	sɔ̂ŋ lɔ̀ndɔ́ (5 + 1)	sɔ̂ŋ fɛ̀(ʔ)á (5 + 2)	sɔ̂ŋ sàk͡pá (5 + 3)	sɔ̂ŋ náánì (5 + 4)	tâŋ
Susu-Yalunka	Susu	kérén [kɛ́rɛ̃́]	fìrín [fìrĩ́]	sàxán [sàxã́]	náání	súlí	sénní [sẽní] (5 + 1)	sólófèré (5 + 2)	sólómásàxán (5 + 3)	sólómánáání (5 + 4)	fuú
Susu-Yalunka	Yalunka (1)	kèdé	fìríŋ	sàkáŋ	nànì	sùlù	sènì (5 + 1)	fòlófɛ̀rɛ́ (5 + 2)	fòlòmàsàkáŋ (5 + 3)	fòlòmànànì (5 + 4)	fù
Susu-Yalunka	Yalunka (Jalonke) (2)	keden	fidin	saxan	naani	suuli	sɛnni (5 + 1)	solofɛdɛ (5 + 2)	solomasɛɡɛ (5 + 3)	solomanaani (5 + 4)	fuu
Kpelle	Guinea Kpelle	tááŋ	hvèèlɛ̌ / hvèèlɛ́	hààbǎ / hààbá	nááŋ́	lɔ́ɔ́lí	mɛ̀í dà (5 + 1)	mɛ̀ì hvéélɛ̀ (5 + 2)	mɛ̀ì háábà (5 + 3)	mɛ̀ì nááŋ́ (5 + 4)	pòǔ
Kpelle	Liberia Kpelle	taaŋ / tɔnɔ / dɔnɔ	feerɛ	saaɓa	náaŋ	nɔ́ɔlu / lɔ́ɔlu	mɛi da (5 + 1)	mɛi feerɛ (5 + 2)	mɛi saaɓa (5 + 3)	mɛi náaŋ (5 + 4)	puu
Mende-Loma	Looma (Toma) (1)	ɡílàɡ	félé(ɡɔ̀)	sáwà(ɡɔ̀)	náánĩ̀(ɡɔ̀)	dɔ́ɔ́lù̀(ɡɔ̀)	dòzìtà (5 + 1)	dɔ́fèlà (5 + 2)	dɔ́sáwà (5 + 3)	tàwù̀(ɡɔ̀) (10–1) ?	pù̀(ɡɔ̀)
Mende-Loma	Loma (2)	ɡila	feleɡɔ	saaɡɔ	naaɡɔ	dooluo	dɔzita (5 + 1)	dɔfela (5 + 2)	dɔsava (5 + 3)	taawu (10–1) ?	puu
Mende-Loma	Bandi (1)	ìtá(ŋ), hítà(ŋ)	fèlé(ŋ)	sàwá(ŋ), sàá(ŋ)	náánì(ŋ)	ndɔ̀ɔ́lú(ŋ)	nɡɔ̀hítá(ŋ) (5 + 1)	ŋɡɔ̀félà(ŋ) (5 + 2)	ŋɡɔ̀hák͡pá(ŋ), ŋɡwahák͡pá(ŋ) (5+ 4)	tààwú(ŋ), tààvú(ŋ) (10–1) ?	pû(ŋ), púù(ŋ)
Mende-Loma	Bandi (2)	iitá	feelé	saawá	naáni	ndɔɔ́lu	nɡɔhíta (5 + 1)	nɡɔféla (5 + 2)	nɡwahák͡pa (5 + 3)	taávu (10–1) ?	púu
Mende-Loma	Loko (1)	íla(ŋ)	félé(ŋ), féé(ŋ)	sáwá(ŋ), cáwá(ŋ)	nááí(ŋ)	ńdɔu(ŋ)	ŋɡɔhita (5 + 1)	ŋɡɔfɛla (5 + 2)	ŋɡɔsaak͡pa	karaabu, raabu	puu(ŋ), kapuu(ŋ)
Mende-Loma	Loko (2)	ila	fele	itʃawa	naiŋ	ndɔu	nɡɔita (5 + 1)	nɡɔfla (5 + 2)	nɡɔsaɡ͡ba (5 + 3)	karabu (10–1) ?	kapu
Mende-Loma	Mende	yilá / itáá	felé	sawá	nááni	lɔ́ɔ́lu	wɔ́íta (5 + 1)	wɔ́fíla (5 + 2)	wáyák͡pá (5 + 3)	táálú (10–1) ?	puú
Samogo	Duungooma	sɔʔi	fíʔi	ʒiʔi	naai	nũ	tũmɛ̃	ɲɛ̃ːnũ	ŋaai	kleːlo	ceũ
Samogo	Dzùùngoo	sōː ́ / sōːrē	fíː / fíːkí	ʒìːɡī ́	nàːlẽ́	nũ̀	tsũ̀mɛ̃̄ ́	ɲɛ̃̀ːnṹ	ŋáːlõ̀	kjèːrṍ	tsjéù
Samogo	Jowulu (Jo)	tẽẽna	fuuli	bʒei	pʃɪrɛᶦ	tãã	tãmãnɪ (5 + 1)	dʒɔ̃mpʊn (3 + 4)	fulpʊn (2 x 4)	tẽmpʊn (5 + 4)	bʒĩĩ
Samogo	Seeku	swɛ̃̄	fĩ́	ʃwɛ̀	nàà	nɔ̄	tsìì	ɲɛ̀ɛ̀	kàà	kùòmɛ̀	tó
Soninke-Bobo	Konabéré	tálɪ̄	pálà	sǎ	nìã̄	kʊ̄	kʊ̀tã́nɪ̀ (5 + 1)	kʊ̀rʊ̀párá (5 + 2)	kʊ̀rʊ̀sɔ̄ʊ̀ (5 + 3)	kʊ̀rʊ̀nɔ̂ŋ (5 + 4)	m̥ḿ̩
Soninke-Bobo	Southern Bobo Madare	tèlé	plá	sáà	náà	kóò	kònálá (5 + 1)	kòk͡pùrá (5 + 2)	kórósɔ̃̌ (5 + 3)	kórónɔ̃̌ (5 + 4)	fʊ̃̀
Soninke-Bobo	Hainyaxo Bozo (Kelenga)	sâ:nà	fíenù	sí:yù	ná:nà	kɔ́lɔ́hɔ̀	tú:mì	dʒíenì	sɛ́kì	káfì	tã̄
Soninke-Bobo	Tièmà-Cièwè Bozo	sàn:á	pẽ̀ːndé	sì:yé	nà:rá	kɔ̀lɔ́	tù:mì	dʒiènĩ́	tʃèkí	kìáwí	tá
Soninke-Bobo	Tiéyaxo Bozo (Tigemaxo) (1)	sáná	fẽ́:ndè	sí:yò	kɔ́lɔ̀	kɔ́lɔ̀	tú:mĩ̀	dʒê:nì	sɛ̄kī	kìáwì	tã́
Soninke-Bobo	Tiéyaxo Bozo (2)	sanna / kuɔn	fendeen / pendeen	siiyon	naaran	kɔlɔn	tuumi	jeeni	sekiin	kiawi	tan
Soninke-Bobo	Jenaama Bozo (1)	sànːá	pẽ̀ndéː	síkɛ̃̀ũ	nàtã́	kɔ̀ːɡṍ	tǔːmí	yíèní	sèkːí	kàpːí	tʃɛ́mí
Soninke-Bobo	Jenaama Bozo (2)	sanna	pende	sikɛũ / siɡɛũ	nataũ	kɔɡõ	tuumi	yeeni	seki	kapi	tʃɛmi / tʃami
Soninke-Bobo	Soninke	bàanè	fíllò / filːi	síkkò / sikːi	náɣátò / naɣati	káráɡò / karaɡi	tṹmù / tũmi	ɲérù / ɲeri	séɡù / seɡi	kábù / kabi	tã́mú / tãmi

== Proto-language ==
Proto-Mande is the reconstructed hypothetical ancestor of all the modern Mande languages, which number over 60. The reconstruction of Proto-Mande is an ongoing effort, and it has not yet reached the same level of comparative depth as some other proto-languages, such as Proto-Bantu. The time depth of the Mande family is estimated to be 5,300 to 5,500 years.

The following is a recently proposed tentative consonant system:

Proto-Mande initial consonants
		Labial	Coronal	Palatal	Velar	Labial-velar
Plosive	voiceless	*p	*t		*k	*kp
Plosive	voiced	*b	*d	*ɟ	*g	*gb
Implosive		*ɓ^{1}	*ɗ^{1}		*ɠ	
Fricative		*f	*s	*x	*xw	
Approximant		*w^{2}		*j^{2}	*ɣ	*ɣw

1. /ɓ/ and /ɗ/ are realized as [m] and [n] before nasal vowels.
2. /j/ and /w/ are realized as [ɲ] and [ŋ] before vowels.

Proto-Mande had a consonant inventory that included stops, implosives, fricatives, and approximants. It likely lacked phonemic nasal consonants, instead having them as allophones of other sounds. The phonetic nasals [m] and [n] are analyzed as allophones of the implosives /ɓ/ and /ɗ/, while [ɲ] and [ŋ] were allophones of the approximants /j/ and /w/. These nasal allophones occurred when positioned next to nasalized vowels.

Nasals are broadly phonemic in modern Mande languages, but they tend to be allophonic in the Southern group; Vydrin argues this system is preserved from Proto-Mande. The proto-language's lack of phonemic nasal stops helps explain the absence or rarity of combinations of nasals with semi-closed vowels (e.g., *me, *ne, *ɲe, *mo, *no, *ɲo) in many Western Mande languages.

Below are the ancestral vowels, adapted from a reconstruction by Vydrin:

Proto-Mande Vowels
	Front		Central		Back	
	Oral	Nasal	Oral	Nasal	Oral	Nasal
Close	*i	*ĩ			*u	*ũ
Near-close	*ɪ				*ʊ	
Close-mid	*e	*ẽ			*o	*õ
Open-mid	*ɛ				*ɔ	
Open			*a	*ã		

Proto-Mande had 9 oral vowels, 5 nasal vowels, and a syllabic nasal, marked in the data as *N. Vowel length was also a contrastive feature. Proto-Mande, like its descendants, was certainly tonal, with a system that included two tones. Many modern languages have developed more than two tones, particularly the Southern Mande languages.

For a preliminary list of reconstructed lexical items, see List of Proto-Mande reconstructions.

Since 2024, Valentin Vydrin's Comparative lexical database of Mande languages is available on line (Vydrin 2026).

== See also ==
- List of Proto-Mande reconstructions (Wiktionary)
- List of Proto-West Mande reconstructions (Wiktionary)
- Manding languages
- Mandé
- Mende language
