= Ethnic groups in Sierra Leone =

Ethnic groups living within the country of Sierra Leone

The distribution of major ethnic groups within Sierra Leone.

Sierra Leone is home to around sixteen ethnic groups, each with its own language. In Sierra Leone, membership of an ethnic group often overlaps with a shared religious identity. According to the 2004 census Temne is the largest ethnic group in Sierra Leone.

== Ethnic groups and national politics ==
The largest contest within Sierra Leone's political culture centres upon the competition between the Mende in the south-east and the Temne people of the northwest of Sierra Leone.

== Ethnic groups ==
=== Temne ===
The largest group are the Temne, at 35.5% make up Sierra Leone's population. The Temne predominate in the Northern Province, Sierra Leone and the areas around the capital of Sierra Leone.

The vast majority of Temne are Muslim, and a small population practice Christianity.

The Temne are thought to have come from Futa Jallon, which is in present-day Guinea. They have strong relationship with the Fullaa and Susu they are also widely spread in West Africa, being the third African muslim group to accept Islam after the Fullaa and Medingo. Sierra Leone's former president Ernest Bai Koroma is the first ethnic Temne to be elected to the office. The majority of the Temne support the All People's Congress.

=== Mende ===
The second largest ethnic group in Sierra Leone is the Mende at 31.2% of Sierra Leone's population. The Mende predominate in the Southern Province and Eastern Sierra Leone (with the exception of Kono District).

The Mende are a Muslim majority group, though with a large Christian minority. The Mende, who are believed to be descendants of the Mane, originally occupied the Liberian hinterland. They began moving into Sierra Leone slowly and peacefully in the eighteenth century.

The vast majority of the Mende support the Sierra Leone People's Party (SLPP).

=== Limba ===
The third largest ethnic group are the Limba at around 6.4% of the population. The Limba are Indigenous people of Sierra Leone and speak various dialects of a language largely unrelated to other tribal languages in Sierra Leone. They are primarily found in the Northern Province, particularly in Bombali District, Koinadugu and Kambia District. During Sierra Leone's colonial era thousands of Limbas migrated to the capital city of Freetown and its Western Area. As a result, a significant number of Limbas can be found in Freetown and its surrounding Western Area. During the 16th, 17th, and 18th century, many Limba people were shipped to North America as slaves.

=== Fula ===
One of the biggest ethnic groups are the Fula at around 4.4% of the population. Descendants of seventeenth- and eighteenth-century Fulani migrant settlers from the [Fuuta Jaloo, Fuuta Tooro], regions of Guinea, Senegal, Mali, and Mauritania. The Sierra Leone Fula people settled in the Western Area region of Sierra Leone more than sixty years ago as settlers from mainly the Fuuta Jaloo Region that expanded to northern Sierra Leone (Kabala, Bombali)

The Sierra Leonean Fula are traditionally a nomadic, pastoralist, trading people, herding cattle, goats and sheep across the vast dry hinterlands of their domain, keeping somewhat separate from the local agricultural populations. Many of the large shopping centers in Sierra Leone are owned and run by the Fula community.

A significant number of the Sierra Leone Fula population are found in all regions of Sierra Leone as traders, and many live in middle-class homes. Because of their trading, the Fulas are found in nearly all parts of the country. Sierra Leone’s current Vice President, Dr. Juldeh Jalloh, is a Fula by tribe.

=== Mandingo ===
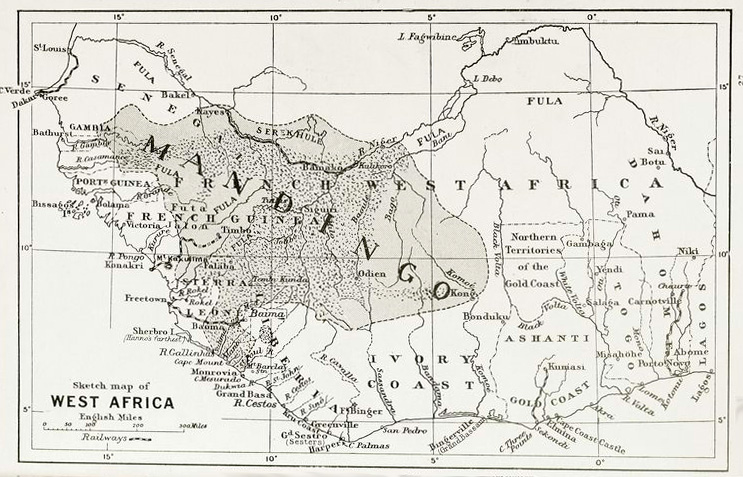
A map showing the regional distribution of the Mandinka across what are now multiple West African nations.

A significant ethnic group are the Mandingo (also known as Mandinka). They are descendants of traders from Guinea who migrated to Sierra Leone during the late nineteenth to mid-twentieth centuries. The Mandika are predominantly found in the east and the northern part of the country.

They predominate in the large towns, most notably Karina, in Bombali District in the north; Kabala and Falaba in Koinadugu District in the north; and Yengema, Kono District in the east of the country. Like the Fula, the Mandinka are virtually all Muslims. Sierra Leone's third president Ahmad Tejan Kabbah, and Sierra Leone's first Vice President Sorie Ibrahim Koroma were both ethnic Mandingo.

=== Kono ===
Next in proportion are the Kono, who live primarily in Kono District in Eastern Sierra Leone. The Kono are descendants of migrants from Guinea; today their workers are known primarily as diamond miners. The majority of the Kono ethnic group are Christians, though with an influential Muslim minority. Sierra Leone's former Vice-President Alhaji Samuel Sam-Sumana is an ethnic Kono.

=== Sierra Leone Creole (Krio) ===
The small but significant Creole or Krio people (descendants of freed African American, West Indian and Liberated African slaves who settled in Freetown between 1787 and about 1885) make up 1.3% of the population. They primarily occupy the capital city of Freetown and its surrounding Western Area. Krio culture reflects the Western culture and ideals within which many of their ancestors originated - they also had close ties with British officials and colonial administration during years of development.

The Krio have traditionally dominated Sierra Leone's judiciary and Freetown's elected city council. One of the first ethnic groups to become educated according to Western traditions, they have traditionally been appointed to positions in the civil service, beginning during the colonial years. They continue to be influential in the civil service. The Creoles are Christians.

=== Oku ===
The Oku people are the descendants of liberated muslim Yorubas from Southwest Nigeria, who were released from slave ships and resettled in Sierra Leone as Liberated Africans or came as settlers in the mid-19th century. The Oku people primarily reside in the communities of Fourah Bay, Fula Town, and Aberdeen in Freetown.

=== Kuranko ===
Other minority ethnic groups are the Kuranko, who are related to the Mandingo, and are largely Muslims. The Kuranko are believed to have begun arriving in Sierra Leone from Guinea in about 1600 and settled in the north, particularly in Koinadugu District.

The Kuranko are primarily farmers; leaders among them have traditionally held several senior positions in the Military. Sierra Leone current Finance Minister Kaifala Marah is an ethnic Kuranko.

=== Loko ===
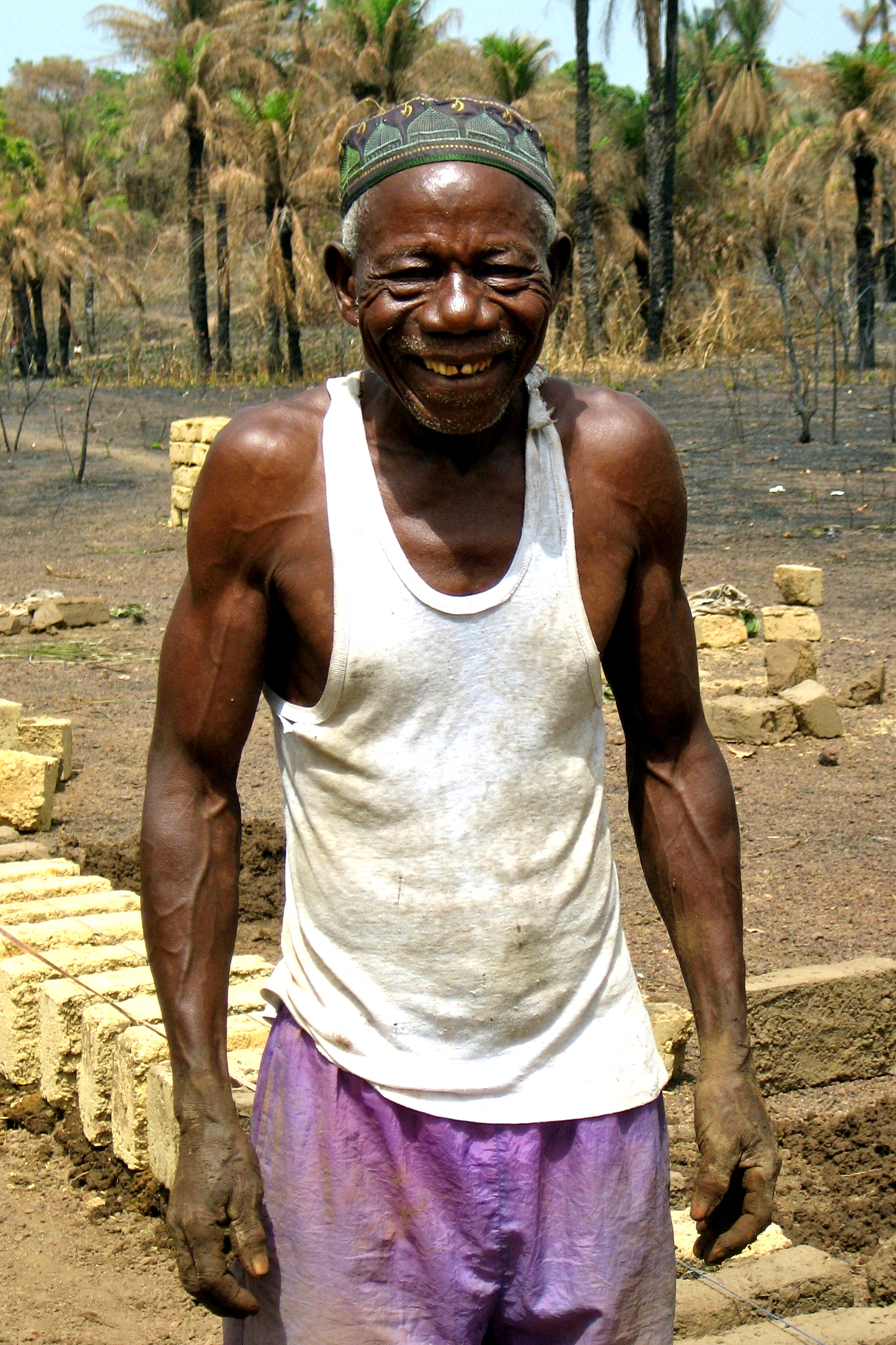
A Loko stonemason and carpenter, 2011.

The Loko in the north are native people of Sierra Leone, believed to have lived in Sierra Leone since the time of European encounter. Like the neighbouring Temne, the Loko are Muslim majority.

=== Susu and Yalunka ===
The Susu and their related Yalunka are traders who originally migrated from Guinea to Sierra Leone; both groups are primarily found in the far north in Kambia and Koinadugu District close to the border with Guinea. The Susu and Yalunka kingdom was established in the early 5th 7th century before Mali empire, which was extended from Mali, Senegal, Guinea Bissau, Guinea Conakry to the northern part of Sierra Leone. They are the original owners of the Futa Djallon region covered by a vars land area both the Susu and Yalunka people are descendants of the Mande people. They are virtually all Muslims. The Yalunka, also spelled Jallonke, Yalonga, Djallonké, Djallonka or Dialonké, are a Mande people who have lived in the Djallon, a mountainous region in Sierra Leone, Mali, Senegal, Guinea Bissau and Guinea Conakry West Africa over 520 years ago. The name Yalunka literally means "inhabitants of the Jallon (mountains)." Manga Sewa was born in Falaba, Solima chiefdom, in the Northern Province of British Sierra Leone to Yalunka parents. His father was a Yalunka paramount chief of Solima, a prosperous chieftaincy. Its capital, Falaba, was on the rich trading routes leading to the coast. Manga Sewa's father had a number of wives and dozens of children.

=== Kissi ===
The Kissi live further inland in South-Eastern Sierra Leone. They predominate in the large town of Koindu and its surrounding areas in Kailahun District. The vast majority of Kissi are Christians.

=== Vai ===
The much smaller Vai are primarily found in Kailahun and Pujehun Districts near the border with Liberia. The Vai are largely Muslim.

=== Kru ===
The Kru are also primarily found in Kailahun and Pujehun Districts near the border with Liberia. The Kru predominate in the Kroubay neighbourhood in the capital Freetown. The Kru are largely Christian.

=== Sherbro ===
On the coast in Bonthe District in the south are the Sherbro. Native to Sierra Leone, they have occupied Sherbro Island since it was founded. The Sherbro are primarily fisherman and farmers, and they are predominantly found in Bonthe District. The Sherbro are virtually all Christians, and their paramount chiefs had a history of intermarriage with British colonists and traders. The current president of Sierra Leone, Julius Maada Bio is an ethnic Sherbro.

=== Lebanese merchants ===
A small number of Sierra Leoneans are of partial or full Lebanese ancestry, descendants of traders who first came to the nation in the 19th century. They are locally known as Sierra Leonean-Lebanese. The Sierra Leonean-Lebanese community are primarily traders and they mostly live in middle-class households in the urban areas, primarily in Freetown, Bo, Kenema, Koidu Town and Makeni.
