= Koinadugu District =

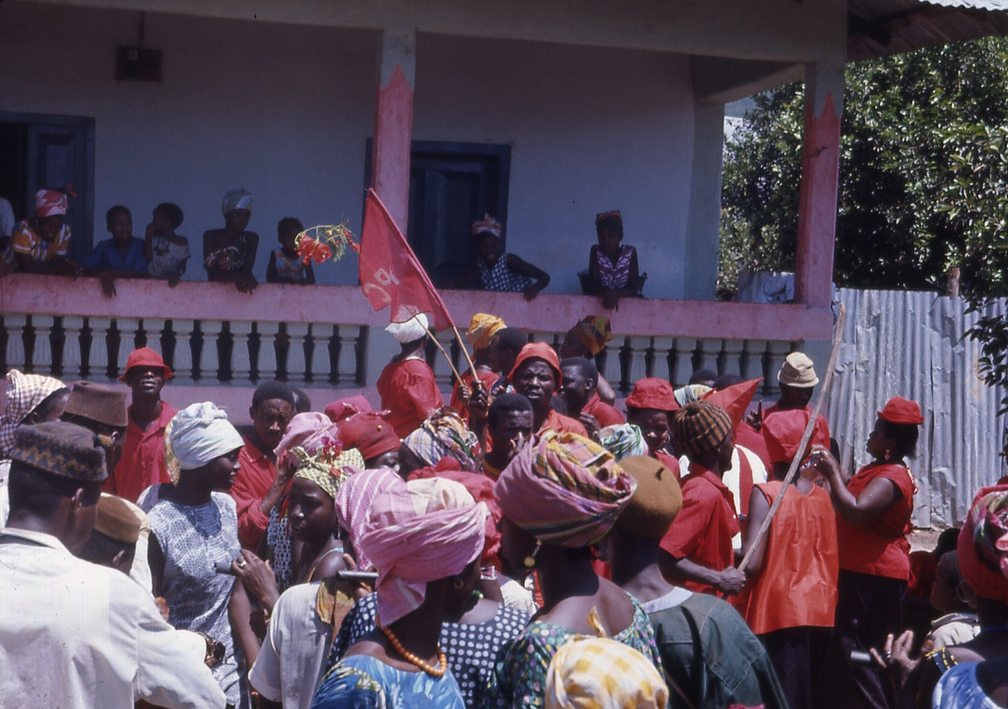
- The All People's Congress (APC) political rally in Kabala, Koinadugu District.

- Location of Koinadugu District in Sierra Leone
- Coordinates: 9°30′N 11°30′W
- Country: Sierra Leone
- Province: Northern Province
- Capital: Kabala
- Largest city: Kabala

Government
  - Type: District Council
  - District Council Chairman: Alex Sorie Konteh (APC)

Area
  - Total: 4,951 km^{2} (1,912 sq mi)
  - Rank: 1st

Population (2021 census)
  - Total: 206,133
  - Density: 41.63/km^{2} (107.8/sq mi)
- Time zone: UTC0 (Greenwich Mean Time)
- HDI (2017): 0.340 low · 14th

Koinadugu District is a district in the Northern Province of Sierra Leone. It is the largest districts in Sierra Leone in geographical area, and one of the least densely populated. Its capital and largest city is Kabala, which is also one of the main cities in Northern Sierra Leone. The district of Koinadugu has a population of 404,097, based on the 2015 Sierra Leone national census; and a total area of 12,121 km^{2} (4,680 sq mi). Koinadugu District is subdivided into eleven chiefdoms. Pre-2017 Koinadugu has been divided into two districts. The district is less than half the area it used to be before 2017, now has a land area covering 4,951 km^{2} (1,912 sq mi). The district of Koinadugu borders Bombali on the west, Tonkolili District to the south-west, Kono District to the south, Falaba District to the east, and the Republic of Guinea to north east. Diamond mining is a major economic activity in the district, as well as agricultural production of rice, mango, cacao, and coconut.

The population of Koinadugu district is almost entirely made up of five main ethnic groups: the Kuranko, Mandingo, Fula, Limba, and Yalunka. These five ethnic groups are politically and culturally influential in Koinadugu District. Koinadugu District is overwhelmingly Muslim majority at over 90% and Islam dominates the religious and cultural practices in the district. There is also a small but significant minority Christian population in the district, and is mainly among the Limba people in the district.

== Government ==
The District of Koinadugu is governed with a district council form of government, which is headed by a District Council Chairman, who is responsible for the general management of the district and for seeing that all local laws are enforced. The District Council Chairman is elected directly by the residents of Koinadugu District. The Council Hall of Koinadugu District located in the district capital of Kabala. The current chairman of Koinadugu district council is Sheku Samuel Kamara of the All People's Congress (APC).

== Demography ==
Koinadugu District is by far the largest district in Sierra Leone and with an estimated population of 265,765. The major ethnic groups in the district are the Fula (who predominate in the district's largest city of Kabala), Kuranko (who predominate in the chiefdoms), Mandingo and Limba and Yalunka (predominant in Musaia and Falaba areas bordering the republic of Guinea.

== Religion ==
Religion in Koinadugu District (2015)
Religion	Percent(%)
Islam	90.6%
Christianity	9.4%
Baháʼí	0.0%
Traditional African religions	0.0%
Other	0.4%
No religion	0.2%

== Members of Parliament ==
Koinadugu District currently has 7 Representatives in the Parliament of Sierra Leone, of which one member wasn't elected to a 5-year term.

== Economy ==
Mineral mining is a major economic activity in the district, as well as agricultural productivity such as rice, mango, beans, cattle rearing, to name but few.

== Administrative divisions ==
=== Chiefdoms ===
==== Pre-2017 ====
Prior to the 2017 local administrative reorganization, Koinadugu District was made up of eleven chiefdoms as the third level of administrative subdivision.

1. Dembelia Sikunia – Sikunia
2. Diang – Kondembaia
3. Folasaba – Musaia
4. Kasunko – Fadugu
5. Mongo – Bendugu
6. Neya – Krubola
7. Nieni – Yiffin
8. Sengbe – Yogomaia
9. Sulima – Falaba
10. Wara-Wara Bafodea – Bafodea
11. Wara-Wara Yagala – Gbawuria

==== Post-2017 ====
After the 2017 local administrative reorganization, Koinadugu District has made up of ten chiefdoms as the third level of administrative subdivision.

1. Diang – Kondembaia
2. Gbonkobon Kayaka (Note: Formerly part of Kasunko Chiefdom; split off.) – ?
3. Kalian (Note: Formerly part of Nieni Chiefdom.) – ?
4. Kamukeh (Note: Formerly part of Wara-Wara Bafodea Chiefdom.)' – ?
5. Kasunko KaKellian – ?
6. Nieni (Note: Lost area to Wollay Barawa Chiefdom; which moved to Falaba District.) – Yiffin
7. Sengbe (Note: Lost area to Kamadu Yirala Chiefdom; which moved to Falaba District.) – Yogomaia
8. Tamiso – Fadugu
9. Wara-Wara Bafodea – Bafodea
10. Wara-Wara Yagala – Gbawuria

=== Villages ===
- Kobaia
- Madogbo

== See also ==
- Ebola virus epidemic in Sierra Leone
