= Manga Sewa =

Yalunka tribal chief

Manga Sewa (died 1884) was a Yalunka chief of the Solimana who blew up a magazine and much of Falaba, the capital of Solimana, killing himself, his family and other leaders, rather than let it fall to Samori Toure's army.

== Early life and career ==
Manga Sewa was born in Falaba, Solimana chiefdom, in the Northern Province of British Sierra Leone to Yalunka parents. His father was a Yalunka paramount chief of Solimana, a prosperous chieftaincy. Its capital, Falaba, was on the rich trading routes leading to the coast. Manga Sewa's father had a number of wives and dozens of children.

== Touré 1884 attack ==
Manga Sewa became paramount chief of Solimana, a state in Northern Province. He was from one of the ruling families of the chieftaincy and would have been chief for life.

In the Beyla region of Guinea, Samori Toure (c.1830-1900), of the Touré clan, had expanded his influence; by 1878 he proclaimed himself faama (military leader) of his own Wassoulou Empire. In 1884 he took the title of Almany, commander of believers. In February of that year, he swept into north-east Sierra Leone, with his Mandinka army, bent on conquest.

N'fa Ali, Toure's general, destroyed many villages in the Yalunka Kingdom and ultimately laid siege to the capital, Falaba. The Yalunka held out for five months and, in the end, were reduced to eating rats and the boiled leather of their sandals and mats. Sewa finally sent his younger brother, Dugu, on a secret mission to obtain aid from the Kuranko people, but Dugu was captured and executed on a nearby hill in full view of his country-men.

Manga Sewa called his elders, his wives, and the community into the powder magazine. He plunged a flaming torch into the great barrels of gunpowder. An enormous explosion shook the town, and the Mandinka breached the walls and charged inside.

Toure opened contacts with the British colonial administration in Sierra Leone. He also built a working relationship with the Imamate of Futa Jallon.
