= Madogbo =

- Location in Sierra Leone
- Coordinates: 9°35′N 11°33′W
- Country: Sierra Leone
- Province: Northern Province
- District: Falaba District
- Chiefdom: Folosaba Dembelia

Government
  - Paramount Chief: Alhaji Fenda Modu Kamara
- Time zone: UTC-5 (GMT)

Madogbo is a mountainous Yalunka village in Folosaba Dembelia chiefdom in Falaba District in the Northern Province of Sierra Leone. The village lies about thirteen miles to Kabala, the main town in Koinadugu District. Madogbo is inhabited by the Yalunka people. The major industry in the village is farming.

The village of Madogbo is virtually all muslims and islam dominates the religious and cultural practices in the village. Traditional Islamic schools to learn the Quran are dominant in the village . Madogbo is home to one Sierra Leone government primary school.
