= Limba people (Sierra Leone) =

Ethnic group in Sierra Leone

Limba
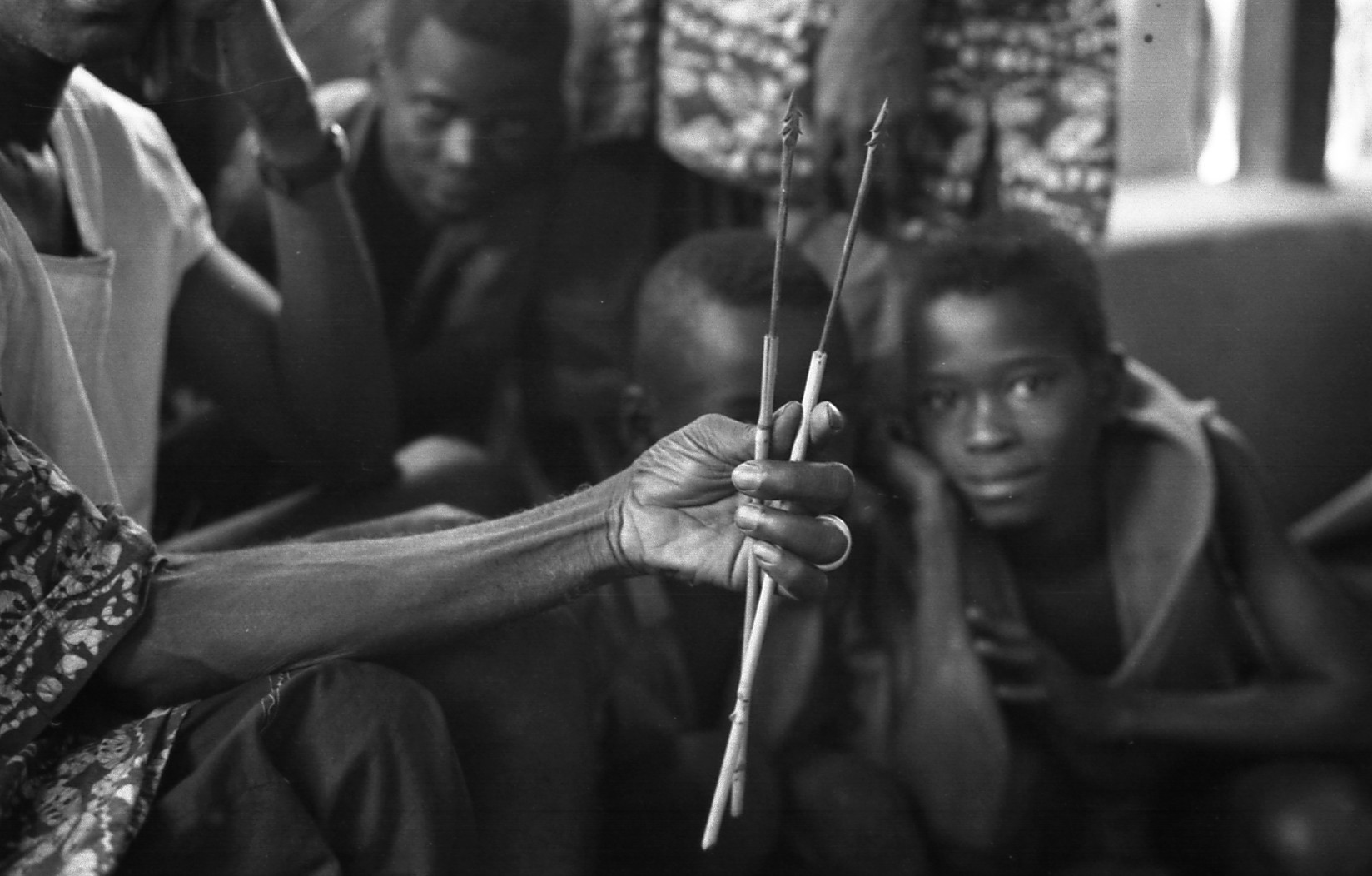
- 19th century Limba arrows held by Mamadou Mansaray, town chief of Bafodia, Sierra Leone (West Africa) 1967

Total population
- 792,190

Regions with significant populations
- Sierra Leone Guinea

Languages
- Limba • English • Krio

Religion
- Christianity, Islam and Indigenous beliefs

The Limba people are an ethnic group in Sierra Leone. They represent 12.4% of the total population, making them the third largest ethnic group in Sierra Leone. The Limba are based in the north of the country across seven provinces, but are predominantly found in the Northern Province of Sierra Leone.

The Limba are believed to be the earliest indigenous people of Sierra Leone. They speak a distinctive language that is unrelated to the other languages in Sierra Leone.

They are primarily found in the Northern Province, particularly in Bombali District, Koinadugu, Kambia District, Karene District and Tonkolili District but a small number are found in Guinea.

During Sierra Leone's colonial era, thousands of Limbas migrated to the capital city of Freetown and its Western Area. As a result, a significant number of Limbas can be found in Freetown and its surrounding Western Area.

During the 16th, 17th, and 18th century, many Limba people were shipped to North America as slaves.

The Limba are mainly rice farmers, traders, and hunters who live in the savannah-woodland region in the Northern Province of Sierra Leone. They predominate in 16 of Sierra Leone's 190 rural chiefdoms in Sierra Leone, and their community affairs are dominated by the local paramount chiefs.

Major Limba Towns include: Wara Wara Bafodia, Wara-Wara Yagala Chiefdom, Kabala, Kamakwie, Binkolo, Kamabai, Madina, Fadugu, Kamasasa, Mabonto and Kamasigi.

== History ==
Members of the Limba tribe believe that they have always lived in Sierra Leone in the Wara Wara mountains and were probably the first rulers of the territory. Some historians believe that the Limba were living in Sierra Leone prior to colonialism.

They were also scholars and philosophers who brought their knowledge of agriculture and trade with them.

During the colonial era, many Limba people were captured and sold at Bunce Island as slaves to the Americas through the Atlantic slave trade. To escape this, many Limba people traveled to the capital city of Freetown and the Western area, and as a result, most Limba are located in these places.

== Culture ==
The Limba consider themselves to be a mountain people and have at points in their history found themselves pushed into the mountains, particularly during the periods of Susu expansionism.

Historically, they also had to fight off incursions from the Fula and the Mandinka people.

The Limba take pride in their unique language, which differs from the other languages spoken in Sierra Leone. As a result, Limbas strive to be very articulate with their vocabulary as a way of sticking out among the rest.

They are mostly rice farmers, palm wine brewers, and stone builders.

They also have a past and current interest in politics, for example Siaka Stevens as the first president of Sierra Leone from 1971 to 1985, Ernest Bai Koroma as the former president of Sierra Leone from 2007, Christian Alusine Kamara-Taylor as a founding member of the All People's Congress and Paolo Conteh, the former defense minister and Eric Dura Sesay as the Bombali district chairman.

According to folklore, Limbas make excellent political leaders because they are descendants of the original rulers of Sierra Leone. The Limba's primary sport of interest is soccer, which is quite common amongst nations in West Africa.

The Limba have a spiritual home called The Kakoya Village, Wara-Wara Bafodia Chiefdom, and they believe all Limbas return to the mountain through the town beyond a "door" through the rock. An ancient wooden figure discovered in a cave at The Kakoya Village was probably made by the Limba people. Now in the British Museum, it may have represented an ancestor or deity. They also have a folklore about spirits called Krifi, but information about this is limited.

The Limba people also utilize practices of the Bondo secret society which aims at gradually but firmly establishing attitudes related to adulthood in girls, discussions on fertility, morality and proper sexual comportment. The society also maintains an interest in the well-being of its members throughout their lives.

== Religion and spiritual beliefs ==
=== Christianity ===
The Limba in the southern province are mostly influenced by Christianity. Portuguese Christian missionary efforts began before the Protestant Reformation but had no lasting effects on the Temne. The Protestant presence accompanied the founding of Freetown in the late eighteenth century; Church Missionary Society representatives were active up the Rokel River and elsewhere in Temne country throughout the nineteenth century. In the 1890s, the Soudna Mission was the first American mission in the Temne area; American Wesleyans and the Evangelical United Brethren subsequently joined the field.

=== Islam ===
Most Limba are Muslim. The Limba in the Northern Province are somewhat influenced by Islam. Muslim contacts probably go back several centuries, and fifteenth-century Portuguese were cognizant of Muslim peoples. Early traders, holy men, and warriors brought Islam into the area from the north by the Susu and northeast by the Fula and Mandinka. Through the nineteenth century, as the volume of trade grew, Muslim influences increased; in the late twentieth century, a significant proportion of the Limba were Muslim converts. Muslim Limba still practice aspects of their traditional religion as well.

=== Traditional beliefs ===
A minority of Limbo practice their traditional religion and are mostly located in more remote villages. Beliefs include worship of Kanumasala along with others. Creation of shrines, charms and rituals play a significant role in traditional Limba religion.

== Notable Limbas ==
- Siaka Stevens, president of Sierra Leone from 1971 to 1985
- Joseph Saidu Momoh, president of Sierra Leone from 1985 to 1992
- Christian Alusine Kamara-Taylor, Sierra Leonean politician
- Johnny Paul Koroma, Head of State of Sierra Leone from May 1997 to February 1998
- Ernest Bai Koroma, former president of Sierra Leone from 2007 to 2018
- Brima Acha Kamara, the former Inspector General of the Sierra Leone Police (SLP)
- Alfred Paolo Conteh, Current Sierra Leone's Minister of Defence
- Dauda Sulaiman Kamara, current Sierra Leone's Minister of Internal Affairs Minister and Rural Development
- Moses Musa Sesay, Former mayor of Makeni
- Kandeh Baba Conteh, Sierra Leonean politician and leader of the Peace and Liberation Party (PLP)
- Lamin Conteh, footballer
- Abdul Thompson Conteh, footballer
- Kewullay Conteh, footballer
- Sampha, UK musician
- Adama Delphine Fawundu
- Dembakwi Yomba
- James Bambay Kamara, former Inspector General of Sierra Leone Police from 1987 to 1992
- Jimmy Bangura, musician and filmmaker
