= Solimana (state) =

Minor West African state of the nineteenth century

Solimana was a small West African state of the nineteenth century with a capital at the fortress town of Falaba. Situated on rich trading routes in what is now Sierra Leone, Solimana was visited in 1822 by Alexander Gordon Laing and in 1869 by William Winwood Reade, making it nominally British.

It was formed by the Yalunka of the Samura clan, it was an amalgamation of various Yalunka clans in order to resist Futa Jallon expansion. The state managed to survice the threat and began to expand its political influence within the region.

In 1884, Mandinka conqueror Samori joined the king of Kaliere in attacking Solimana, then under the rule of Manga Sewa. After Samori's general N'fa Ali destroyed a number of surrounding villages, the Mandinka forces began a five-month siege of Falaba itself. With the city's residents starved nearly to death, Manga Sewa gathered his family in Falaba's gunpowder magazine and lit a torch, simultaneously killing himself and breaching Falaba's walls.

The territory of Solimana was then briefly assimilated into Samori's Wassoulou Empire. Following Samori's own fall several years later, it was claimed by the British and incorporated into the Crown Colony of Sierra Leone.
