= Liberté (anthem) =

National anthem of Guinea

English: Liberty
- National anthem of Guinea
- Lyrics: Original: Korofo Moussa, 1904; Modern: Fodéba Keïta and Jean Cellier, 1958
- Music: Original: Korofo Moussa, 1904; Modern: Fodéba Keïta, 1958
- Adopted: 2 October 1958

Audio sample
- U.S. Navy Band instrumental version: file; help

"Liberté" (Pulaar: 𞤐𞤁𞤋𞤃𞤓; "Liberty") is the national anthem of Guinea. Adopted upon independence in 1958, it was arranged by Fodéba Keïta and is based on the melody of a Maninka praise song by Korofo Moussa for 19th-century Fouta Djallon king Alpha Yayo Diallo.

== History ==
=== Korofo Moussa's song ===
The music of the anthem is derived from a praise song for the late-1800s king of Labé, in Fouta Djallon, Alpha Yaya Diallo (or Alfa Yaya). Alpha Yaya is, along with Wassoulou Empire founder Samory Touré, considered central by Guineans to the foundation of the modern Guinean nation, in part because of his fierce attempts to resist colonisation.

In 1904, Alpha Yaya was one of many traditional chiefs and kings summoned to a doctrinal conference with French colonists, who were still in the process of consolidating his territory. The chiefs each brought along a retinue for the journey; in Alpha Yaya's retinue was griot Korofo Moussa, from Kissidougou in the south of the country. Alpha Yaya arrived to the conference on its sixth day, and Korofo Moussa is said to have spontaneously improvised, along with his troupe of dancers and kora players, a praise song for Alpha Yaya after he arrived. The song began with the line "Alpha Yaya, Mansa bè Manka" ("Alpha Yaya, mansas (kings) are not the same"). According to Fodéba Isto Keira, former Minister of Youth, Sports and Culture, the performance took place in the building of the modern Directorate of the Judicial Police in the Kaloum sub-prefecture of Conakry.

Korofo Moussa's air quickly became popular; it was sung and played by all the griots for the rest of the conference, and within a few days it was known throughout Conakry. Alpha Yaya's personal griot immediately trained to play the song. Upon the return of the kings and their retinues to their regions, it spread throughout the country.

=== Modern anthem ===
Upon approaching independence in 1958, the lyrics of Korofo Moussa's song were reworked and written in French by artist, choreographer and politician Fodéba Keïta and Jean Cellier for the national anthem of Guinea. Korofo Moussa's melody was retained for the anthem. According to Keira, Keïta used the solfège method when working with the music. Keira stated that the national anthem had to be inspired by something from Fouta Djallon for the sake of avoiding frustrations and preserving national unity.

The anthem was adopted upon independence on 2 October 1958 and included in article 1 of the constitution of 10 November 1958. A translation of the anthem into Maninka was made by Djeli Mamoudou Kandé (c. 1935 – 2008) from the Instrumental Ensemble. According to Kandé, while Minister of the Interior, Fodéba Keïta had in fact asked him to write the lyrics for the anthem some months after independence.

The anthem is played on national television at the close of every broadcasting day.

== Lyrics ==
French original

Peuple d'Afrique,
Le Passé historique !
Que chante l'hymne de la Guinée fière et jeune
Illustre épopée de nos frères
Morts au champ d'honneur en libérant l'Afrique !
Le peuple de Guinée prêchant l'unité.

Appelle l'Afrique.
Liberté! C'est la voix d'un peuple
Qui appelle tous ses frères de la grande Afrique.

Liberté! C'est la voix d'un peuple
Qui appelle tous ses frères à se retrouver.
Bâtissons l'unité africaine dans l'indépendance retrouvée.

English translation

People of Africa,
The historical past!
Let the anthem of a proud and young Guinea
The illustrious epic of our brothers
Who died on the field of honour, liberating Africa!
The people of Guinea preaching unity.

Call Africa.
Freedom! It's the voice of a people
Who call all of their brothers from across Africa!

Freedom! It's the voice of a people
Who call all their brothers to come together.
Let us build African unity in regained independence.
