= Governor Denham =

Governor Denham may refer to:

- Dixon Denham (1786–1828), Governor of Sierra Leone in 1828
- Edward Brandis Denham (1876–1938), Governor of the Gambia from 1928 to 1930, Governor of British Guiana from 1930 to 1935, and Governor of Jamaica from 1935 to 1938
