= Alfred Paolo Conteh =

Minister of Defense
- Incumbent
- Assumed office 26 October 2007
- President: Ernest Bai Koroma
- Preceded by: Ahmad Tejan Kabbah

Personal details
- Born: Freetown, Sierra Leone
- Party: All People's Congress (APC)
- Relations: Joseph Saidu Momoh (uncle)
- Education: University of London, University of East London
- Profession: Attorney, soldier

Military service
- Allegiance: Sierra Leone
- Branch/service: Sierra Leone Army
- Years of service: 1976–1992
- Rank: Major

Alfred Paolo Conteh is a retired major in the Sierra Leone Armed Forces who has been Defense Minister of Sierra Leone since October 2007. He was appointed by President Ernest Bai Koroma and was later confirmed by parliament. Conteh is the nephew of former President Joseph Saidu Momoh.

Conteh is a keen sprinter and sportsman. He has held Sierra Leone's 400m record since 1982. He plays football, volleyball, handball, squash and tennis.

Born and raised in Freetown to parents from the Limba ethnic group, Conteh enlisted in the Sierra Leone Army as a cadet officer in 1976. In 1981, Conteh became one of the commanding officers of the Sierra Leone Military Police unit, a branch of the Sierra Leone Army.

Conteh went to law school in the United Kingdom. He obtained a Bachelor of Laws degree (LLB) from the University of London in 1990. He was called to the Bar of England and Wales in 1992. He also obtained a Master of Laws (LLM) from the Holborn School of Law in the United Kingdom.

== Early life ==
Alfred Paolo Conteh was born and raised in the neighborhood of Wilberforce in Freetown, Sierra Leone to parents from the Limba ethnic group.

== Military service ==
Upon graduation from secondary school, Conteh enrolled in the Sierra Leone Army as a cadet officer in 1976. Upon completion of a two-year cadet training in 1978, Conteh was promoted to second lieutenant in the Sierra Leone Army and was posted as Platoon Commander at the Benguema barracks in Benguema, Sierra Leone.

In 1981, Conteh became one of the commanding officers of the Sierra Leone Military Police unit, a branch of the Sierra Leone Army. In 1983, Conteh was promoted to captain.

== Law school ==
He went to law school in 1986 in the United Kingdom. He obtained the Bachelor of Laws Degree (LLB) from the University of London LLB (law) in 1990. He was called to the Bar of England and Wales in 1992. He also obtained a Master of Laws (LLM) from the Holborn School of Law in the United Kingdom.
