= William Winwood Reade =

British historian, explorer, and philosopher

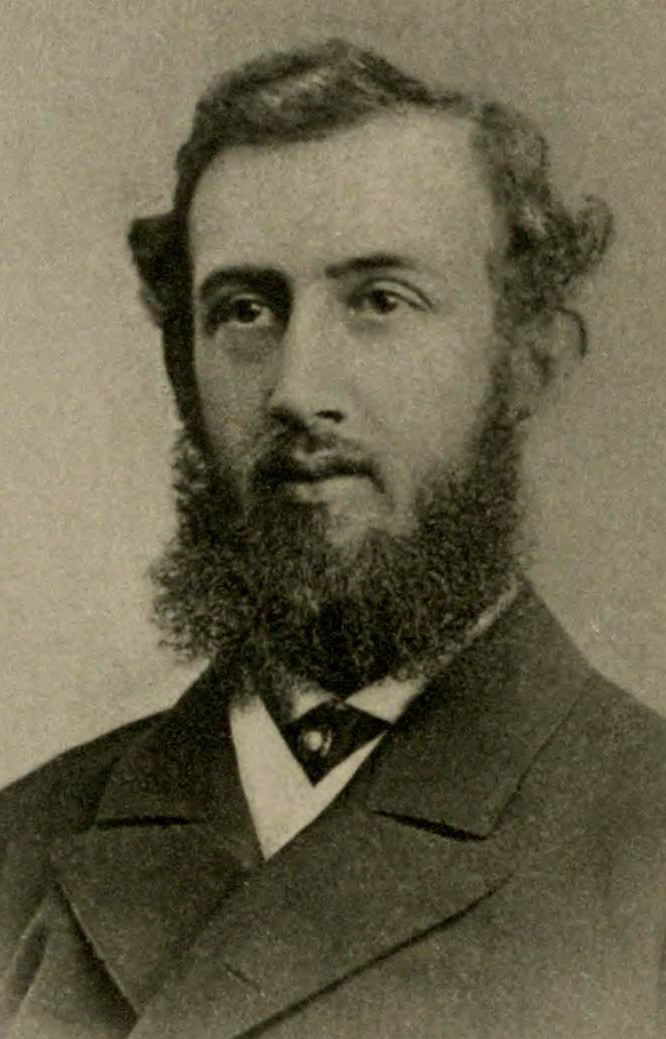
Photo of William Winwood Reade published during 1910.

William Winwood Reade (26 December 1838 – 24 April 1875) was a British historian, explorer, novelist and philosopher. His two best-known books, the universal history The Martyrdom of Man (1872) and the novel The Outcast (1875), were included in the Thinker's Library. Reade published one novel under the pseudonym Francesco Abati.

== Biography ==
=== Early life ===
Born in Perthshire, Scotland in 1838, William Winwood Reade was a "scion of a wealthy, landed family". He took after his uncle, Charles Reade, who was a novelist. Having failed at Oxford University and, despite having composed two novels, "failed in any conventional sense as a novelist", Reade decided to begin geographical exploration.

=== Travels to Africa ===
Thus, at age 25, using his private funds and with sponsorship from the Royal Geographical Society, he departed for Africa, arriving in Cape Town by paddle steamer during 1862. After several months of observing gorillas and travelling through Angola, Gambia, and Senegal, Reade returned home and published his first travel account, Savage Africa. Although criticised for its juvenile style, the book is notable for its anthropological inquiries, as well as for its exculpatory passages concerning the slave trade and its prophecy of an Africa divided between Britain and France in which black Africans have become extinct.

In 1863 Reade became a member of the newly created Anthropological Society of London (ASL), led by James Hunt, a conservative Christian and defender of slavery. Reade was attracted to Hunt's goal to further a "science of man", but he soon found himself debating Hunt during meetings on a number of important issues. Most notably, Reade challenged Hunt’s thesis that black Africans ought to be classified as a distinct species ("polygenism"), and he argued that the degenerate state of the African people was due to disease and climate. Reade also questioned the feasibility of converting Africans to orthodox Christianity, citing the African practice of polygamy as a major barrier. The rift between Reade and Hunt ultimately led to him being forced to resign from the Council of the ASL in 1865. Subsequently Reade attended ASL meetings sporadically before leaving the society for good a few years later.

In 1867 Reade traveled to the United States to study anthropology with Louis Agassiz and Jeffries Wyman. The next year Reade secured the patronage of London-based Gold Coast trader Andrew Swanzy to journey to West Africa. After failing to get permission to enter the Ashanti Empire, Reade set out north from Freetown to explore the areas past the Solimana capital of Falaba. He was detained in Falaba by the local King Seedwa, who imprisoned him for three months under conditions of physical and mental hardship. Legend has it that King Seedwa set four gruelling tasks for Reade each day of his captivity, all of which Reade completed with aplomb. Undaunted, Reade went back along his previous route and this time got permission to enter the Ashanti Empire. He traveled along the Niger, but as the source was inaccessible due to native wars, he went to the "gold mines of the Bouri", an area never explored by a European.

Though Reade travelled over some unexplored territory, his findings excited little interest among geographers, due mostly to his failure to make accurate measurements of his journey as his sextant and other instruments had been left behind at Port Loko. However, his experiences of West Africa were not entirely lost to science, thanks to his correspondence with Charles Darwin. Darwin subsequently used information given by Reade for his publication The Descent of Man (1871).

Soon after Reade's return, he published his The African Sketch-Book (1873), an account of his travels that also recommended greater British involvement in West Africa. Reade returned to Africa in 1873 to serve as a correspondent for the Ashanti War, but died not long after. He was buried in Ipsden churchyard, Oxfordshire, close to the family home.

== The Martyrdom Of Man (1872) ==
The Martyrdom of Man (1872)—- whose summary line reads "From Nebula to Nation"—- is a secular, "universal" history of the Western world. Structurally, it is divided into four "chapters" of approximately 150 pages each: the first chapter, "War", discusses the imprisonment of men's bodies, the second, "Religion", that of their minds, the third, "Liberty", is the closest to a conventional European political and intellectual history, and the fourth, "Intellect", discusses the cosmogony characteristic of a "universal history". Charles Darwin agreed to review the book for gross errors shortly before publication.

=== Secularism ===
According to one historian, the book became a kind of "substitute bible for secularists" in which Reade attempts to trace the development of Western civilisation in terms analogous to those used in the natural sciences. He uses it to advance the philosophy of political liberalism and social Darwinism. The final section of the book provoked enormous controversy due to Reade's "outspoken attack on Christian dogma" and the book was condemned by several magazines. In 1872 William Gladstone, the British Prime Minister, denounced The Martyrdom of Man as one of several "irreligious works" (the others included work by Auguste Comte, Herbert Spencer, and David Friedrich Strauss).

Reade was not an atheist, as some of his critics maintained; he had a "presumptive belief in a Creator, but one ineffable and unapproachable, far beyond the grasp of the human intellect or the reach of petty human prayers". He was a social Darwinist who believed in the survival of the fittest and wanted to create a new civilisation, contending that "while war, slavery, and religion had once been necessary, they would not always be so; in the future only science could guarantee human progress". Nevertheless, the book "drew attention to the immense tale of suffering and waste involved in the theory of evolution".

=== Reception and influence ===
The book's initial reception was negative. The Athenaeum said the book was "indecent", "profane", and "worthless" while The Saturday Review described it as "likely blasphemous".

The book slowly became popular despite negative reviews in the press, and by 1910 eighteen editions had been published. V. S. Pritchett lauded The Martyrdom of Man as "the one, the outstanding, dramatic, imaginative historical picture of life, to be inspired by Victorian science". Since The Martyrdom of Man had, by Victorian standards, a relatively sympathetic account of African history, it was approvingly cited by W. E. B. Du Bois in his books The Negro (1915) and The World and Africa (1947).

Cecil Rhodes, an English-born South African politician and businessman, said that the book "made me what I am". In the Introduction to his The Outline of History (1920), H. G. Wells noted the book as an influence and described it as "dated" but also as an "extraordinarily inspiring presentation of human history as one consistent process." Other admirers of The Martyrdom of Man included Winston Churchill, Harry Johnston, George Orwell, Susan Isaacs, A. A. Milne and his son Christopher Robin, and Michael Foot.

== The Outcast (1875) ==
Reade's other secularist work, The Outcast (1875), is a short novel about a young man who must deal with being rejected by his religious father and the death of his wife.

== References in literature ==
Reade is quoted in one of Arthur Conan Doyle's Sherlock Holmes adventures, The Sign of the Four. In the second chapter, Holmes recommends The Martyrdom of Man to Dr. Watson as 'one of the most remarkable [books] ever penned.' He remarks subsequently in chapter ten:

"Winwood Reade is good upon the subject," said Holmes. "He remarks that, while the individual man is an insoluble puzzle, in the aggregate he becomes a mathematical certainty. You can, for example, never foretell what any one man will do, but you can say with precision what an average number will be up to. Individuals vary, but percentages remain constant. So says the statistician".

Reade is also referenced in C. S. Lewis's third novel of his Space trilogy, That Hideous Strength, and is linked by the narrator rather disparagingly to "ideas which were out of date and had been crude even in their prime" of other writers and thinkers such as Ernst Haeckel and Joseph McCabe. In Alaisdair Gray's Poor Things, Bella Baxter is told that Martyrdom of Man proves the view that "cruelty to the helpless will never end as the healthy live by trampling these down".

== Works ==
- (1859). Charlotte and Myra: A Puzzle in Six Bits.
- (1860). Liberty Hall, Oxon. (A Novel)
- (1861). The Veil of Isis or Mysteries of the Druids.
  - The Druids.
  - Druidism in Rustic Folklore.
  - Druidism in the Emblems of Freemasonry.
  - Druidism in the Ceremonies of the Church Of Rome.
  - Rites And Ceremonies Of The Druids.
  - Vestiges Of Druidism.
  - The Destruction Of The Druids.
  - Priestesses Of The Druids – Pamphlet.
- (1864). Savage Africa.
- (1865). See-Saw: A Novel (Written under the pseudonym Francesco Abati).
- (1872). The Martyrdom of Man.
- (1873). African Sketch-Book.
- (1874). The Story of the Ashantee Campaign.
- (1875). The Outcast.
- (1972). Religion in History.
