= Kobaia, Sierra Leone =

Sierra Leone community

Coordinates: 9°34′N 11°23′W

Kobaia is a community in Northern Province of Sierra Leone. It is located in the Koinadugu District.
