= Brima Acha Kamara =

Sierra Leonean police general and diplomat

Brima Archa Kamara is a Sierra Leonean police general and diplomat, who was the former Inspector General of Sierra Leone Police (SLP), the professional head of the Sierra Leone Police forces. Since July 2014 he has been the Ambassador of Sierra Leone to Liberia and Ivory Coast.

He was appointed to the position by former president Ahmad Tejan Kabbah. Kamara is a member of the Limba ethnic group. Kamara also has relation to the town Kamabai situated in the Northern Province of Sierra Leone, 15 miles away from the capital of Bombali, Makeni as well as Mabokeni and Binkolo.
