= Kabala, Sierra Leone =

Kabala
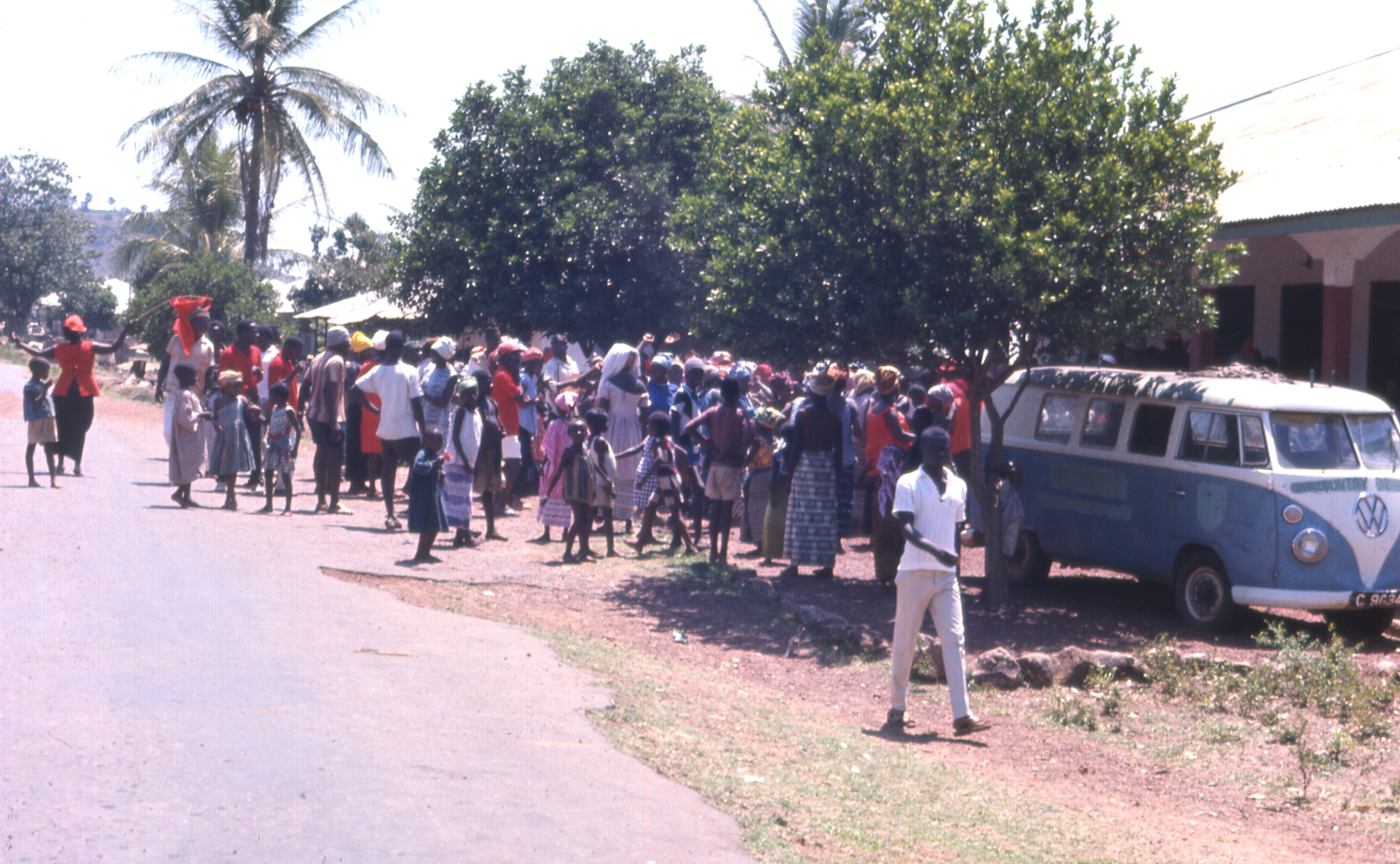
- The All People's Congress (APC) political rally in Kabala

- Location in Sierra Leone
- Coordinates: 9°35′N 11°33′W
- Country: Sierra Leone
- Province: Northern Province
- District: Koinadugu District

Population (2010)
  - Total: 18,770 (estimate)
- Time zone: UTC-5 (GMT)

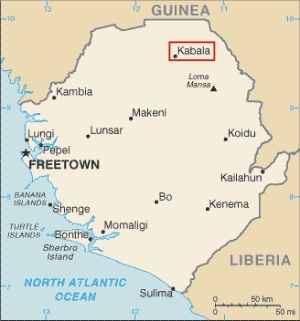
Kabala

Kabala (Pular : 𞤑𞤢𞤦𞤢𞤤𞤢) is the capital and largest town of Koinadugu District in the Northern Province of Sierra Leone. Kabala is one of the main towns in Northern Sierra Leone and is set in a rural landscape, surrounded by mountains.

Kabala lies approximately 85 miles (137 km) north-east of Makeni, the largest city in the north, and approximately 200 miles (320 km) east of the capital Freetown. Kabala had a population of 14,108 in the 2004 census, and a current estimate of 18,770 The population of Kabala is predominantly Muslim, though there is a substantial Christian minority.

Kabala is an agricultural centre and lies on the far north of Sierra Leone, with close proximity to Kono District and the international border with Guinea . Kabala is one of the largest towns in Sierra Leone in total land area; but is less densely populated.

Kabala is one of the most ethnically diverse cities in Sierra Leone, with no single ethnic group forming a majority. Like the rest of Koinadugu District, the inhabitants of Kabala are largely from the Kuranko, Mandingo, Yalunka, Limba and Fula ethnic groups. As with most parts of Sierra Leone, the Krio language of the Sierra Leone Creole people is the most widely spoken language in Kabala.

Sierra Leone's former president Ernest Bai Koroma celebrated the 2012 New Year in Kabala. President Koroma held a townhall meeting at the Yogomaia Field in Kabala and attended new year church services at the Holy Martyrs Catholic Church in the town.

== History ==
After the Anglo-Franco settlement of 1895, the British colonial administration post was moved from Falaba to Kabala, then an insignificant village not shown on the detailed maps of the British.

Kabala is a place name in the Limba and Fula languages literally meaning 'at Bala' or 'Bala's place.' Both languages utilizes the prefix 'ka-' as a place identifier. Postmarks on King George VI postage stamps use the spelling Kaballa.

The town incorporates two chiefdom centers: Gbawuria the center for the Limba chiefdom of Wara Wara Yagala and Yogomaia the center for the Koranko chiefdom of Sengbe. With respect to native governance, Kabala is split between the Limba and Koranko Paramount Chiefs. Kabala grew rapidly under British rule. Traders and merchants were attracted to this colonial administrative town from the 1930s, and, after 1947, shop premises were opened by Lebanese traders.

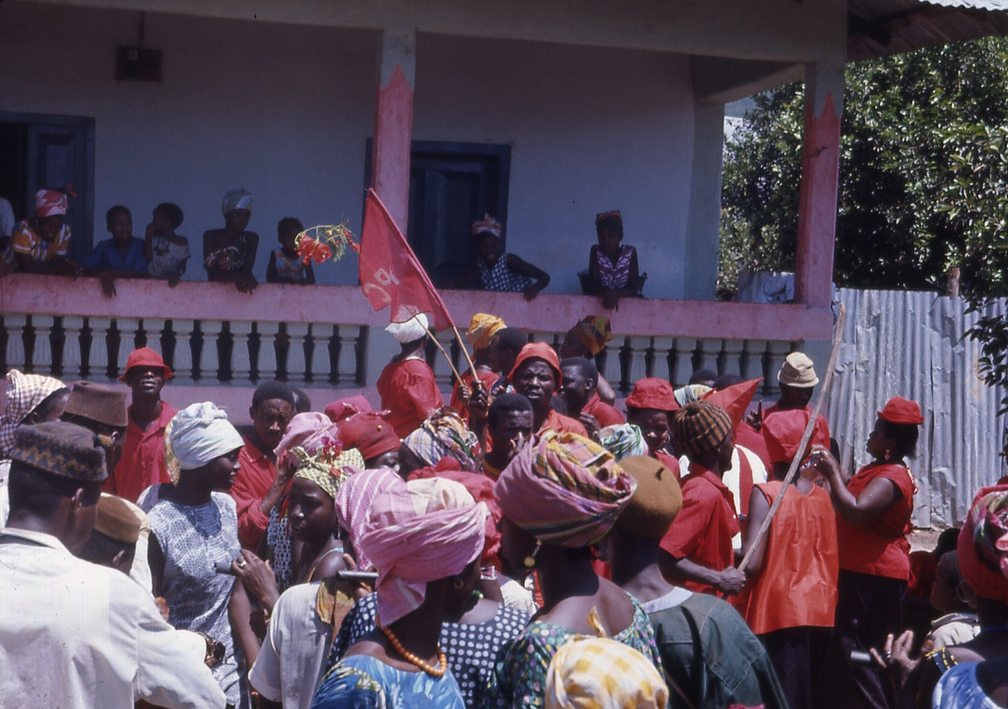
All People's Congress political rally, 1968

In 2000 the United Nations reported that, after the Civil War, "Kabala, in the north, life appears to be returning to normal following fighting". In 2002 newspapers reported a visit to the town by "Bangladesh's visiting foreign minister", suggesting that the town had sufficiently recovered for it to be shown to important overseas visitors.

== Climate ==
Climate data for Kabala, Sierra Leone (1961-1990 normals, WMO Station number: 61886)
Month	Jan	Feb	Mar	Apr	May	Jun	Jul	Aug	Sep	Oct	Nov	Dec	Year
Mean daily maximum °C (°F)	32.7 (90.9)	34.8 (94.6)	35.0 (95.0)	33.4 (92.1)	31.5 (88.7)	29.6 (85.3)	28.0 (82.4)	27.7 (81.9)	28.8 (83.8)	30.2 (86.4)	31.1 (88.0)	31.4 (88.5)	31.2 (88.1)
Daily mean °C (°F)	24.8 (76.6)	27.0 (80.6)	27.8 (82.0)	27.3 (81.1)	26.2 (79.2)	24.8 (76.6)	23.8 (74.8)	23.9 (75.0)	23.9 (75.0)	24.4 (75.9)	24.7 (76.5)	23.6 (74.5)	25.2 (77.3)
Mean daily minimum °C (°F)	16.7 (62.1)	19.2 (66.6)	21.0 (69.8)	21.2 (70.2)	21.5 (70.7)	20.9 (69.6)	20.7 (69.3)	20.7 (69.3)	20.5 (68.9)	20.3 (68.5)	19.5 (67.1)	16.4 (61.5)	19.9 (67.8)
Average precipitation mm (inches)	3.9 (0.15)	8.9 (0.35)	30.4 (1.20)	97.2 (3.83)	192.9 (7.59)	284.8 (11.21)	319.4 (12.57)	386.8 (15.23)	383.3 (15.09)	291.4 (11.47)	73.7 (2.90)	4.7 (0.19)	2,077.4 (81.78)
Average rainy days	0	1	2	7	14	19	24	27	24	21	6	1	146
Average relative humidity (%) (at 15:00 local time)	28	28	34	46	60	68	73	76	71	66	55	36	53
Average dew point °C (°F)	11.8 (53.2)	14.6 (58.3)	17.0 (62.6)	19.9 (67.8)	21.6 (70.9)	21.6 (70.9)	21.2 (70.2)	21.3 (70.3)	21.4 (70.5)	21.5 (70.7)	20.4 (68.7)	14.6 (58.3)	18.9 (66.0)
Mean monthly sunshine hours	241.8	226.8	244.9	219.0	207.7	168.0	136.4	114.7	147.0	192.2	210.0	226.3	2,334.8
Percentage possible sunshine	68	69	66	60	54	45	35	30	41	53	61	64	53
Source: NOAA

== Demography ==
The predominant religion in Kabala is Islam, followed by Christianity. Kabala is one of the most ethnically diverse towns in Sierra Leone. The population is largely from the Fula, Kuranko, Mandingo, Temne, Yalunka and Limba ethnic groups.

== Media ==
Bintumani 93.7 is the local radio station that serves Kabala and the rest of Koinadugu District. Sierra Leone's national radio and television station, SLBS, is on the air in the city, as well as the BBC World Service, CNN International, and several other private stations are on the air for those who have satellite.

== Education ==
There are government-recognised secondary schools, all of which have religious affiliations. There is a new Islamic school, the Kabala Islamic Secondary School, which is as yet unrecognised.

Kabala Secondary School is the biggest and oldest secondary school. It was founded by Catholic missionaries.

== Sport ==
Like the rest of Sierra Leone, football is by far the most popular sport in Kabala. The city's major football team is the Bintumani Scorpions. The club currently plays in the Sierra Leone Nationwide First Division, the second highest football league in Sierra Leone, and the second biggest football club within the township is the TAG family football club.

== Industries and infrastructure ==
The town is known for its cloth and tailoring, and especially for the making of the "ronko" gown, a traditional Limba and Koranko war shirt which is believed to have supernatural powers.

There is no electricity other than individual generators.

There are medical facilities, the government hospital and two clinics.

There are a number of traditional circular hut settlements on the outskirts, but mostly the buildings are single-story tin and brick.

The surrounding landscape is agriculturally rich, and there is seasonal rice-planting. Vegetables, such as tomatoes, green beans and cabbage, and fruits, such as mangoes and bananas, are also grown in Kabala.

There is an 80-mile bus service from Makeni, but the surfaced highway peters out some 25 miles (40 km) from Kabala and forms a winding dirt track.

There is a central business district and roofed market, with large well-stocked Lebanese-run stores. The market serves as an unofficial social centre as well as a trading centre. Kabala Community Bank houses a branch of the Western Union.

== Leisure ==
There is a cinema, a night club and multiple venues that screen football matches. There are also a few restaurants that serve various rice-based dishes. There is a traditional New Year's Day picnic on Gbawuria Hill to the west of the town, which attracts people from around the country.
