= Sunkari Kabba-Kamara =

Sierra Leone politician

Sunkarie Kabba-Kamara

Mayor of Makeni
- In office December 22, 2012 – June 24, 2023

Personal details
- Born: May 29, 1969 (age 57) Makeni, Sierra Leone
- Party: All People's Congress (APC)

Sunkari Kabba-Kamara (born May 29, 1969) is a Sierra Leonean politician. She served as mayor of the city of Makeni until June 2023. Abubakarr Kamara, widely recognized as Lamtales, assumed office as the current mayor of the Makeni City Council following the tenure of his predecessor (Sunkari Kabba Kamara). His victory in the mayoral election on June 24, 2024, with a percentage of 93.38% saw him triumph over his contender, Kamara Amadu, securing his position as the political head of Makeni City Council.

Sunkari Kabba Kamara is a member of the opposition All People's Congress (APC) political party.

She defeated the incumbent mayor of Makeni Moses Musa Sesay in a landslide in the APC primary election held on September 2, 2012, in Makeni.

She won the 2012 mayoral election with 86.95%, over her main opponent Abu A Koroma of the Sierra Leone People's Party, and was sworn in as mayor on December 22, 2012. Her inauguration ceremony was attended by many senior members of the APC party, including Sierra Leone's president Ernest Bai Koroma.

== Personal life ==
Kabba-Kamara is a native of Bombali District in Northern Sierra Leone, and a member of the Mandingo ethnic group.
