= Hanmer Warrington =

British diplomat

Hanmer George Warrington (c. 1776 – 1847) was born in Acton, Nantwich, Cheshire, England, served in the British Army, attaining the rank of lieutenant colonel and subsequently became British Consul General at Tripoli on the Barbary Coast (in present-day Libya), a position he held for an unusually long term of 32 years. He was rumored to be married to an illegitimate child of king George IV, later but historians consider it to be "improbable". As consul he played an important role in assisting British exploration of the Niger river.

== Biography ==
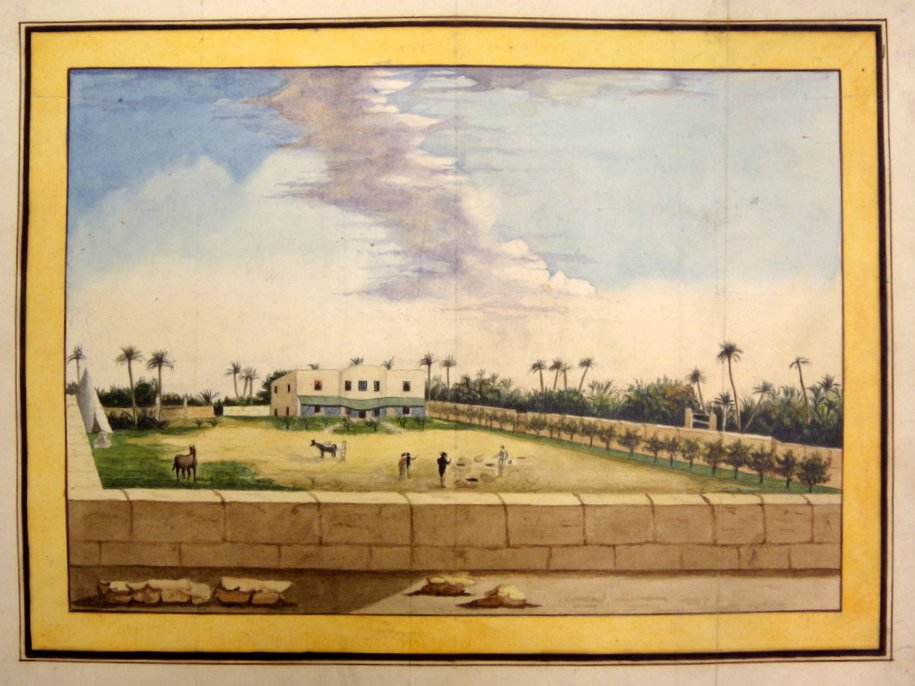
Hanmer Warrington's private villa near Tripoli known as the "English Garden" hosted lavish parties.

Warrington was the son of a country parson and grew up in Denbighshire. At age 16 he joined the 1st Dragoon Guards and saw service in Spain. He retired a Colonel in 1812 and married and had ten children. He became Consul-General in Tripoli in 1814.

A possible mystery surrounds Warrington's wife, Jane-Eliza Pryce, who was rumoured to be the illegitimate child of the Prince Regent, later George IV. This was never proven, and later historians see it as "improbable". Some have used the theory to explain why Warrington held his position in Tripoli for so long, and why Whitehall was so tolerant of his abuses there. In fact Warrington did receive patronage from the Duke of York, and it was later said he lost 40,000 pounds to George IV in a night of gambling, so he had some connections to the Royal Family, but to what extent is unknown. It does not require a royal scandal to explain events.

He was continually rebuked by his masters at Whitehall due to complaints from foreign embassies about bad behavior. He was described as being "fanatically patriotic, consumed with vanity, and deficient in both intelligence and imagination, and a sore trial to other consuls." He was a heavy drinker, had a violent temper and surrounded himself with a clique of local Arabs of ill-repute. Nevertheless, he had a charisma and often found a way to make up and become chummy with those he quarreled with. He wore the unusual costume of a "red coat with blue facings and collar, richly embroidered in gold, French epaulets, and a cocked hat profusely decorated with ostrich feathers."

Warrington was often remembered for the villa he built about two miles outside the walls of Tripoli. It was informally known as the Garden or English Garden, located in the present suburb of Mensia. It was described as a "splendid horticultural development, containing the choicest fruit-trees of North Africa, with ornamental trees of every shape, hue ... the spot, in the middle of a waste, is now the fairest, loveliest garden in Tripoli." It was known by guests who stayed there for lavish parties. It cost more than Warrington could afford and he unsuccessfully lobbied the English government to purchase it as an official residence.

== Role in the exploration of the Niger ==
At a time when British influence on the Barbary Coast was overshadowed by that of France, Hanmer Warrington nevertheless succeeded in developing a close relationship with the local ruler, known as the bashaw, Yusuf Karamanli. In 1817, at the instigation of John Barrow, the Second Secretary of the Admiralty, it was decided to attempt a mission to the Niger River via Tripoli. Two men were chosen to lead the expedition, Joseph Ritchie and George Francis Lyon. Due to the unpredictable nature of the tribal groups likely to be encountered, particularly the Tuareg, it was essential to obtain some measure of protection from the bashaw, at least as far south as his influence would reach. Warrington was able to convince the bashaw to give his permission for the expedition and enabled the explorers to accompany a caravan leaving in the general direction of Timbuktu. This expedition, which resulted in the death of Joseph Ritchie, failed even to reach Timbuktu.

== Second Niger expedition from Tripoli ==
John Barrow resolved to undertake a second expedition in order to build on the small achievements on the first. Warrington wrote to encourage this idea, saying that he would not hesitate to go himself, a challenge from which he was soon to demur. In 1822, Walter Oudney, Hugh Clapperton and Dixon Denham set out after much delay, once again with the help of Warrington who was able to convince a now doubtful bashaw that he should provide an armed escort. When the expedition faltered at the town of Murzuk, Warrington was called upon to provide more funds and once again use his influence with the bashaw. This expedition also broke down, leaving Oudney dead and Clapperton and Dixon at loggerheads.

== Third Niger expedition from Tripoli ==
The third and last Tripoli-based expedition was undertaken by Alexander Gordon Laing in 1825, once again with Warrington's considerable assistance. Several days before he left on what was to prove a fateful expedition, Laing married Warrington's daughter Emma. Laing succeeded in reaching the Niger and Timbuktu, but still could not ascertain the river's ultimate destination and was murdered shortly after leaving Timbuktu. At about the same time, Hugh Clapperton returned to the region, determined to beat Laing in finding the outlet of the Niger. Clapperton was accompanied by Richard Lemon Lander, whom he had hired as a servant and it was Lander who finally solved the puzzle of the Niger by sailing all the way down from Timbuktu to the Gulf of Guinea and the Niger delta.

== Final retirement ==
Hanmer Warrington finally retired in 1842. He died in Patras, Greece in 1847. His son Frederick Warrington succeeded him as British Consul in Tripoli and in 1845 played a role in one more expedition led by James Richardson, who was accompanied by the German geographer Heinrich Barth.

== Legacy ==
Historian Douglas Porch wrote that Warrington was a "garrulous old fool" who overestimated the local influence of Ottoman authorities and downplayed the dangers of desert travel, needlessly leading to the deaths of young explorers and delaying progress in European exploration of Africa.
