= Alexander Gordon Laing =

Scottish explorer (1794–1826)

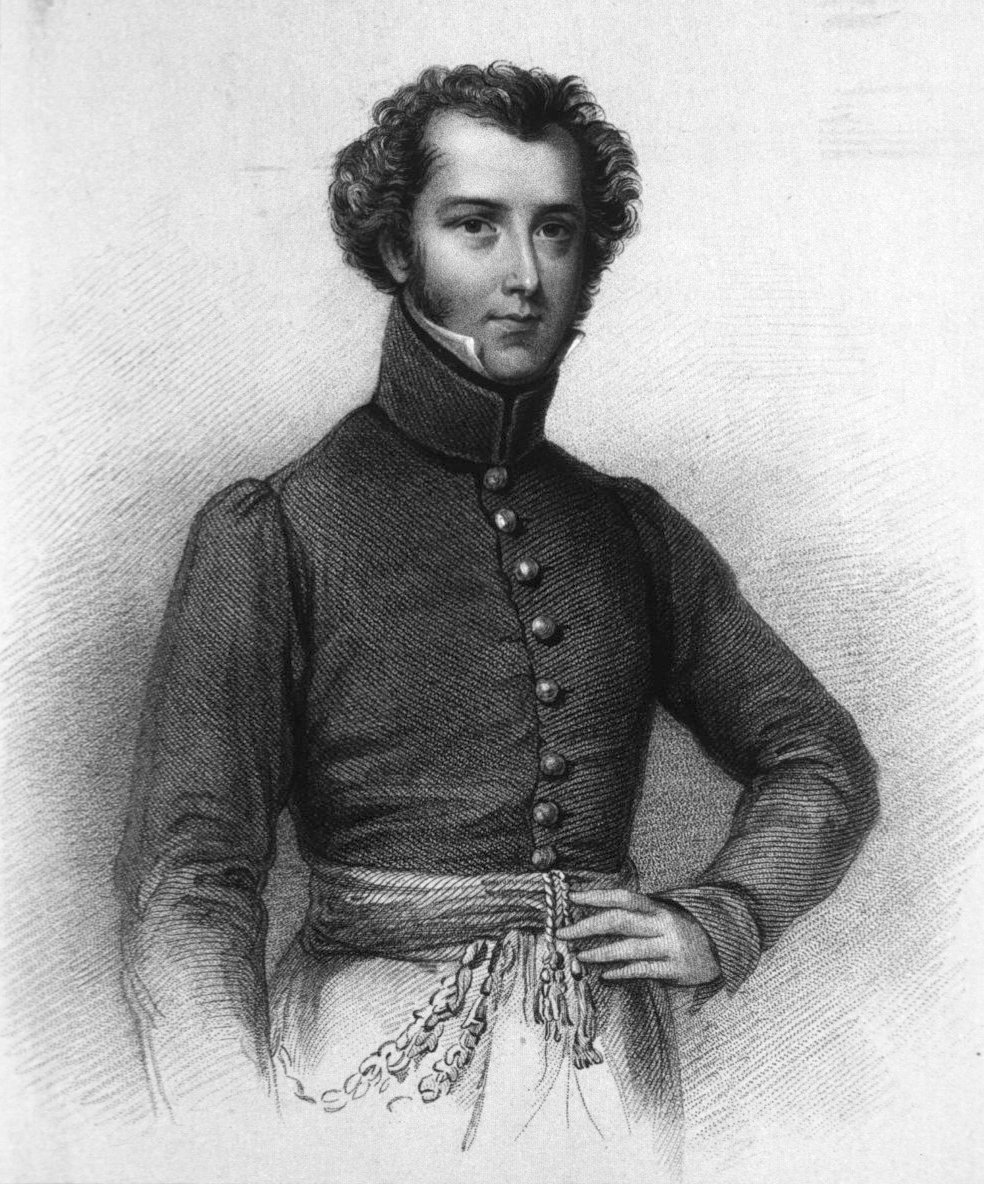
- Born: 27 December 1794; Edinburgh, Scotland, Great Britain
- Died: 26 September 1826 (aged 31); Araouane, Pashalik of Timbuktu
- Education: University of Edinburgh
- Occupations: Journalist, explorer

Major Alexander Gordon Laing (27 December 1794 – 26 September 1826) was a Scottish explorer and the first European to reach Timbuktu, arriving there via the north-to-south route in August 1826. He was killed five weeks after he departed Timbuktu.

== Early life ==
Laing was born in Edinburgh in late 1794. He was educated by his father, William Laing, who was a private teacher of classics, and at the University of Edinburgh. In 1811, he went to Barbados as clerk to his maternal uncle Colonel Gabriel Gordon.

== Military service ==
Through General Sir George Beckwith, the governor of Barbados, he obtained an ensigncy in the York Light Infantry Volunteers in 1813. He was promoted lieutenant without purchase in 1815 and transferred to the 2nd West India Regiment after his former regiment was disbanded in 1817. In 1822 he transferred into the Royal African Colonial Corps as a captain. In that year, while with his regiment at Sierra Leone, he was sent by the governor Sir Charles MacCarthy, to the Mandingo country, with the double object of opening up commerce and endeavouring to abolish the slave trade in that region. Later that year, Laing visited Falaba, the capital of the Solimana country, and ascertained the source of the Rokel. He endeavoured to reach the source of the Niger, but was stopped by the natives. He was, however, able to fix it with approximate accuracy.

In 1824 he was granted the local rank of major in Africa only. He took an active part in the Ashanti War of 1823-24, and was sent home with the despatches containing the news of the death in action of Sir Charles MacCarthy. While in England in 1824, Laing prepared a narrative of his journeys, which was published in 1825 and entitled Travels in the Timannee, Kooranko and Soolima Countries, in Western Africa.

== Trip to Timbuktu ==
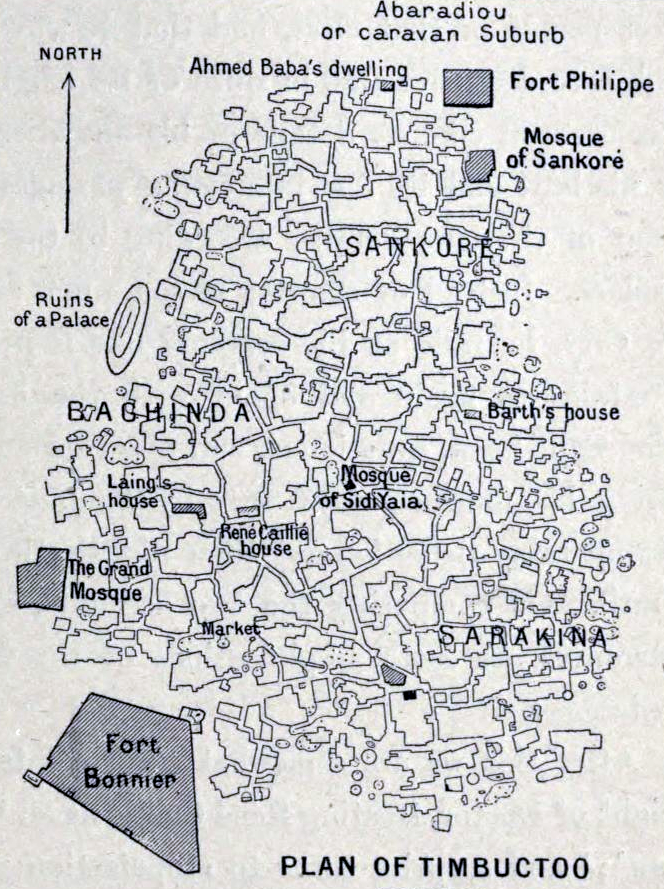
A plan of Timbuctoo around 1896, showing the house where Laing recuperated, between the Djinguereber and Sidi Yahya mosques

Laing believed he had found the source of the Niger and proposed to travel along the river to its delta. Joseph Banks, president of the African Association, supported his project, hoping that the expedition would reveal the location of Timbuktu. Henry, 3rd Earl Bathurst, then secretary for the colonies, instructed Captain Laing to undertake a journey, via Tripoli and Timbuktu, to further elucidate the hydrography of the Niger basin. Laing left England in February 1825, and at Tripoli on 14 July he married Emma Warrington, daughter of the British consul. Two days later, leaving his bride behind, he started to cross the Sahara, accompanied by a sheikh who was subsequently accused of planning his murder. Ghadames was reached, by an indirect route, in October 1825, and in December Laing reached In Salah in the Tuat territory, where he was well received by one particular group of Tuareg.

On 10 January 1826, he left Tuat and made for Timbuktu across the desert of Tanezrouft. Letters written in May and July told of his suffering from fever and the plundering of his caravan by another group of Tuareg. Laing describes being wounded in 24 places in the fighting. Together with another survivor, he managed to reach Sidi Al Muktar, penniless and having lost his right hand. He joined another caravan and reached Timbuktu, thus becoming the first modern European to cross the Sahara from north to south.

His letter dated from Timbuktu on 21 September announced his arrival in that city on the preceding 18 August, and the insecurity of his position owing to the hostility of the Fula chieftain Bello, then ruling the city. He added that he intended leaving Timbuktu in three days' time. No further news was received from the explorer. From information pieced together later, it was ascertained that he left Timbuktu on the day he had planned. Just after leaving the city, he was murdered by his own Arab escorts.

== Aftermath ==
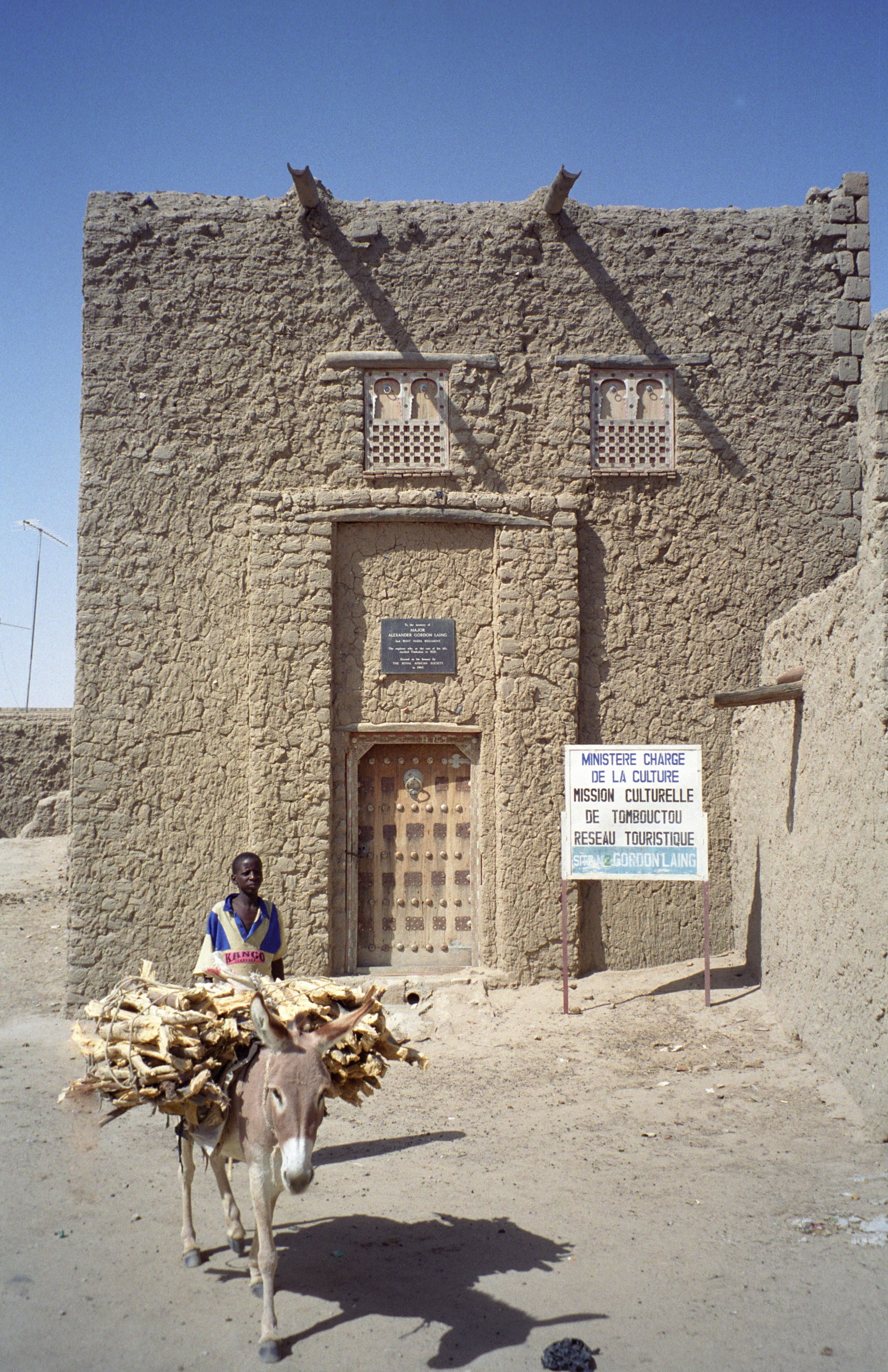
Gordon Laing's house in Timbuktu

Laing's papers were never recovered, and his father-in-law, Hanmer Warrington, accused the French (who also wanted to reach Timbuktu) of interference and having procured Laing's journal; however, there has never been any evidence for this. René Caillié reached Timbuktu two years after Laing and by returning alive was able to claim the 9,000-franc prize offered by the Société de Géographie for the feat. Both men were awarded the Gold Medal of the Society for 1830.

In 1903, the French government placed a tablet bearing Laing's name and the date of his visit on the house occupied by him during his 38-day stay in Timbuktu. This house, located in the Djingareiber district, inside the old town, was declared a National Heritage by decree of 18 December 1992.
