= Karim Keira =

Guinean politician

Minister
- President: Ahmed Sékou Touré

Personal details
- Died: 1985 Conakry
- Children: Alpha Ibrahima Keira; Fodéba Isto Keira
- Nickname: Albela

Karim Keira was a Guinean politician, the former Minister of the first republic of Guinea under the regime of Ahmed Sékou Touré.

He was executed in 1985 after the failed coup d'État of Diarra Traoré. Two of his children also went on to be ministers.

== Career ==
A former colonial administrator, after independence he became commander of the cercle of Mamou, and then Boké before returning to Conakry.

In 1969, he was named governor in Siguiri in place of Sékou Camara.

In 1970, he became secretary general to the Presidency of the Republic.

At the time of the death of Sékou Touré in 1984, he was Minister of Fisheries before being arrested and imprisoned under the second republic led by Lansana Conté until his death in 1985.
