= Falaba =

- Location in Sierra Leone
- Coordinates: 09°51′14″N 11°19′20″W
- Country: Sierra Leone
- Province: Northern Province
- District: Falaba District
- Established: 18th century

Population
  - Ethnicities: Yalunka people
  - Religions: Islam
- Time zone: UTC-5 (GMT)

Falaba is a rural town in Sulima Chiefdom, Falaba District in the Northern Province of Sierra Leone. The population of Falaba is largely from the Yalunka, Kuranko and couple of Mandingo ethnic groups. Falaba is virtually all Muslim and it is known for its deeply religious population. Farming is the major economic activity in Falaba.

== History ==
Falaba was the center of a small Yalunka polity in the 18th century, which eventually absorbed its neighbors to created the state of Solimana by 1800. A fortress town, it controlled rich trading routes to the western coast of Africa and was the judicial center of the kingdom. It was visited in 1822 by Alexander Gordon Laing, who estimated that the population of the town ranged between 6,000 and 10,000 people. In 1869 William Winwood Reade visited, leaving the following description of the town and its defensive stockage of hundreds of massive silk cotton trees:

On arriving at the top of a small hill the people stood still, and pointing with their hands, pronounced the word Falaba! I saw beneath me a beautiful plain covered with sheep and goats and red cattle, and a black avenue of trees marking the course of a river. In the midst of this plain was a large grove, as it seemed, of gigantic silk-cotton trees; and on looking more carefully I perceived now and then a brown roof between the foliage. At the same time I heard the distant booming of a drum...We entered and were led a roundabout way, that we might be impressed with the size of the town.

In 1884, Mandinka conqueror Samori joined the king of Kaliere in attacking Solimana, then under the rule of Manga Sewa. After Samori's general N'fa Ali destroyed a number of surrounding villages, the Mandingo forces began a five-month siege of Falaba itself. With the city's residents starved nearly to death, Manga Sewa could not bear the starvation of his people and for the mere fact that he was being compromised by their neighbouring villages he vowed never to surrender himself to Samouri's army, so he decided to go into the gunpowder house to commit suicide by lighting it up, his wife said she would not sleep with any other man beside her husband (Manga Sewa), his Yaeliba (a person who sing and praises Kings and great people) also decided to join him in the gunpowder thus saying he would not praise any other King, so they both entered the Falaba gunpowder magazine and lit a torch, simultaneously killing himself and breaching Falaba's walls. Falaba was then briefly assimilated into Samori's Wassoulou Empire; following Samori's own fall several years later, it was reclaimed by the British.

The Anglo-French treaty of 1895 left the town without an affluent hinterland, and the colonial administrative post was moved from Falaba to Kabala. As a result, Falaba declined after 1895. Falaba was situated approximately thirty miles north-east of Kabala.

=== Civil War ===
Reports indicate that fighting in Falaba during the Sierra Leone Civil War of the 1990s caused most people to flee the town. In a press report of May 27, 1998, one witness said "the towns of Falaba, Sinkunia, Musaia-Mongo Bendugu, Krubonia, Bafodia and Yiffin had all been partly or totally destroyed". The roads and bridges into Fabala were also almost totally destroyed, and the town very severely damaged, according to a post-war damage survey. An air survey in 2001 reported Falaba as a "village".

== R.M.S. Falaba ==
The British R.M.S. Falaba, a West African steamship, was hit and sunk by a U-boat torpedo in 1915. It was the first passenger ship sunk during World War I. Leon Thrasher, an American citizen, died on the Falaba, and his body was found after the Lusitania sank (Thrasher incident).
