= Moses Musa Sesay =

Sierra Leonean politician

Moses Sesay was the mayor of the City of Makeni in the Bombali district of Northern Sierra Leone.

Sesay is the sixth of eleven children born to Edward Sallu Sesay and 'Tha' Kadiatu Sesay presently residents at the Azzolini Highway, Magbente Junction; in the outskirts of the City of Makeni.

Sesay was elected at the recently concluded lllLocal lllGovernment lllElections on 5 July 2008. A formal handing over from the outgoing Mayor Alhaji Andrew Kanu took place early in August after the official inauguration of all the elected Councillors; chairmen and the mayor, of the Region.

Sesay was defeated by Sunkari Kabba-Kamara in the 2012 APC primary election.
