= Wara-Wara Bafodia Chiefdom =

Wara-Wara Bafodia is a chiefdom in Koinadugu District of Sierra Leone with a population of 25,713. Its principal/capital town is Bafodia.

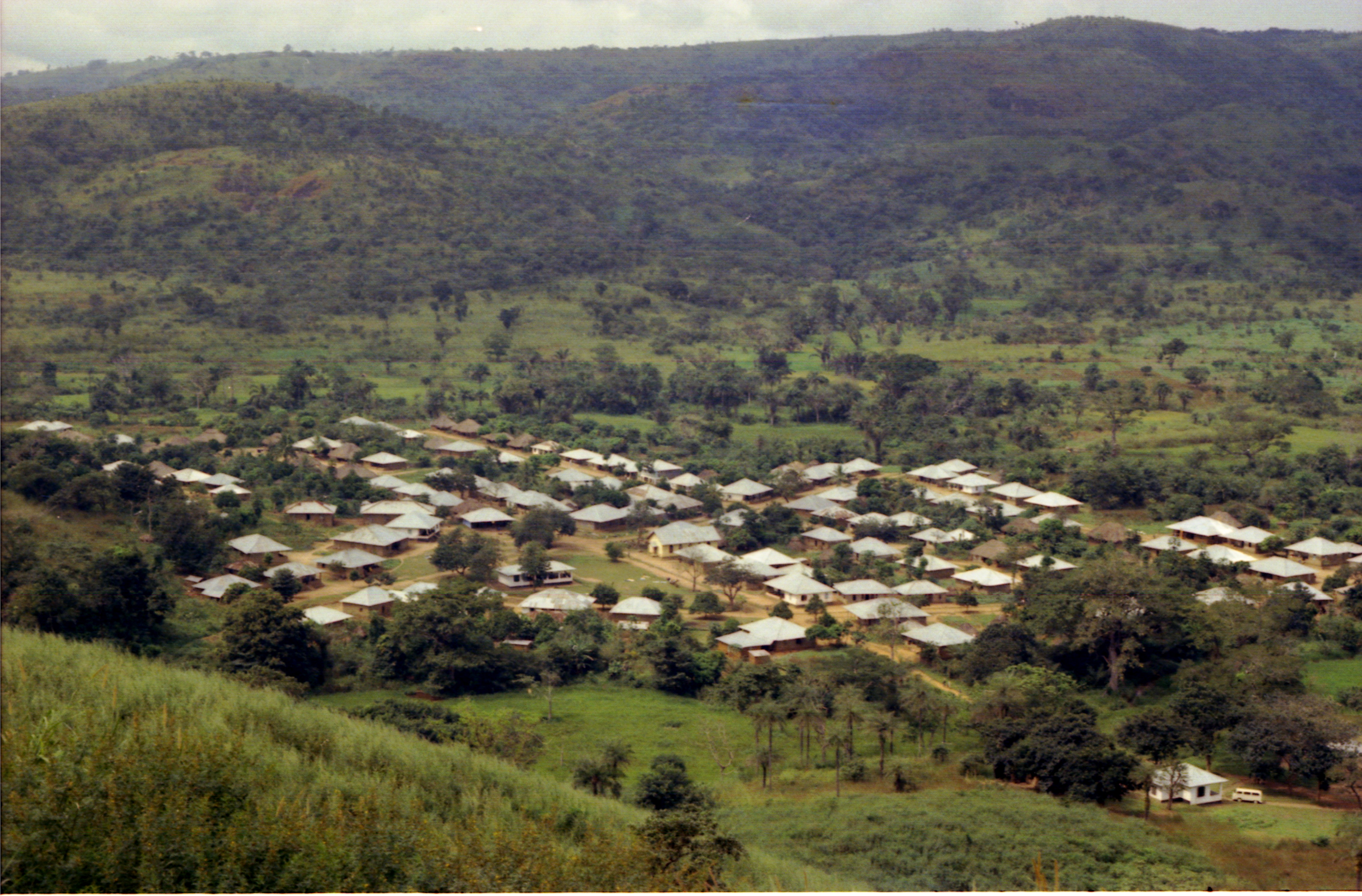
Bafodia Town in 1967.
