= Wara-Wara Yagala Chiefdom =

- Chiefdom
- Country: Sierra Leone
- Province: Northern Province
- District: Koinadugu District
- Capital: Gbawuria
- Time zone: UTC+0 (GMT)

Wara-Wara Yagala Chiefdom is a chiefdom in Koinadugu District of Sierra Leone. Its capital is Gbawuria.
