= Yalunka people =

Ethnic group of West Africa

Yalunka
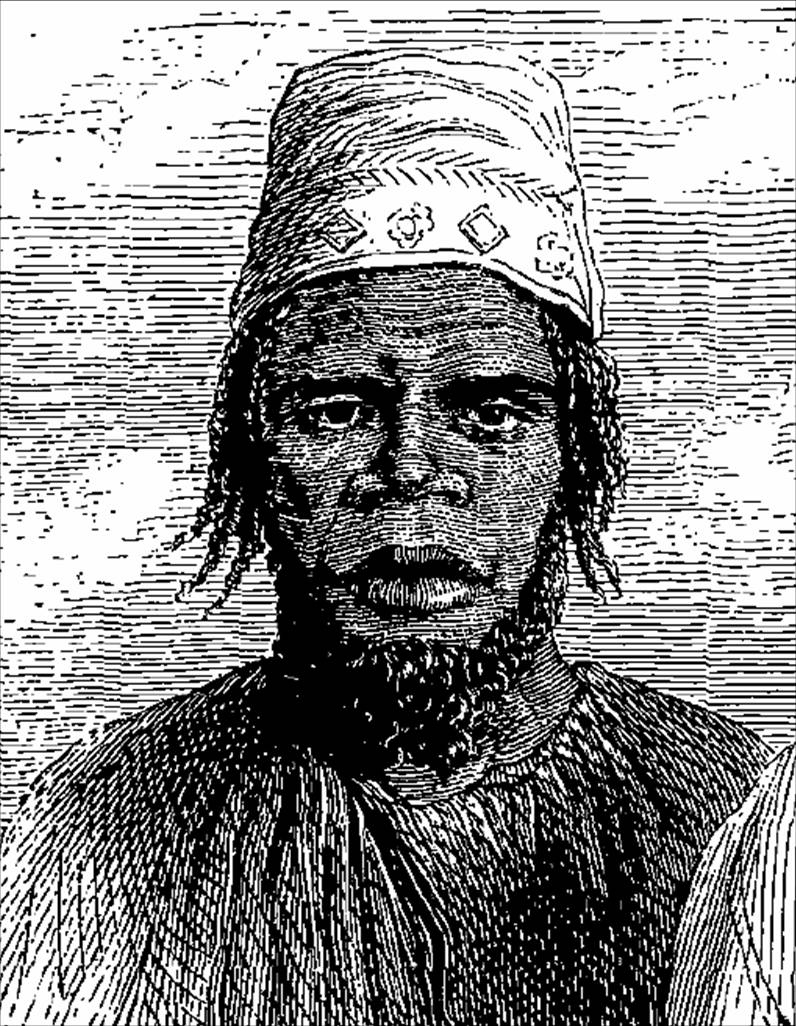
- Portrait of a Yalunka (1861)

Total population
- Over 300.000

Regions with significant populations
- Guinea: 131,000
- Senegal: 136,000
- Sierra Leone: 52,000
- Mali: 19,000

Languages
- Yalunka, French

Religion
- Sunni Islam

Related ethnic groups
- Susu people, Soninke people, Mikhifore people, Jakhanke people,

The Yalunka, or Dialonké, are a Mandé-speaking people and the original inhabitants of Futa Jallon (French: Fouta Djallon), a mountainous region in Guinea, West Africa. The Yalunka people live primarily in Guinea, particularly in Faranah, while smaller communities are found in Kouroussa. Additional Yalunka are also located in northeastern Sierra Leone, southeastern Senegal, and southwestern Mali.

The Yalunka are a branch of the Mandé peoples. They are closely related to the Susu people, and some scholars classify the two as one group. The Yalunka are notable for having first converted to Islam, but then renouncing Islam en masse when Muslim Fula people began dominating their region. In the eighteenth century, many of the Yalunka's were displaced from the Futa Jallon. The Yalunka fought against the Fula jihads, left Futa Jallon, migrating south to the foothills of the mountains in Mamou or east to live amongst the Mandinka people of Upper Guinea, others migrated and established new towns such as Falaba near the region where Rokel River starts, while the remaining of the Yalunka went further into the mountains to settle among the Kuranko, Limba and Kissi people. In the midst some were raided by Almamy Samori Toure during the Wassoulou Empire expansion. Ultimately, The Yalunka were subdued and absorbed by the Imamate of Futa Jallon.

They speak the Yalunka language, which belongs to the Mande branch of the Niger–Congo language family. Yalunka is mutually intelligible with Susu language.

== Ethnonymy ==
The Yalunka people are referred to as Jalonca, Jalonga, Jalonka, Jalooke, Jalonke, Jalunka, Jalunke, Jellonke, Yalanka, Yalonga, Yalounka, Yalunga, Yalonka, Yalonke, Yalunke, Dialanké, Dialinké, Dialonka, Dialonque, Djallonké, Djallonka, Djallounké, Djallounka, Dyalonké, Dyalonka, or Dialonké.

The meaning of the term Dialonké," literally means 'inhabitants of the mountains.' Jallon meaning 'mountain' in the Yalunka language and which name only Futa carries in contemporary extends from the northeast of Siguiri to the mountainous massif of Futa. Jallon is a name that portrays a situation of pride, unlike authors such as André Arcin have claimed, derived from the surname Diallo of the Fulani.

== History ==
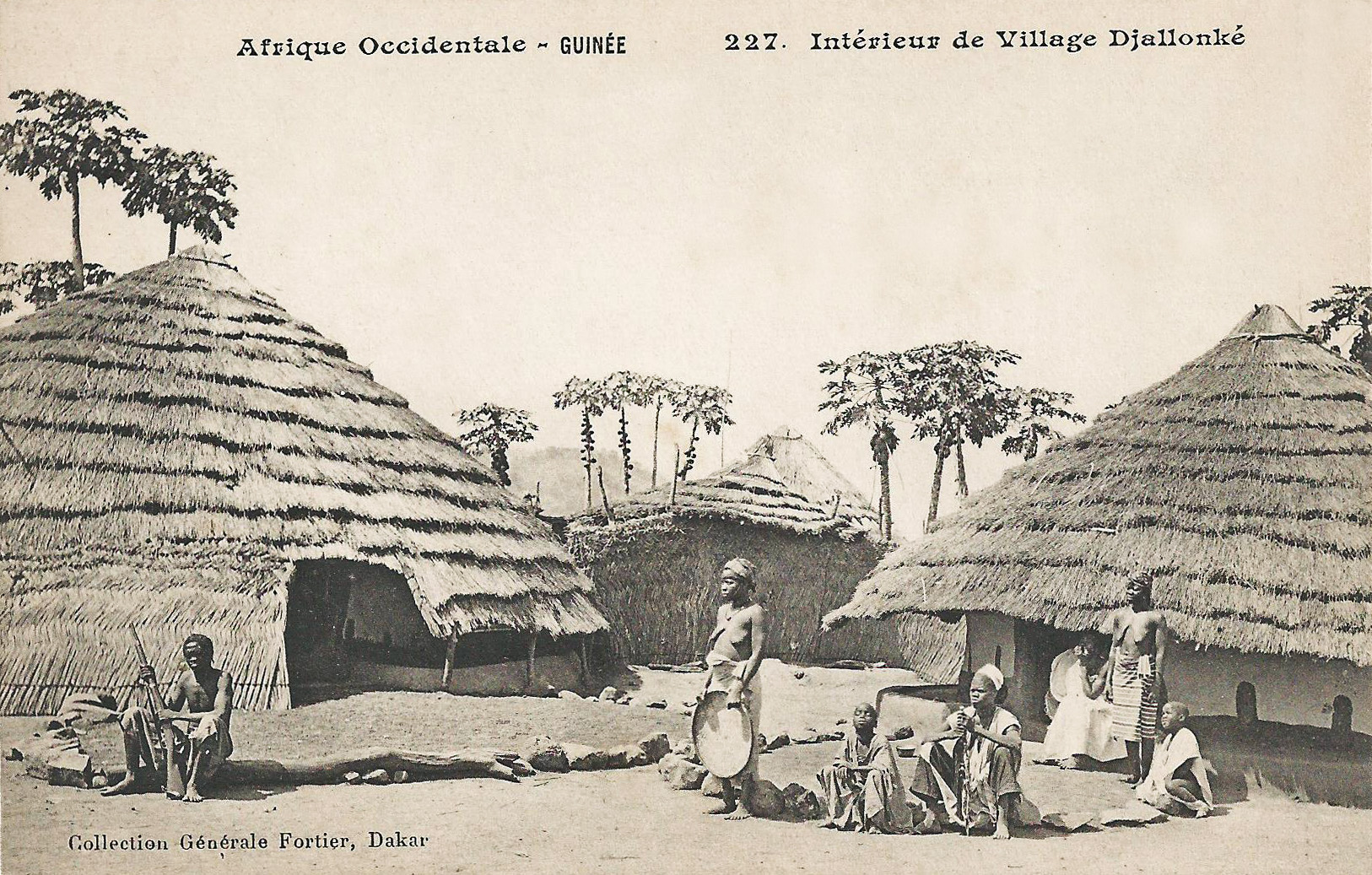
The interior of a Yalunka village

The Yalunka people originated in the mountainous Koulikoro along the Niger River valley. According to Susu oral tradition, they Identify the Yalunka with the medieval Sosso Empire of Soumaoro Kanté. The earliest evidence suggests that sometime around the eleventh century, the Yalunka people arrived in the hilly plateau region of the Futa Jallon in Guinea, since the disintegration of the Sosso Empire. The Yalunka people were agricultural animists and among the first settlers in Jallonkadu, the former name in what eventually became Futa Jallon. At first, the Yalunka accepted Islam. After the seventeenth century, Islamic theocracies supported by the Fula people began a period of Fula dominance and their version of Islam in the region traditionally occupied by the Yalunka. The Yalunka people, along with the Susu people, then renounced Islam. The Fula people and their leaders, such as Karamokho Alfa and Ibrahima Sori, launched a series of jihads targeted against the Yalunka in the eighteenth century. The Yalunka were defeated, subdued, and returned to Islam in 1778. The jihads contributed immensely to the Solima Yalunka state's creation in Guinea and Sierra Leone's northeastern boundary in the nineteenth century. In the time of the Yalunka's desolation, Almamy Samori Touré collaborated with the Fulani, French, and Toucouleur allies, against the Yalunka people, In the process Samori Touré consistently attacked the Yalunka.

== Society and culture ==
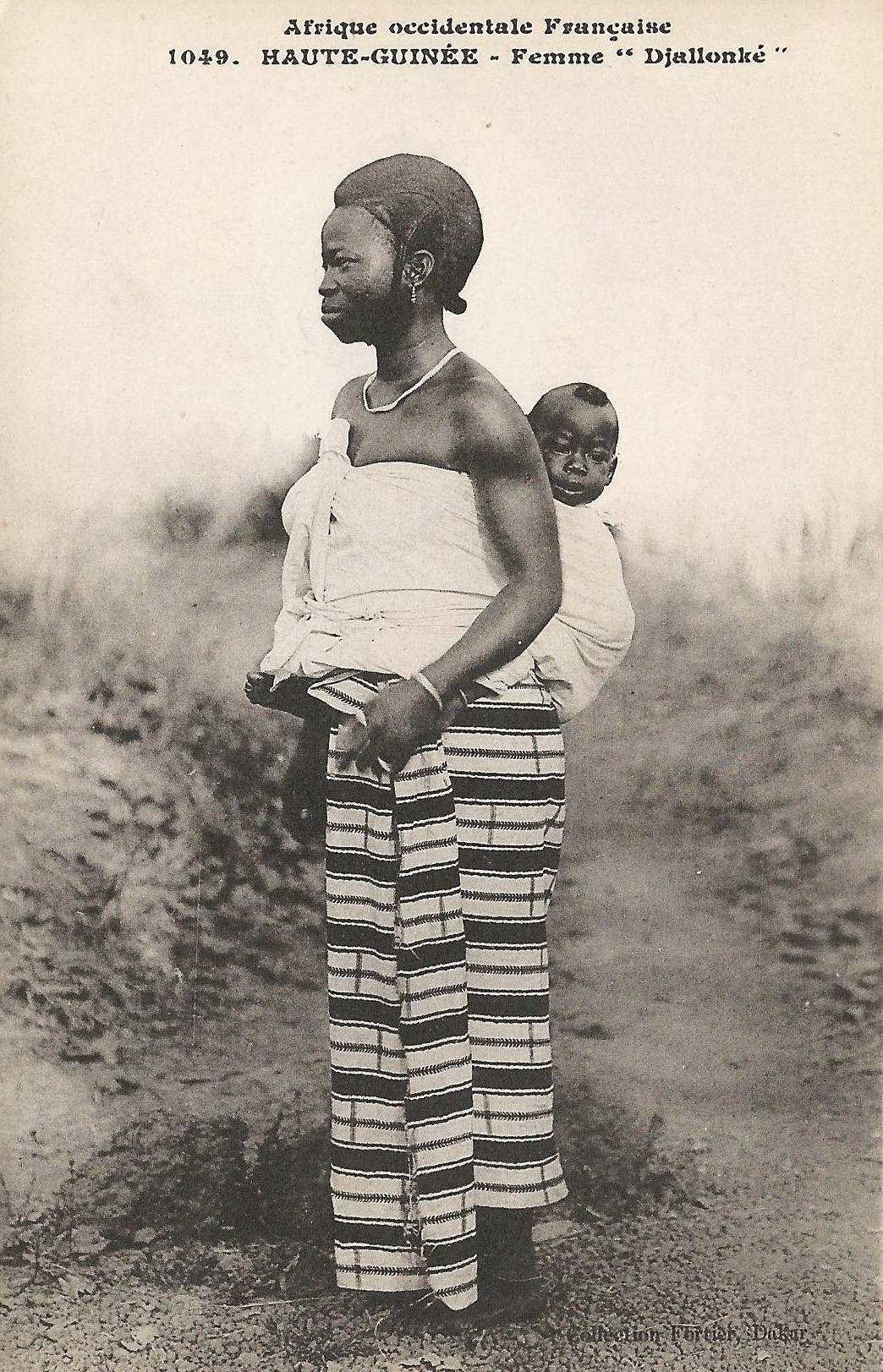
A Yalunka woman from Upper Guinea in 1905

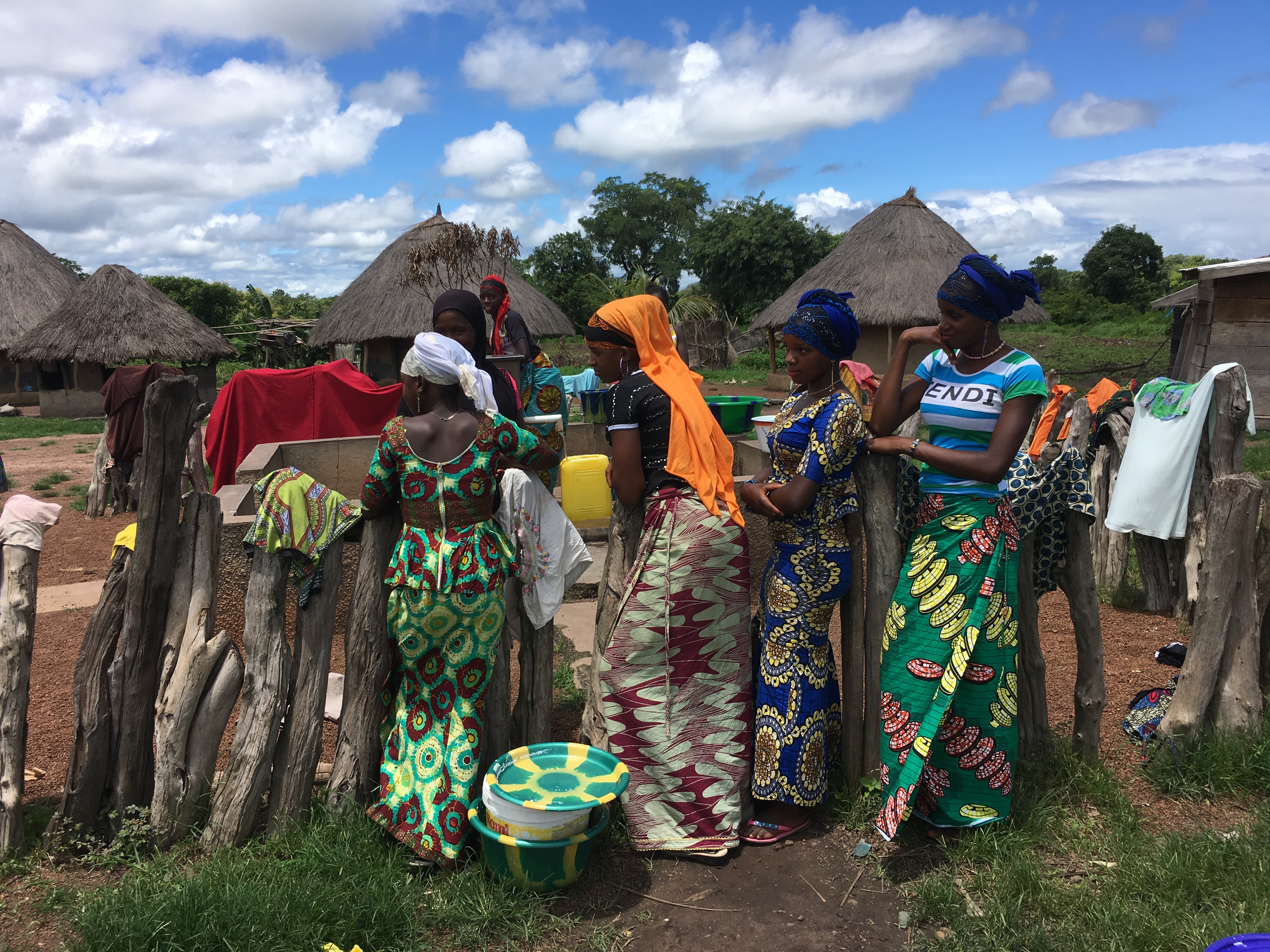
Yalunka women from Kondébou

The Yalunka are predominantly Muslim and are considered devout. At the same time, they have retained many pre-Islamic beliefs and practices, combining the two in a syncretic way. One of their traditional practice is Barinkiina, which involves making sacrifices in memory of their ancestors to gain power. They also make sacrifices for Suxurena and Nyinanna, or nature spirits, to gain powers.

The New Testament was translated into the Yalunka language by Pioneer Bible Translators's current president, Greg Pruett in 2013.

The Yalunka people commonly practice polygyny. Arranged marriages are their traditional practice, and they follow the Islamic law that a man may have up to four living wives. The first wife has seniority and authority over the wives he marries later. The husband, according to Bankole Taylor, "has complete control over his wives and is responsible for feeding and clothing them".

The Yalunka society is patriarchal, consisting of households headed by a man, his wife or wives, and their unmarried children. Extended households form a compound, which may consist of two or more married men from the same father and their families, each living in a separate hut.

The Yalunka people also utilize practices of the Bondo secret society which aims at gradually but firmly establishing attitudes related to adulthood in girls, discussions on fertility, morality and proper sexual comportment. The society also maintains an interest in the well-being of its members throughout their lives.

The Yalunka are primarily subsistence farmers, with rice and millet being their staple crops. Peanuts, sweet potatoes, maize, and beans are also grown. Chickens, herds of cattle, and flocks of sheep and goats are kept. Goats and cattle provide milk as a food source, which is used directly and processed for cheese and other products. This livestock, such as goats and cattle, is significant as a marker of wealth and because they serve as bride-price payments. The boy's family gives animals to the girl's family before the marriage takes place—these animals are used as a means of economic exchange.

Among the Yalunka, herding is done by the children. The women milk the cattle and help the men in some of the agricultural work.

The Yalunka live in larger settlements established since the eighteenth century. The Yalunka region is mixed savannah and forest. The country is hilly, and most of it is 1,000 to 2,000 feet above sea level. Most Yalunka settlements are located in the valleys between the hills. Since the 1950s, many Yalunka have migrated to cities to find work.

=== Yalunka patronyms ===
Some Yalunka surnames are:

- Camara
- Dandiokho
- Danfakha
- Dangnökho
- Dansokho
- Diawara
- Keira or Kèrra
- Kondjira
- Makhanéra
- Monêkhata
- Niakhasso
- Nomokho
- Sakhânökho
- Samoura
- Singoura

== Notable Yalunka people ==
- Tibou Kamara, Guinean politician
- Oumar Kalabane, Guinean footballer
- Fodéba Isto Keira, Guinean minister
- Karim Keira, Guinean politician
- Thiniba Samoura, French footballer
- Sorious Samura, Sierra Leonean journalist
- Manga Sewa, 19th century Yalunka chief in Northern Sierra Leone
- Soumba Toumany, was a Yalunka elephant hunter and founded the Kingdom of Dubréka
