= Fodéba Isto Keira =

Guinean politician (born 1961)

Secretary General of the Ministry of Sports, Culture and Historical Patrimony
- Incumbent
- Assumed office 2016
- President: Alpha Condé
- Prime Minister: Ibrahima Kassory Fofana

Minister of Arts and Culture
- In office 2009–2010
- President: Sékouba Konaté
- Prime Minister: Jean-Marie Doré

Minister of Youth, Sports and youth employment
- In office 2008–2009
- President: Moussa Dadis Camara
- Prime Minister: Kabiné Komara

Director general of the Guinean Office of Publicity
- In office 2007–2008

Director general of the Guinean Entertainment Agency
- In office 1999–2007

Personal details
- Born: 4 June 1961 (age 64) Conakry
- Relations: Alpha Ibrahima Keira
- Parent: Karim Keira (father)
- Education: Université Gamal Abdel Nasser de Conakry

Fodeba Isto Keira (born 4 June 1961 in Conakry) is a Guinean politician and cultural figure. He is a former Minister of Youth, Sports and youth employment and current Secretary general of the Ministry of Culture, Sports and Historical Patrimony since 2016.

== Biography ==
Born in Conakry, he began his education at the primary school Place des martyrs de Conakry where he obtained his certificate of primary education in 1976.

Fodeba Isto Keira achieved his BEPC (Brevet de fin d'étude de premier cycle), then the first and second part of the Baccalauréat at the collège et lycée Boulbinet.

In 1981, after his Baccalauréat, he joined the faculty of social sciences (FASSONAD) at Donka in the Philosophy Department from which he graduated with a diploma in Philosophy in 1986.

== Career ==
=== Private sector ===
He began his career in Côte d’Ivoire working in companies specializing in laboratory equipment such as Groupe ETEC and ABAQUE CI.

After two years outside the country, Isto Keira returned to Guinea. By 1988 he had been recruited by the Société Nouvelle d’Assurance de Guinée (SONAG), and then by the Société des Boissons Naturelles de Guinée (BONAGUI).

=== Public sector ===
Between 1999 and 2007, Isto Keira was General Director of the Agence Guinéenne de Spectacle (AGS) under the presidency of general Lansana Conté and subsequently was Chief of Staff at the Guinean Public Relations Office (OGP).

During the transition of power in 2008, then-captain Moussa Dadis Camara named him Minister of Youth, Sports and youth employment. He was subsequently named Minister of Arts and Culture by general Sékouba Konaté in 2009, in the government of jean Marie Doré.

In 2016, Fodeba Isto Keira was named Chief of Staff of the Ministry of Culture, Sports and Historical Patrimony under the regime of president Alpha Condé.

== Prizes and awards ==
- 2017: He received the medal of cultural merit during the Fiftieth anniversary of the Republic of Guinea,
- 2017: recipient of the International Olympic Committee prize.

== Cultural figure ==
Fodeba Isto Keira is an international cultural consultant, producer of the festival international des Voix féminines (FIVOFEM), co-producer of the Djembe d’Or, producer delegated from the salon international de la musique africaine (SIMA) and president of the Office of Export of African Music (bureau export de la musique africaine) (BEMA).

== Private life ==
His first name comes from the former minister Fodéba Keita, founder of the Les Ballets Africains.
