= Kuranko people =

Ethnic group in Sierra Leone and Guinea

Kuranko
Total population
- over 2 million

Regions with significant populations
- Guinea: 2,000,000
- Sierra Leone: 313,384

Languages
- Kuranko, French, English, Krio

Religion
- Predominately Islam

Related ethnic groups
- Lele people, Mikhifore people, Susu people, Yalunka people, Mandinka people, other Mandé peoples

The Kuranko, also called Koranko, Kolanko, Kooranko, Koronko, Kouranko, Kulanko, Kurako, Kuronko, Kuranké, or Karanko, are a Mandeka (people from Mande) people that occupy a large section in a mountainous region within northeastern Sierra Leone and southern Guinea. Within this geographical region, different dialects, as well as distinct social groupings can be found. In general, the Koranko are a peaceful people who have maintained a separate ethnic identity, despite years of tribal mixings. Each Kuranko village is led by a chief and a group of elders.

The Koranko speak the Kuranko language (or Koranko), a dialect of the Mande branch of the Niger–Congo language family. The Kuranko are nominally an Islamic people, but many people in this isolated area still follow traditional religious beliefs, identifying as Muslim without adhering to all the strict protocols of that religion. The Kuranko speak a language similar to the Manding languages, and their language can be understood by their neighbours and close allies the Mandinka and the Susu people.

The Kuranko occupy a mountainous region within the northeastern Sierra Leone highlands, extending into Guinea. This region lacks adequate road systems and is not easily accessible, leaving the Kuranko socially isolated. This may explain why most Kuranko have held on to their traditional culture and religion.

== History ==
The Kuranko moved into the territory of present-day Sierra Leone from Mande in what is now Mali, after some leadership struggles in the Empire. The Kuranko's were the rulers and military leaders during the night of the empire. Due to the vastness of the empire, and their role in the military, they were deployed across East to West Africa. One of the most prominent military group led by warrior Mansa Kama, who lived approximately between 1650 and 1720. Was in charge of securing the west African trade route to the port in present day Freetown. Mansa Kama founded Kamadugu, now contained within the Sengbe Chiefdom of Koinadugu District, as well as Kholifa, which is still a chiefdom to this day, and extended his rule across Sierra Leone, Foredugu to the port in Koya (Queen Elizabeth II Queue). Kama travelled widely across the area with an Islamic alfa in the late 1600s, encountering numerous military battles on the way. This included establishing the town of Kamadugu, which is named after him. Eventually he settled in Rowala, which became the centre of the new Kuranko country, where he remained the leader until his death.

== Economy ==
The Kuranko are primarily a hunting and trading people, with these activities exceeding farming as their primary employment. Since their origins were in the savanna lands, they have taken active measures to preserve their habitat as this type, including setting fires as part of the hunting process, to ensure that large plant life and woodland does not dominate. As the Kuranko have moved south over time, so they have maintained this savanna and burning lifestyle, leading to a gradual southward moving of the limit of the savanna lands. (This narrative is limited to the Mansa Kama era. However, the Kuranko history goes beyond the Kama, who was a newcomer to the scene at that time. this story needs to be told from the real Kuranko history perspective.)

== Culture and customs ==
Men in the Kuranko culture undergo various initiation rituals on reaching puberty, becoming members of a secretive "club" when they do so. The initiation consists of a circumcision, training sessions, and the right to wear certain articles of clothing. Once initiated, men are free to marry, paying a bride price to the family of the chosen woman. The Kuranko are polygamous, and some men have more than one wife.

The Kuranko people also utilize practices of the Bondo secret society which aims at gradually but firmly establishing attitudes related to adulthood in girls, discussions on fertility, morality and proper sexual comportment. The society also maintains an interest in the well-being of its members throughout their lives.

== Religious and traditional beliefs ==
The Kuranko lands were one of the first areas of Sierra Leone to adopt Islam as its religion, and many Kuranko are nominally Muslim. However, the region is very isolated, and many of the more formal aspects of the Islamic faith are not adhered to. The people are also not politically Islamic, with the dichotomy between Catholic and Islamic African populations, not a major issue here.

In place of formal Islam, the people continue to believe in many aspects of their ancient religion.

The Kuranko believe that in the forests, the rivers, and the mountains live quasi-human beings known as Nyenne. These are "bush spirits," who are believed to influence Kuranko's life in different ways. Ancestral spirit and natural ecosystem forms the core of the Kuranko spiritual life

=== Kuranko patronyms ===
- Marah all the kuranko came from marah
- Kagbo
- Sanoh
- Kaloko
- Koroma
- Dörrèh or Doré

== Notable Kuranko people ==
- Mansa Kama, a great Kuranko warrior of northeast Sierra Leone
- IBRAHIM FRANCIS MARAH SIERRA LEONEAN/Gospel musician and Developmental young man since the history of kurankoya contact him +23275012311
- Karefa Kargbo, Sierra Leonean politician
- Kaifala Marah, former Minister of Finance of Sierra Leone
- Aminata Kamissoko, Guinean musician
- Augustus Kargbo, Sierra Leonean footballer
- Ibrahim Kargbo, Sierra Leonean footballer
- Kamso Mara, Guinean footballer
- Mamoudou Mara, Guinean footballer
- Mohamed Mara, Guinean footballer
- Fantacee Wiz, Sierra Leonean musician
- Bal Tamba, Sierra Leonean, King of Barawa Ferawa
- Kalma Kumba Samba, Sierra Leonean, warrior and Hunter
- Bolka Dan, Sierra Leonean,
