= Fatima Massaquoi =

Liberian educator (1911–1978)

- Born: Fatima Beendu Sandimanni Massaquoi; 25 December 1912; Gendema, Sierra Leone Colony and Protectorate
- Died: 26 November 1978 (aged 65); Monrovia, Liberia
- Other name: Fatima Massaquoi-Fahnbulleh
- Education: University of Hamburg; Lane College; Fisk University; Boston University
- Occupation: educator
- Years active: 1946–72
- Notable work: The Autobiography of an African Princess

Fatima Massaquoi-Fahnbulleh (/ˈmæsækwɑː/; 25 December 1911 – 26 November 1978) was a Liberian writer and academic. After completing her education in the United States, she returned to Liberia in 1946, making significant contributions to the cultural and social life of the country.

Born into a family of Gallinas royalty, Massaquoi grew up in the care of an aunt in Njagbacca, in the Garwula District of Grand Cape Mount County of southern Liberia. After seven years, she returned to the northwestern part of the country, Montserrado County, where she began her schooling. In 1922 she accompanied her father, a diplomat, to Hamburg, Germany, where she completed her school education and started a course in biology at the University of Hamburg. In 1937 she moved to the United States for further education, studying sociology and anthropology at Lane College, Fisk University and Boston University. While in the US, she collaborated on a dictionary of the Vai language and wrote her autobiography, though a legal battle ensued over the rights to her story. She won an injunction barring others from publishing it, and returned to Liberia in 1946, immediately beginning collaboration to establish a university there, which would become the University of Liberia.

Committed to national cultural preservation and expansion, Massaquoi served as the director, later dean, of the Liberal Arts College and was the founding director of the Institute of African Studies. She co-founded the Society of Liberian Authors, helped abolish the practice of usurping African names for Westernized versions, and worked towards standardization of the Vai script. In the late 1960s, Vivian Seton, Massaquoi's daughter, had the autobiographical manuscript microfilmed for preservation. After Massaquoi's death, her writings and notes were rediscovered, edited and published in 2013 as The Autobiography of an African Princess.

== Early life and education ==
Massaquoi was born in Gendema in the Pujehun District of southern Sierra Leone in 1911 (others give the date as 1904), the daughter of Momolu Massaquoi, who in 1922 became Liberia's consul general in Hamburg, Germany, and Massa Balo Sonjo. At birth, she was given the name Fatima Beendu Sandimanni, but dropped the Beendu before it became part of her records. Her paternal grandfather was King Lahai Massaquoi of the Gallinas, and her paternal grandmother was Queen Sandimannie (or Sandimani) of Sierra Leone's aristocratic Vai family. She was also the great-great-granddaughter of King Siaka of Gendema who ruled over the Gallinas in the 18th century.

Massaquoi spent her first seven years with her father's sister, Mama Jassa, in Njagbacca in the Garwula District of Grand Cape Mount County. While she was there, one of her father's six wives, Ma Sedia, seriously injured Fatima's hands for a misdemeanor. This caused her considerable pain throughout her childhood, hampering her ability to play the violin. She later became a highly competent player, though she remained self-conscious about the scarring even as an adult. After elementary school, she was sent to boarding school at Julia C. Emery Hall, attached to the Bromley Mission near Clay-Ashland in Montserrado County.

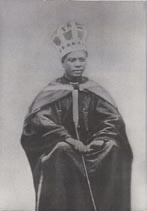
Momolu Massaquoi (c.1905)

Momolu Massaquoi sought to give his favourite child, and only daughter, the very best education. She went with him to Hamburg in 1922, where she lived at the consulate at 22 Johnsallee. Receiving her primary school education at St. Anschar Höhere Mädchenschule, Massaquoi quickly mastered German. On the recommendation of the consulate's housekeeper, Gertrude von Bobers, to whom she became very attached, in 1932 she spent some time in Geneva, Switzerland, where she learnt French at the École Supérieure et Secondaire. The same year, she returned to Hamburg, attending the Helene Lange Schule, where she received her school leaving certificate in 1935. She then started to study medicine at the University of Hamburg but broke this off when she left Germany.

Hans J. Massaquoi, her nephew, who was in Hamburg during the same period, recounts that "Tante Fatima" dressed exotically in African clothing, proudly maintained her African habits and spoke the Vai language. One of her fondest friends in Hamburg was Richard Heydorn, a pianist, with whom she gave many recitals. An opponent of Nazism, when war broke out he was sent to Russia, and was later reported missing in action. Being part of the first black diplomatic family in Germany had always been challenging, but with the rise of the Nazi regime, Massaquoi's father began fearing for her safety. With the assistance of friends, he helped her relocate to the United States to avoid the Aryan policies and restrictions placed on women.

== Years in the United States ==
Massaquoi arrived that same year in the United States and experienced the racial segregation and Jim Crow laws of the Southern States. She first attended Lane College in Jackson, Tennessee, graduating in sociology. Two years later she moved to Fisk University in Nashville earning two master's degrees, first in sociology and then in anthropology in 1944. She assisted her professor, Mark Hanna Watkins, in his understanding of the Vai language, cooperating with him in compiling a Vai dictionary. She agreed to accept a fellowship as a linguistic advisor, after her father died in 1938. She taught French and German at Fisk and also paid her way by giving instruction in African and European folk dancing, as well as teaching the violin, thanks to her own competence on the instrument.

In 1940, Massaquoi finished writing an autobiographical account of her early life as a tribal child, her life experiences with Europeans and education in Germany and Switzerland, and impressions of America. Watkins told her the English was too poor for publication, but later he claimed in a 1944 letter that she had written the account upon his insistence. While awaiting the editing, Massaquoi continued helping the school prepare a dictionary on the Vai language, teaching cultural dance and language, but was unhappy with the arrangement which paid only a small sum. When she attempted to retrieve her manuscript, Watkins refused and she sued the university for its return and to bar them from publishing her works. In 1945, she won a permanent injunction against Watkins, Dr. Thomas E. Jones, president of the university, and Fisk University prohibiting them from publishing or receiving any financial rewards from any publication of the work. Massaquoi felt that she had been "conspired against" because she was foreign and a presumption that she did not have the strength to fight for her rights.

In 1946 while at Boston University, Massaquoi completed editing the autobiography (which was originally titled Bush to Boulevard: The Autobiography of a Vai Noblewoman). Thanks to her extensive travels and education, by this time, she spoke several languages—at least eight and four tribal dialects. In addition to her native Vai and Mende, she spoke English, which she had first learnt at school in Liberia, German from her many years in Hamburg, and French from her schooling in Switzerland.

== Return to Liberia ==
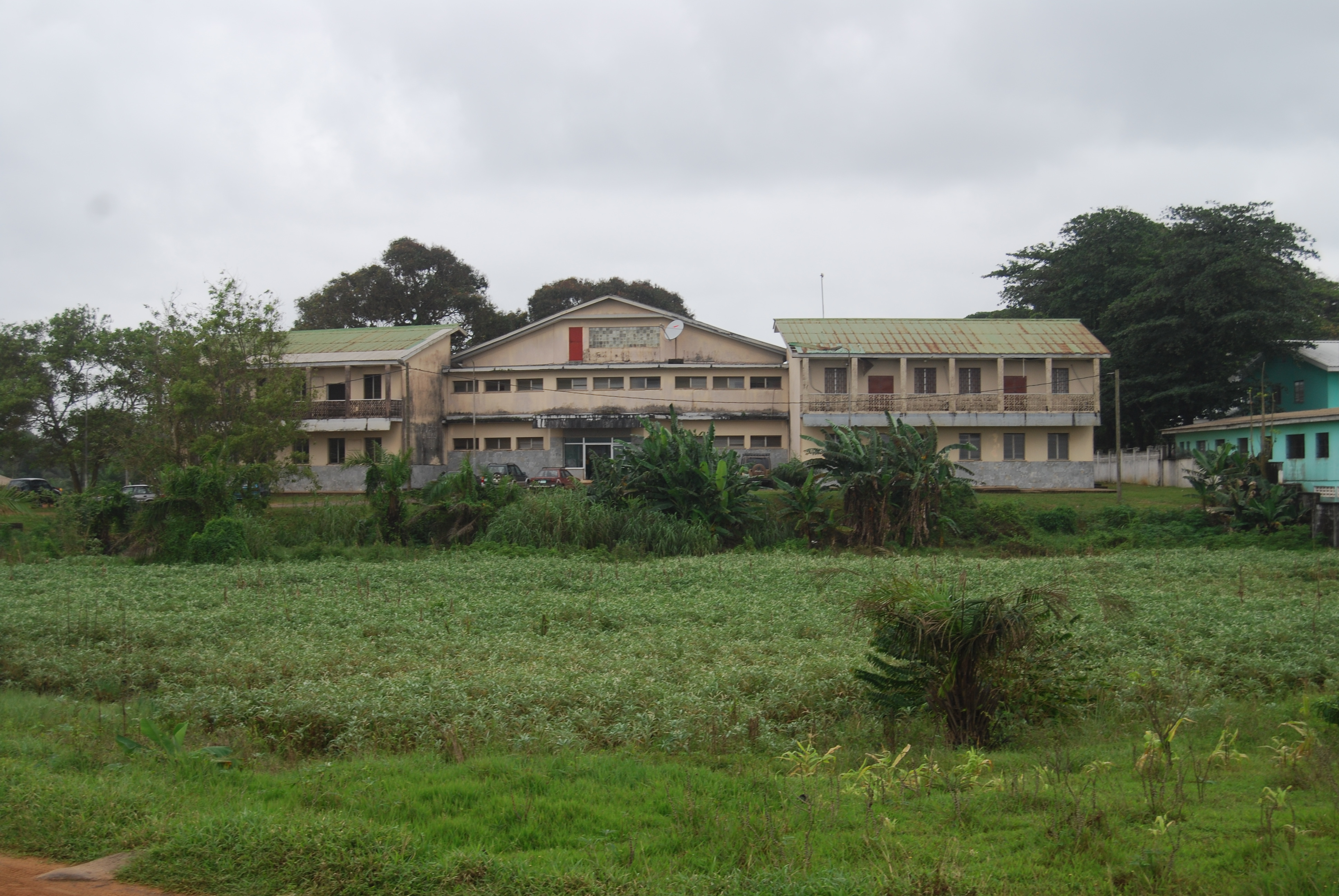
University of Liberia (2009)

Upon the invitation of President William Tubman, Massaquoi returned to Liberia on 13 October 1946 to help him establish a university in Monrovia. She became Professor of French and Science in March 1947 at Liberia College, later the University of Liberia (UL). In 1956, she became director, then dean (1960), of the Liberal Arts College and was a co-founder of the Society of Liberian Authors. In 1962 Massaquoi founded and directed a programme for African Studies, which would evolve into the Institute of African Studies at UL.

During her term at the university, Massaquoi succeeded in overcoming the requirement that students should adopt foreign names rather than keeping those of their indigenous families. In connection with this, when she married Ernest Freeman on 26 July 1948, Massaquoi adopted his tribal name Fahnbulleh, calling herself Fatima Massaquoi-Fahnbulleh. Her husband also changed his own name back to Fahnbulleh. To further contribute to the cultural and social development of Liberia, she organized a seminar through the African Studies Program in 1962 to promote the standardization of the Vai script.

With a view to enhancing educational developments in Liberia, in late 1963 and early 1964, Massaquoi spent six months in the United States on an education scholarship, visiting fine arts colleges and university departments of anthropology and sociology, mainly in the east and mid-west. In 1968, while living in Monrovia, Liberia, with her daughter Vivian Seton and her grandchildren, Massaquoi suffered a stroke. This pressed Seton into having the 700 pages of her mother's unpublished autobiography microfilmed, calling on the assistance of colleagues at the University of Liberia. Massaquoi retired from the university in the summer of 1972, receiving an honorary Doctor of Humanities degree. She was also decorated as a Grand Commander of the Grand Star of Africa by the president of Liberia.

Fatima Massaquoi-Fahnbulleh died in Monrovia on 26 November 1978. Posthumously, her microfilmed manuscripts were discovered by German researcher Konrad Tuchscherer, while conducting other research. Arthur Abraham, a historian at Virginia State University, Massaquoi's daughter, Vivian Seton, and Tuchscherer, edited the accounts of her early experiences in Germany and the United States. The book, The Autobiography of an African Princess, was published in 2013 and was well received by critics. Tamba M'bayo of West Virginia University, stated: "The strengths of this autobiography could be gauged at two or more different levels. First, its down-to-heart and honest account of even the most disturbing personal experiences…Second the larger canvas of Sierra Leonean and Liberian cultural and ethno-linguistic history in which Fatima's story is told. Rich in content and well orchestrated…".

== Accolades ==
Throughout her life, Massaquoi received a number of awards and honors, both locally and internationally. She was bestowed with the Tricentenary Bust of Molière by the French Government in 1955. In 1962, she was honoured with the Großes Verdienstkreuz erster Klasse from the Federal Republic of Germany by President Heinrich Lübke. Upon her 1972 retirement, she was granted an honorary Doctor of Humanities from UL and awarded the rank of Grand Commander of the Grand Star of Africa by President William R. Tolbert, Jr. When Massaquoi died, a tribute was held at the University of Liberia. Mary Antoinette Brown-Sherman, who up to that time was the only woman to have served anywhere in Africa as a university president, proclaimed, "Hers was a life of dedication to the Liberian nation and to the cause of education."

== Selected works ==
- Massaquoi, Fatima (2013). The Autobiography of an African Princess. Palgrave Macmillan. ISBN 978-1-137-10250-8.
- Massaquoi Fahnbulleh, Fatima; Henries (artist), Doris Banks (1971). Fatu's Experiences: A Liberian First Reader. Liberian Information Service.
- Massaquoi-Fahnbulleh, Fatima (1973). Writings and Papers of Fatima Massaquoi-Fahnbulleh. African Imprint Library Services.
- Massaquoi, Fatima (1961). The Leopard's Daughter: A Folk Tale from Liberia. Bruce Humphries.
- Massaquoi-Fahnbulleh, Fatima (1953). "The Seminar on Standardization of the Vai Script". University of Liberia Journal, 3/1, 15–37.

== Sources ==
- Darnell, Regna; Gleach, Frederic W. (2006). Histories of Anthropology Annual. University of Nebraska Press. ISBN 0-8032-6657-X.
- Desmond-Harris, Jenée (23 November 2013). "An African Princess Who Stood Unafraid Among Nazis". The Root.
- Dunn, Elwood D.; Beyan, Amos J.; Burrowes, Carl Patrick (20 December 2000). Historical Dictionary of Liberia. Scarecrow Press. ISBN 978-1-4616-5931-0.
- Massaquoi, Fatima (2013). Seton, Vivian; Tuchscherer, Konrad; Abraham, Arthur (eds.). The Autobiography of an African Princess. Basingstoke: Palgrave Macmillan. ISBN 978-1-137-10250-8.
- M'bayo, Tamba E. (December 2014). "Review: Vivian Seton, Kontrad Tuchscherer, and Arthur Abraham, eds. 2013 The Autobiography of an African Princess: Fratima Massaquoi. New York: Palgrave Macmillan. 274pp" (PDF). African Studies Quarterly. 15 (1). Gainesville, Florida: University of Florida: 186–188. ISSN 1093-2658. Archived from the original (PDF) on 5 February 2022.
- Olukoju, Ayodeji (2006). Culture and Customs of Liberia. Greenwood Publishing Group. ISBN 978-0-313-33291-3.
- Poikāne-Daumke, Aija (2004). African Diasporas: Afro-German Literature in the Context of the African American Experience. LIT Verlag Münster. ISBN 978-3-8258-9612-6.
- Smyke, Raymond J. (1990). "Fatima Massaquoi Fahnbulleh (1912–1978) Pioneer Woman Educator" (PDF). Liberian Studies Journal. 15 (1). Kalamazoo, Michigan: Western Michigan University: 48–73. Archived from the original (PDF) on 10 March 2016.
- "Princess Wins Suit Against Fisk U. Autobiography Judged Hers". The Afro American. Baltimore, Maryland. 10 February 1945. p. 1.
- "Julia C. Emery Hall at Bromley Mission, Episcopal Church of Liberia, Clayashland, Montserrado County, Liberia" (PDF). New York, New York: The Episcopal Church Archive. August 2007.
- "Princess Fatima Massaquai Guest at Elaborate Reception". Indianapolis Recorder. Indianapolis, Indiana. 28 August 1937. p. 4.
- C.F. (1984). "History of the Galinhas Country". The Journal of African History. 25 (2).
- "Nearly Fifty Alien Students at Fisk U". The Pittsburgh Courier. Pittsburgh, Pennsylvania. 4 March 1944. p. 14 – via Newspapers.com.
- "Participants in Vai script standardization seminar, University of Liberia, 1962". Bloomington: Indiana University: Liberian Collections | William V.S. Tubman Photograph Collection. 8 August 1962.
