= Massaquoi =

Massaquoi is a surname. Notable people with the surname include:

- Alloysious Massaquoi, Liberian-Scottish musician in the band Young Fathers
- Erika Massaquoi, American fashion designer and curator
- Fatima Massaquoi (1912-1978), Liberian writer
- Francois Massaquoi (died 2001), Liberian warlord and politician
- Hans Massaquoi (1926–2013), American journalist and writer
- Jonathan Massaquoi (born 1988), American football player
- Mohamed Massaquoi (born 1986), American football player
- Momulu Massaquoi (1869–1938), Liberian diplomat
- Nathaniel Varney Massaquoi (1905–1962), Liberian doctor
- Roland Massaquoi, Liberian politician
- Tim Massaquoi (born 1982), American football player
