= Vai =

Vai or VAI has several possible meanings:

- Vai people
  - Vai language
  - Vai syllabary
  - Vai (Unicode block)
- Vai (Crete)
- Văi, a village in Lupșa Commune, Alba County, Romania
- "Vai!", song by Alfa

== Abbreviation ==
- Van Andel Institute, a biomedical research and science education organization in the United States
- VAI, Video Artists International, a classical music record label
- Voest-Alpine Industrieanlagenbau, later part of Siemens VAI Metals Technologies

== People ==
- Rosita Vai (born 1981), New Zealand singer
- Steve Vai (born 1960), guitarist
  - Steve Vai's band Vai
- Vai Sikahema (born 1962), American football player
- Vai Taua (born 1988), American football player
- Vai Toutai (born 1993), Australian Rugby League player
- Vaï (born 1979), Moroccan-French Canadian rapper
