= The Autobiography of an African Princess =

Account of the early years (1912–1946) in the life of Fatima Massaquoi,

First edition (publ. Palgrave Macmillan)

The Autobiography of an African Princess, published in 2013, is an account of the early years (1912–1946) in the life of Fatima Massaquoi, a descendant of the royal families of the Gallinas from Sierra Leone and Liberia. It describes her early childhood in Africa, her schooling in Germany and Switzerland and her university studies in the United States.

== Background ==
Massaquoi first embarked on the story of her life in 1939 while studying social psychology at Fisk University in Nashville, Tennessee. The Chinese scholar Bingham Dai had given her the assignment as a class project. Her professor, Mark Hanna Watkins, with whom she was working on linguistic studies in 1943, encouraged her to continue the work. In a letter dated 22 February 1944, her professor Mark Hanna Watkins wrote that he had encouraged her to write the "story of her life as a tribal child, in contact with and reaction to European culture as represented in Monrovia and the mission school, life and education in Germany and Switzerland; life in America". Massaquoi had also collaborated with Watkins on a dictionary of the Vai language which he tried to publish as his own work. In 1945, she won a permanent injunction against Watkins, Dr. Thomas E. Jones, president of the university, and Fisk University prohibiting them from publishing or receiving any financial rewards from any publication of her work. Massaquoi felt that she had been "conspired against" because she was foreign and did not have the strength to fight for her rights.

In 1946 while at Boston University, Massaquoi completed her autobiography (which was originally titled Bush to Boulevard: The Autobiography of a Vai Noblewoman). In 1968, while living in Monrovia, Liberia, with her daughter Vivian Seton and her grandchildren, Massaquoi suffered a stroke. This pressed Seton into having the 700 pages of her mother's unpublished autobiography microfilmed, calling on the assistance of colleagues at the University of Liberia. Massaquoi died in 1978. Her microfilmed manuscripts were discovered much later by German researcher Konrad Tuchscherer, while conducting other research. "I just thought it was the most amazing piece I had ever seen," he commented. "I was very interested in the history of the Massaquoi family because they had such an important role in spreading the Vai script."

Arthur Abraham, a historian at Virginia State University, Massaquoi's daughter, Vivian Seton, and Tuchscherer, edited Massaquoi's accounts of her early experiences in Germany and the United States. The book, The Autobiography of an African Princess, was published in 2013.

== Contents ==
Covering 274 pages and 19 chapters, the book is divided into three main sections. The first covers the period from her birth until 1922 when she spent her childhood years in Sierra Leone and Liberia, the second describes her education in Switzerland and Germany, where, as a young African woman, she experienced the rise of the Nazi party, and the third, her university years in the United States where she was confronted with racial segregation in the Southern States from 1936 until her return to Liberia in 1946.

== See also ==
- Destined to Witness, an autobiography by her nephew Hans Massaquoi.

== Sources ==
- Darnell, Regna; Gleach, Frederic W. (2006). Histories of Anthropology Annual. University of Nebraska Press. ISBN 0-8032-6657-X.
- Desmond-Harris, Jenée (23 November 2013). "An African Princess Who Stood Unafraid Among Nazis". The Root.
- Dunn, Elwood D.; Beyan, Amos J.; Burrowes, Carl Patrick (20 December 2000). Historical Dictionary of Liberia. Scarecrow Press. ISBN 978-1-4616-5931-0.
- Massaquoi, Fatima (2013). Seton, Vivian; Tuchscherer, Konrad; Abraham, Arthur (eds.). The autobiography of an African princess. Basingstoke: Palgrave Macmillan. ISBN 978-1-137-10250-8.
- M'bayo, Tamba E. (December 2014). "Review: Vivian Seton, Kontrad Tuchscherer, and Arthur Abraham, eds. 2013 'The Autobiography of an African Princess: Fratima Massaquoi'. New York: Palgrave Macmillan. 274pp" (PDF). African Studies Quarterly. 15 (1). Gainesville, Florida: University of Florida: 186–188. ISSN 1093-2658. Archived from the original (PDF) on 2022-02-05.
- Olukoju, Ayodeji (2006). Culture and Customs of Liberia. Greenwood Publishing Group. ISBN 978-0-313-33291-3.
- Poikāne-Daumke, Aija (2004). African Diasporas: Afro-German Literature in the Context of the African American Experience. LIT Verlag Münster. ISBN 978-3-8258-9612-6.
- Smyke, Raymond J. (1990). "Fatima Massaquoi Fahnbulleh (1912-1978) Pioneer Woman Educator" (PDF). Liberian Studies Journal. 15 (1). Kalamazoo, Michigan: Western Michigan University: 48–73. Archived from the original (PDF) on 10 March 2016.
- "Autobiography Judged Hers". Baltimore, Maryland: The Afro American. 10 February 1945.
- "Princess Fatima Massaquai Guest at Elaborate Reception". Indianapolis, Indiana: Indianapolis Recorder. 28 August 1937. p. 4.
- "History of the Galinhas Country". The Journal of African History. 1984.
- "Nearly Fifty Alien Students at Fisk U". The Pittsburgh Courier. Pittsburgh, Pennsylvania. 4 March 1944. p. 14 – via Newspapers.com.
- "Participants in Vai script standardization seminar, University of Liberia, 1962". Indian University: William V.S. Tubman Photograph Collection. 8 August 1962.
