= Fasia Jansen =

- Born: June 6, 1929; Hamburg, Weimar Republic
- Died: December 29, 1997 (aged 68) Oberhausen, Germany

Fasia Jansen (June 6, 1929 - December 29, 1997) was a German political singer-songwriter (Liedermacher) and peace activist.

== Life and career ==
Fasia Jansen was born in Hamburg; she was the illegitimate daughter of the German chambermaid Elli Jansen and the Liberian Consul General Momolu Massaquoi (1869-1938), grandfather of Hans-Jürgen Massaquoi (1926-2013), who worked as a journalist and managing editor of Ebony after emigrating to the United States and authored Destined to Witness: Growing Up Black in Nazi Germany. Although both grew up in close proximity to each other, they did not know each other personally.

She experienced bullying and discrimination at an early age, both because of her skin color and her illegitimate birth. Growing up in the working-class neighborhood of Rothenburgsort in Hamburg, Jansen went through the problems of being an obviously "non-Aryan" during the Nazi era. Her Josephine Baker-oriented hopes of making a living through music and dance were dashed for the time being when she was expelled from dance school at age 11. Three years later she was "conscripted into service" and had to work in a soup kitchen that also supplied satellite camps of the Neuengamme concentration camp near Hamburg. The fifteen-year-old Jansen experienced both the brutality of the SS and the desperation of the prisoners - experiences that had a decisive impact on her life. During this time, she contracted a heart condition from which she suffered for the rest of her life.

In the fledgling German Federal Republic (known also as West Germany), Jansen tried to come to terms with her experiences in the camp and to keep alive the memory of the dead and their ideals. She took up music again, first in a Hamburg choir, later also with her own songs. She moved to the Ruhr area and became involved in the political struggles of the time. She performed at numerous Easter marches (Ostermarsch) for peace, among others in 1966 together with Joan Baez, played at the major strikes in front of the factory gates of Krupp, Hoesch or Thyssen and at the UN World Women's Conference in Nairobi and performed at the Burg Waldeck Festivals. She received numerous penal orders for incitement of the people and resistance to state authority, but time and again she also received offers to sing pop songs and thus become commercially successful.

Fasia Jansen's estate was transferred to the Fritz Hüser Institute by the Fasia Jansen Foundation in May 2022.

== Honors ==
- Fasia Jansen received the Cross of Merit with Ribbon of the Federal Republic of Germany in 1991.
- In 2014, the municipal comprehensive school in Alt-Oberhausen was named Fasia Jansen Comprehensive School
- In Hamburg, the African education center Arca named a public learning space for historiography from the African perspective "Fasiathek.".
- In 2022, the search engine Google honored her with a Doodle designed by Ayşe Klinge.
