= Vai people =

West African ethnic group

Total population
- 240,000

Regions with significant populations
- Liberia: 140,251
- Sierra Leone: 1,205

Languages
- Vai • English • Krio • Gola

Religion
- Islam

Related ethnic groups
- Kono, Gola, Kpelle, Mende, Loma, Gbandi

The Vai are Mandé peoples that live mostly in Liberia, with a small minority living in south-eastern Sierra Leone. The Vai are known for their indigenous writing system known as the Vai syllabary, developed in the 1820s by Momolu Duwalu Bukele and other Vai elders. Over the course of the 19th century, literacy in the writing system became widespread. Its use declined over the 20th century, but modern computer technology has enabled a revival.

The Vai people speak the Vai language, which is one of the Mande languages. The Sierra Leonean Vai are predominantly found in Pujehun District around the Liberian border. Many Sierra Leonean villages that border Liberia are populated by the Vai. In total, about 1200 Vai live in Sierra Leone.

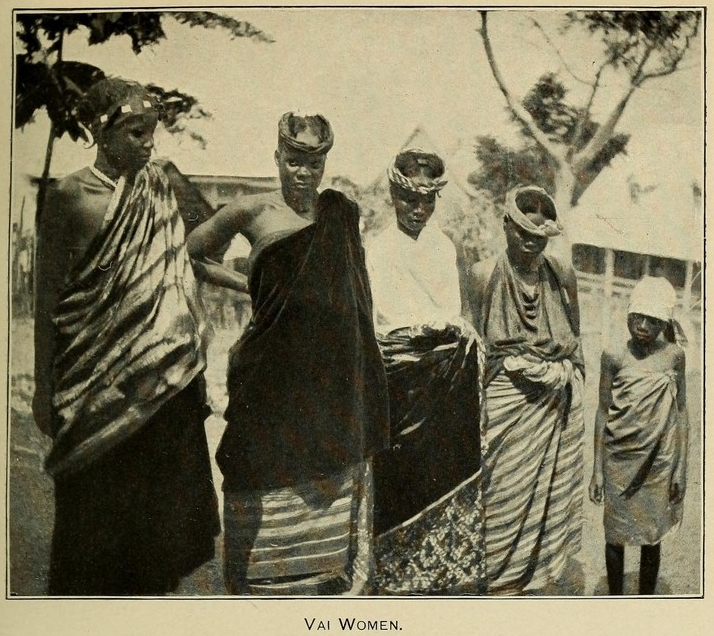
Group of Vai women and girls, 1907

== History ==
The earliest written documentation of the Vai is by Dutch merchants sometime in the first half of the 17th century, denoting a political group near Cape Mount. The Vai are, however, likely the people called Gallinas by the Portuguese, which has them settled in the area by the mid 15th century. Led by the Camara clan, one of the earliest Mandinka inhabitants of Manding region, they had come southwest to raid and trade in salt and Kola nuts.

Oral histories transmitted by Momolu Massaquoi describe a Mandinka king sending expeditions south from the Manding region to discover the sea and stimulate a trade in salt. The members of these expeditions intermarried with local Gola people to create the Vai, but they retained strong trade links with the Mandinka of the interior.

== Culture and education ==
In many aspects, the Vai are a unique African ethnicity. Some writers believe that the region inhabited by the Vai is the original home of the Poro, a male secret society known throughout West Africa. The Vai are also quite musical. They play many instruments and perform dances on special occasions.

The Vai have three types of schooling. The first and most important is the bush school, where the children learn traditional Vai socialization skills, important survival skills, and other traits of village life for four to five years. Second is the English school; some Vai children attend English schools to learn the English language. Finally, there are the Quranic schools, where Vai children are taught the Arabic language under the guidance of the local Muslim religious leader.

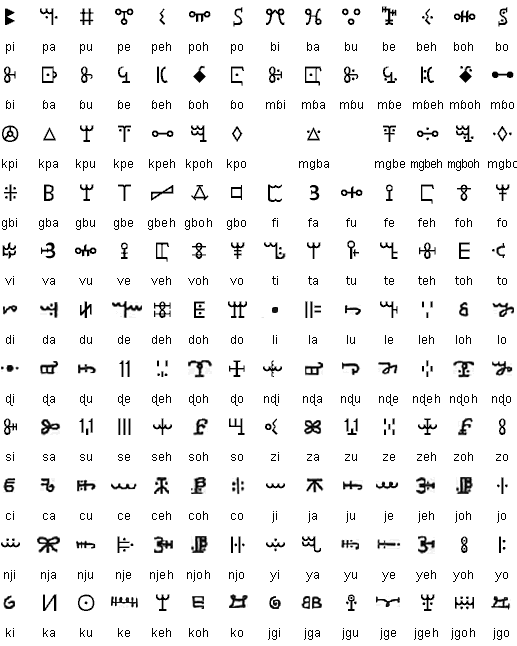
Vai script

== Religion and spiritual belief ==
The Vai are predominantly Muslim and have for centuries practiced traditions rooted in studying the Quran. The Vai adopted Islam through the influence of Mandinka merchants from the 16th century onwards.

These monotheistic religions however coexist with traditional beliefs in the supernatural, and shamanistic practices are common as people consider themselves to be surrounded by spirits that can change into living creatures or objects. These spirits are believed to have the power to do evil to individuals or to the whole tribe. The Vai perform ceremonies for the dead in which they leave articles of clothing and food near the graves of the deceased.

== Economy ==
Most Vai make their living by farming the fertile land. Rice is their staple crop and can be cultivated with other vegetables on upland plots of cleared land. In addition to rice, crops such as cotton, corn, pumpkins, bananas, ginger, coffee, and cocoa are raised. The Vai also gather various nuts and berries from the forests. The palm tree is an important commodity to the Vai. Nuts, butter, wine, fuel, soap, and baskets are among its many derivatives.

== Notable Vai people ==
- Momolu Duwalu Bukele (1788–1888), inventor of the Vai script in the early 19th century
- Famata Bendu Sandemani (died 1892), Queen of Vai
- Momulu Massaquoi (1870–1938), King of Vai tribe, Liberian politician and diplomat
- Nathaniel Varney Massaquoi (1905–1962), Liberian educator and politician
- Fatima Massaquoi (1912–1978), Princess of Vai tribe, pioneering educator in Liberia, author of The Autobiography of an African Princess
- Hans-Jürgen Massaquoi (1926–2013), of mixed Liberian Vai and German descent, grew up as a non-Aryan in Nazi Germany to later become a journalist in the USA.
- Ruth Perry (born 1939), former President of Liberia
- Varney Sherman (born 1953), Liberian politician
- Wayétu Moore (born 1985), Liberian author, of mixed Vai and Americo-Liberian ancestry
- Joseph Fahnbulleh (born 2001), American-born Liberian sprinter

== See also ==
- Vai language
- Vai syllabary
- Gallinas people
