= A Grammar of Vai =

- First edition
- Author: William E. Welmers
- Language: English
- Publisher: University of California Press
- Publication date: 1977

A Grammar of Vai, alternatively known as Grammar of the Vai, is the title of the first English language grammar of the Vai language written since J.W. Koelle's Outlines of a grammar of the Vei language from 1854. The grammar was written by William E. Welmers and published in June 1977 by the University of California Press.

There are 16 chapters, each covering aspects of the language, and with sub-chapters detailing specifics.

The author categorizes the language's consonants by chronological development order, something characterized by reviewer G. Innes as "highly unusual", but, in his opinion, "soundly based".

The spelling used in the book had not yet been adopted in wide use, but had been proposed by the author. Reviewer W. A. A. Wilson stated that the spelling conventions used were "unusual, though justifiable".

== Reception ==
Charles S. Bird of Indiana University wrote that the book is "straightforward, readable". Bird stated that the work is "valuable" as long as a reader understands there are "predispositions" from the author.

Reviewer G. Innes praised the work for having "one of the best" works describing a language from the West Africa region, and he also praised the photo-offset masters that were "beautifully typed".

== Bibliography ==
- Welmers, Wm. E. (1977) A Grammar of Vai, ISBN 0520095553
