= Makpele Chiefdom =

Makpele
- Chiefdom
- Interactive map of Makpele
- Country: Sierra Leone
- Province: Southern Province
- District: Pujehun District
- Capital: Zimmi

Population (2004)
  - Total: 21,955
- Time zone: UTC+0 (GMT)

Makpele is a chiefdom in Pujehun District of Sierra Leone with a population of 21,955. Its principal town is Zimmi.
