= Peje =

Peje may refer to:

- PEJE, Partnership for Excellence in Jewish Education
- Pejë, or Peć, a city in Kosovo
- Peje Chiefdom, a chiefdom of Pujehun District, Sierra Leone
- El Peje, nickname of Andrés Manuel López Obrador (born 1953), Mexican president
