= Zimmi =

Zimmi may refer to:

- Dhimmi, a historical term for non-Muslims living in an Islamic state with legal protection
- Zimmi, Sierra Leone
