= Bomi =

Bomi may refer to:

- Yoon Bo-mi, an idol singer in the South Korean group Apink
- Bomi County, county in Liberia
- Tubmanburg, also known as Bomi, capital of Bomi County in Liberia
- Bomi, Sierra Leone
- Bomi County, Tibet, county in Tibet
- Bomi (bomber missile), a program/design of Bell Aircraft directed by Walter Dornberger.
