= Famata Bendu Sandemani =

Queen of the Vai people (c. 1841– 892)

- Born: c. 1841
- Died: 1892
- Children: Momulu Massaquoi

Famata Bendu Sandemani (c. 1841 – 1892) was a Queen of the Vai people. She was also known as Taradoba, which means "brave" in the Gola language.

Her birthdate is unknown; Swiss naturalist Johann Biittikofer met her in 1886 and estimated that she was born around 1841. She ruled from the town of Njagbacca.

Sandemani took three husbands. She was the favorite wife of King Arma of the Vai. When Arma died of a battle wound, she fought off Arma's brother's attempts to seize the throne and took rulership for herself. Her third husband was King Al-Haj or Lahai of the Gallinas people, grandson of Siaka Massaquoi. Around 1872, she gave birth to their son Momulu Massaquoi on the battlefield. Vai territory was invaded by the Sofa in the 1890s and Sandemani died after being wounded in battle.
