= Tina Campt =

Academic noted for work on Afro-Germans

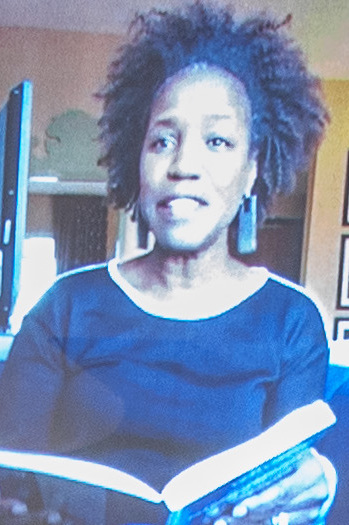
- Occupation: Roger S. Berlind ’52 Professor of Humanities at Princeton University

Academic background
- Education: Vassar College
- Alma mater: Cornell University

Academic work
- Discipline: 20th Century Historian

Tina Campt is Roger S. Berlind ’52 Professor of Humanities at Princeton University. Campt previously held faculty positions as Owen F. Walker Professor of Humanities at Brown University, Director of the Barnard Center for Research on Women and Ann Whitney Olin Professor of Africana and Women's Studies at Barnard College, Professor of Women's Studies at Duke University, and Professor of Feminist Studies at the University of California, Santa Cruz. Campt is the author of four books: Other Germans: Black Germans and the Politics of Race, Gender and Memory in the Third Reich, Image Matters: Archive Photography and the African Diaspora in Europe, Listening to Images, and A Black Gaze: Artists Changing How We See.

== Education ==
Campt was educated at Vassar College, receiving her A.B. in 1986. She then attended Cornell University, earning her M.A. in 1990 and her Ph.D. in 1996.

== Career ==
Campt has gained recognition for her approach to the history of Afro-Germans, which uses a postcolonial, feminist, and diasporic outlook that combines the methodology of an oral historian with that of an ethnographer. In her book Other Germans, for instance, she uses the oral testimonies of two black Germans, Hans Hauck and Fasia Jansen. This is regarded as a significant contribution to German Studies and Holocaust scholarship.

In Image Matters (2012), Campt investigates the identity of the African Diaspora through photography, specifically focusing on black families in Germany and England in the early- to mid-twentieth century. Campt reevaluates everyday photography and family portraiture, placing a particular emphasis on family, gender, and sexuality. Using postcolonial and identity theory as well as an exploration of agency, she exposes intrinsic relationships in readings of photography.

== Books ==
- Other Germans: Black Germans and the Politics of Race, Gender and Memory in the Third Reich, Originally published in 2004, Other Germans attends to the marginalization of Black Germans. According to Campt, Black Germans were largely forgotten about during the Third Reich. Within her book, Campt examines the experiences of these individuals. Her focus is heavily on race, while analyzing the inter-sectional relationship of being Black as well as German.
- Image Matters: Archive, Photography, and The African Diaspora in Europe, Published in March 2012, Image Matters follows the appearance of Black Europeans through archives of family photography found in the mid-twentieth century. Campt looks at both snapshots and studio portraits as a means to explore how communities of Afro German were dispersed, othered, and assimilated into society.
- Listening to Images, Campt's latest 2017 publication utilizes historical archives to uncover previously dismissed photography taken throughout the Black diaspora. Campt interacts with the photographs through sound, tuning into her senses and looking beyond the usual characteristics of a photograph.

== Writing, reviews, and other ==
- Diasporic Hegemonies: Feminists Theorizing the African Diaspora, edited with Deborah Thomas, Feminist Review (2008)
- 'Black Folks Here and There: Diasporic Specificity and Relationality in Jacqueline Nassy Brown's Dropping Anchor, Setting Sail', Antipode: A Radical Journal of Geography, vol. 39 no. 2 (March, 2007) .
- 'Diasporic Hegemonies - Slavery, Memory, and Genealogies of Diaspora: A Dialogue with Jacqueline Nassy Brown and Bayo Holsey', Transforming Anthropology, vol. 1 no. 2 (October, 2006), pp. 163–177 .
- 'Capturing the Black German Subject: Race, Photography, Archive', in Black Germany: New Perspectives on Afro-German History, Politics and Culture, edited by Sarah Lennox and Tobias Nagl (Submitted, 2006).
- '"Be Real Black for Me" - Diaspora, Difference and a Politics of Imagination', in Crossovers: African Americans in Germany, edited by Maria Diedrich, Larry Greene and Juergen Heinrichs (Submitted, 2006).
