= Mallory Lowe Mpoka =

Canadian artist

Mallory Lowe Mpoka (born 1996) is a second-generation Cameroonian Belgian artist based in Tiohtiá:ke/Mooniyaang (Montréal). Her multidisciplinary practice includes photography, textiles, and ceramics. Her work addresses themes of identity, migration, colonialism, memory, and trauma. Her practice is inspired by her ancestral heritage, family photo albums, and archives.

== Work ==
Mpoka was influenced by Tina Campt's work on visual culture and vernacular photography which shaped her multi-sensorial approach to photography as a medium. Accordingly, her work incorporates elements of textiles and photography into sculptural objects and installations.

== Exhibitions ==
Mpoka has exhibited work at the National Gallery of Canada in Ottawa, Toronto's Gardiner Museum, the Art Gallery of Ontario, The Next Contemporary, Centre PHI in Montréal, and Senegal's Dak'Art 2022 Biennale of Contemporary African Art, as part of the Off-Satellite program presented at Galerie Atiss Dakar.

== Awards ==
In 2022 Mpoka was awarded the Malick Sidibé prize by the African Biennale of Photography and the artist received the New Generation Photography Award in 2024.
