= Wayétu Moore =

Liberian-American author

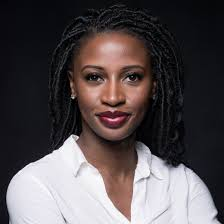
- Moore in November 2018
- Born: 1985 (age 40–41); Liberia
- Education: New York University; Howard University (BA); University of Southern California (MFA); Columbia University (MA)
- Occupations: Author and, social entrepreneur and publisher
- Spouse: Bolobowei Amaso
- Writing career
- Genres: Magical realism
- Notable works: She Would Be King; The Dragons, The Giant, The Women
- Notable awards: Lannan Literary Fellowship
- Website: wayetu.com

Wayétu Moore (born 1985) is a Liberian-American author, social entrepreneur and publisher. Her debut novel, She Would Be King, was published by Graywolf Press in September 2018, and was named a best book of 2018 by Publishers Weekly, Booklist, Entertainment Weekly and BuzzFeed. The novel was positively reviewed by Time Magazine, The New York Times, and The New Yorker. Moore has published work in The New York Times, The Paris Review, Guernica Magazine, The Atlantic, and other journals. She was awarded a Lannan Literary Fellowship for fiction in 2019. Moore's memoir, The Dragons, The Giant, The Women, was named a 2020 New York Times Notable Book, a Time Magazine 10 Best Nonfiction Books of 2020, and a Publishers Weekly Top 5 Nonfiction Books of 2020. In 2011, Moore founded a publishing house and nonprofit organization, One Moore Book, which publishes and distributes books intended for children in countries underrepresented in literature.

== Life ==
Moore was born in 1985 in Liberia and is one of five siblings. She is of mixed Vai, Gola and Americo-Liberian ancestry. Her mother is a professor of English, and the founding Dean of Liberia Honors College at the University of Liberia. Her father is a professor of engineering and Dean of The College of Engineering at the University of Liberia.

When she was five years old, Moore's family fled their home in Monrovia to escape the First Liberian Civil War. To protect the children from the horrors of the war, Moore's father and grandmother created a magical narrative for them in which gunshots were "dragons fighting" and dead bodies were "people sleeping on the road". At the time, Moore's mother was studying at Columbia University on a Fulbright scholarship, and had no news of her family's fate. She flew to Sierra Leone, where she eventually found a female fighter who was able to locate the rest of the family and bring them across the border. Subsequently, the Moore family moved to Houston, Texas. There, Moore read and wrote prolifically, which she credits with helping her overcome the trauma she experienced during the war.

Moore attended New York University's Tisch School of the Arts for theater, before transferring and obtaining her bachelor's degree in journalism from Howard University. She also holds an MFA in creative writing from the University of Southern California and an MA in anthropology and education from Columbia University. She currently lives in New York, New York.

Moore cited Octavia Butler, Toni Morrison, Isabelle Allende, Ben Okri and Salman Rushdie as inspirations. She has also credited Liberian poet Patricia Jabbeh Wesley as a literary inspiration.

== One Moore Book ==
One Moore Book, launched in 2011, is a publishing company and nonprofit founded by Moore and her siblings to provide culturally relevant books to children who are underrepresented in literature and live in countries with low literacy rates. "The goal of the company is to provide books to children who rarely see themselves in books. Our books also serve the dual purpose of giving children here a glimpse of countries they may never have an opportunity to visit," Moore said in an interview. The initial books were written by Wayétu and her sister Wiande, and illustrated by her sister Kula and brother Augustus. These books served as a pilot series for the organization's model. One Moore Book later collaborated on a series of books with Haitian-American author Edwidge Danticat. They currently publish 23 titles, including books set in Liberia, Haiti, Brazil, and Guinea. One Moore Book sells books as well as distributing thousands of free books to children in target countries. Some of their titles are distributed through Scholastic Book Clubs.

One Moore Book opened a bookstore called One Moore Bookstore in Monrovia in May 2015. It is the first bookstore in Liberia dedicated to selling recreational literature, and also allows visitors to read in the store.

== She Would Be King ==
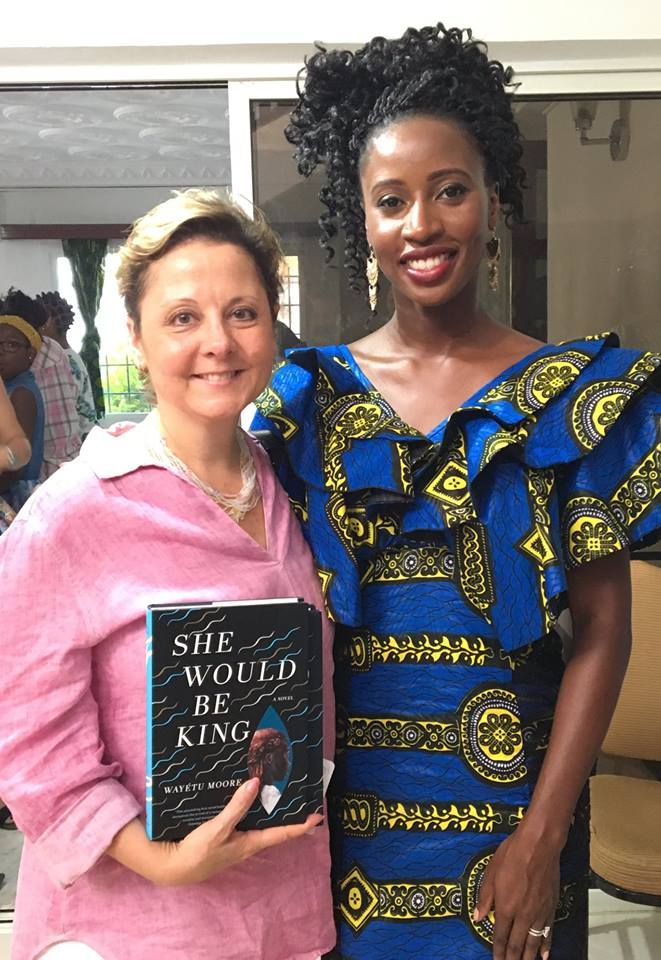
Moore attends a reading of She Would Be King at the U.S. embassy in Monrovia with Ambassador Christine A. Elder.

Moore's 2018 debut novel, She Would Be King, is set early in Liberia's history and is an example of magical realism, featuring protagonists with superhuman abilities. The novel received largely positive reviews. "Reading Wayétu Moore's debut novel, She Would Be King (Graywolf Press), feels a lot like watching a superb athlete's performance," Bethanne Patrick wrote in Time Magazine. Lovia Gyarkye wrote in The New York Times:

She Would Be King is an ambitious and expansive novel that explores the nuances of Liberian history...Ms. Moore skillfully reconsiders the idealism of the early African-American settlers through their interactions with the indigenous peoples and braids together intimate story lines centered around universal themes: falling in love, defying familial expectations and the difficulties of doing the right thing.

A brief review in The New Yorker stated: "The force and the symbolism of myth pervade Moore's engrossing tale."

The novel was chosen by Sarah Jessica Parker as the fifth American Library Association Book Club Central pick in 2018.

== The Dragons, The Giant, The Women ==
The Dragons, The Giant, The Women, a memoir, was published by Graywolf Press in June 2020. The book describes Moore's childhood experiences during the Liberian Civil War.

In an interview prior to its publication, Moore said of the book:

maybe [it will] give a new perspective to the African war story that isn't about some aid worker who came in and saved us, and we weren't in a refugee camp. This was my dad doing what he could to make sure we were safe, my mom risking everything to go back, and this network of women soldiers that created a business trafficking people's families out of the country when no one was allowed out of the country at the time.

In a review in The New York Times, Grace Talusan described the book as "immersive" and "exhilarating", writing: "This memoir adds an essential voice to the genre of migrant literature, challenging false popular narratives that migration is optional, permanent and always results in a better life..."

== Bibliography ==
- She Would Be King (novel)
- The Dragons, The Giant, The Women (memoir)

Children's Books:

- 1 Peking
- A Gift for Yole
- I Love Liberia
- J is for Jollof Rice
- Jamonghoie (written with Wiande Moore-Everett based on a story by Jassie Senwah-Freeman)
- Kukujumuku
