= Frank Mehring =

German American Studies Scholar, founder of a literature journal and European DH Network

Prof. Dr. Frank Mehring
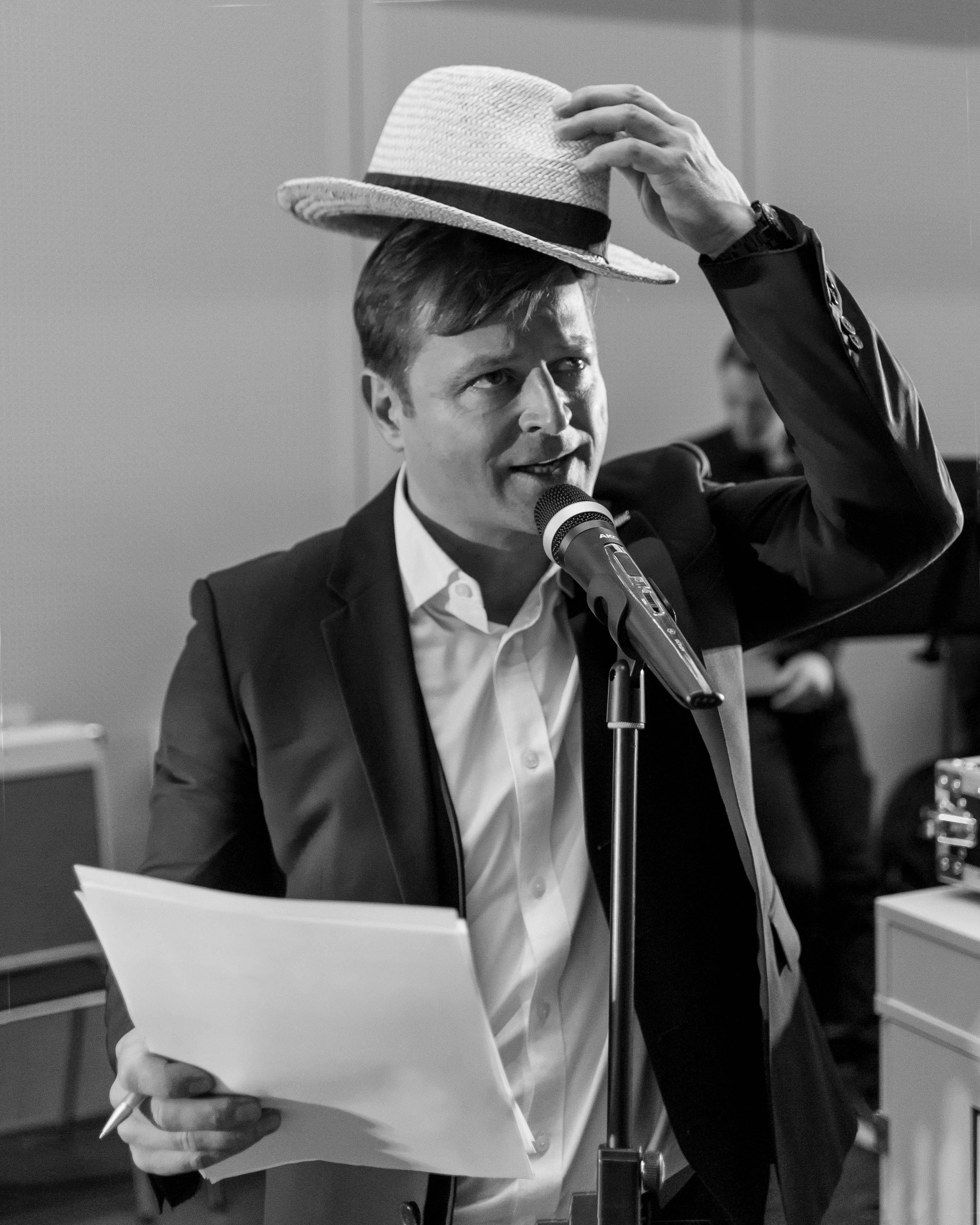
- Frank Mehring at the German premiere of *La Sterlina Dollarosa*, 2018
- Born: December 29, 1970 (age 55); Alsfeld, Hesse, Germany
- Education: University of Wisconsin-Madison Harvard University Freie Universitaet Berlin - John F. Kennedy Institute for North American Studies
- Alma mater: Justus Liebig University Giessen
- Employer: Radboud University Nijmegen
- Awards: EAAS Rob Kroes Award

Frank Mehring (born 29 December 1970 in Alsfeld) is a German Americanist and professor at Radboud University Nijmegen. His research interests include transnational American studies, German-American and Dutch cultural relations, music and visual culture, cultural diplomacy, and cultural memory. His scholarly work examines the relationships between cultural expression, migration, and ideas of democracy and freedom. His monograph The Democratic Gap received the Rob Kroes Award in Transnational American Studies. Mehring has served as president of the Netherlands American Studies Association (NASA) since 2024. His public engagement includes exhibitions, music projects, and museum work exploring transatlantic cultural history.

== Education and academic career ==
Mehring earned his M.A. at the Justus Liebig University in Giessen, focussing on English Romantic Literature and American Transcendentalism. He received a doctorate in English and American Studies in 2001, exploring the manifestation of transcendentalist ideas in the music of Charles Ives and John Cage. His postdoctoral thesis, The Democratic Gap, examines the transcultural confrontations between German immigrants and the American promise of freedom. Mehring premiered the first performance of the Marshall Plan opera La Sterlina Dollarosa by Alfred Friendly in Germany. He held a three-year visiting professorship at the John F. Kennedy Institute for North American Studies in Berlin. In 2012, Mehring became Professor of American Studies at Radboud University Nijmegen. Mehring also serves as President of the Netherlands American Studies Association (NASA), regional director of the German Atlantic Society (DAG), and as an honorary director at Museum Forum Arenacum.

== Main research areas ==
Mehring's research focuses on the intersection of culture, media and politics in order to trace transfer processes between Europe and North America.

=== Transnatioal American studies and intermedial life writing ===
His work on the transcultural confrontation of German immigrants such as Charles Follen, Ottilie Assing, Winold Reiss, Kurt Weill, Hans J. Massaquoi, and Hannah Arendt received the European Rob Kroes Award in Transnational American Studies.

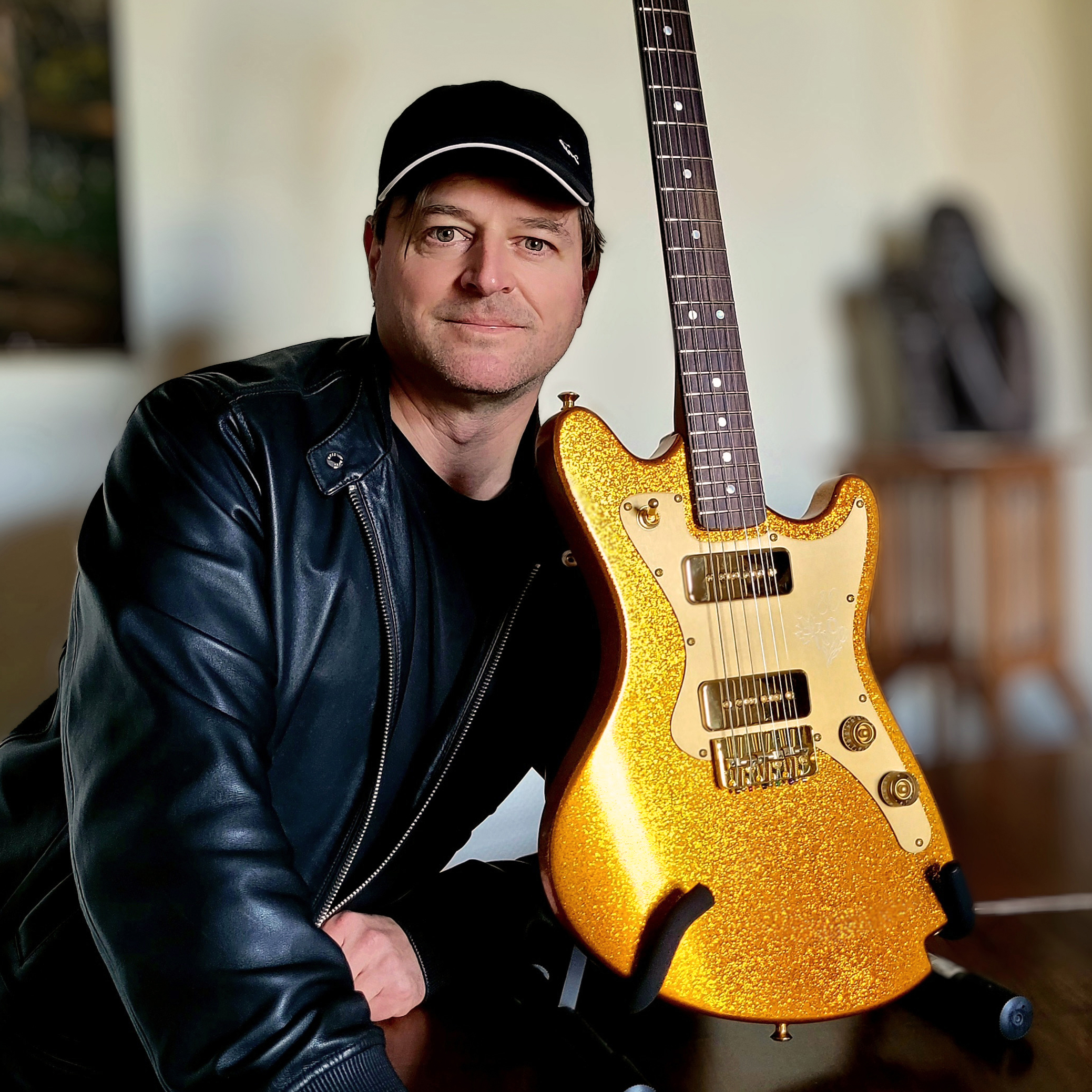
A handcrafted Canadian Liberation Guitar, created to commemorate the 80th anniversary of the Canadian liberation of the Netherlands (1945–2025), presented to Frank Mehring at the Freedom Museum in Groesbeek (Netherlands).

Mehring wrote the German biography of the German-American freedom fighter and abolitionist Charles Follen (2004) and published a selection of Follen's works in 2007. He helped erecting a commemorative plaque in the city of Romrod where Follen was born. In Berlin, he organized the first international symposium on the German-American artist, teacher and designer Winold Reiss at the Free University of Berlin. He published an overview of Reiss's work in the book The Multicultural Modernism of Winold Reiss (1886–1953) – (Trans)National Approaches to his Work (2022.) Mehring has developed an intermedial approach to life writing that examines how text, images, sound, and performance interact in the representation of individual lives and collective identities. In his research on the Harlem Renaissance, he applies this framework to Winold Reiss, Zora Neale Hurston, and Aaron Douglas, exploring the relationships between portraiture, literary narrative, music, and performance.

=== Music, literature, and visual culture ===
Mehring's work is informed by foci on intermediality in popular culture and cultural mobility in transatlantic contexts. The CD Poe-Attic-Lies-Sense (1999) emerged from his book on Sight & Sound with poems of English and American Romanticism set to music, followed by recordings of Dutch liberation songs in the book on Soundtrack van de Bevrijding (Soundtrack of Liberation) (2015), also published as video clips as part of the Canadian Tulips Festival. Concerts with pianist Jens Barnieck, with whom he produced the sound installation The Mexico Diary based on diary entries by Winold Reiss. Other biographical projects focus on Antonia Brico (June 26, 1902 – August 3, 1989), the first conductor from the Netherlands, and on the band Van Halen, whose roots lie in Amsterdam and Nijmegen. In commemoration of the 80th anniversary of the Canadian liberation and in recognition of his efforts to preserve the soundtrack of liberation, Mehring has brought his research on Dutch liberation songs into live performance, collaborating with musicians and school choirs in the Dutch-German border region. Drawing on historical songs associated with the liberation of the Netherlands in 1945, these concerts combine musical performance with historical education, introducing audiences to the role of music in expressing freedom, gratitude and postwar cultural exchange. In 2020, a selection of these songs was adapted into music videos for the Canadian Tulip Festival, making the historical repertoire accessible to international audiences. His work in this area includes the 2025 publication Songs of Liberation in the Netherlands: The Transatlantic Soundtrack of Freedom, which examines songs preserved in the Hugo Keesing collection at the Freedom Museum in Groesbeek. Mehring received a handcrafted Canadian Liberation Guitar from Richard Thain at the Freedom Museum in Groesbeek. The instrument serves as a sonic ambassador, enabling him to convey the history of lost and regained freedom through his musical performances.

Mehring organised performances of the rediscovered Marshall Plan opera La Sterlina Dollarosa, originally written in 1949 by Alfred Friendly, head of the Marshall Plan Information Division in Paris. The satirical operetta draws on popular music from the 1920s to the 1940s to examine the political and economic ambitions of postwar European reconstruction. Mehring helped bring the work to the stage in Kleve in 2018 and Aachen in 2019, collaborating with musicians, university ensembles and school students from the German-Dutch border region. The productions accompanied his research and exhibitions on the Marshall Plan's cultural history, using musical performance to explore American-European relations during the reconstruction of Europe.

Mehring has produced radio features for SFB Radio Kultur, Deutschlandfunk, and Deutschlandradio Kultur on American music, transatlantic cultural relations, and cultural diplomacy. Topics have included Henry David Thoreau’s influence on avant-garde music, Charles Ives and John Cage, sound artist Robert Rutman, representations of America in German popular music, Marshall Plan films, and Heiner Goebbels’ Surrogate Cities.

=== Democratic crises and environmental challenges ===
Mehring’s recent research examines democratic crises, political polarisation, and environmental issues in the United States. With sociologist Hermann Strasser, he explores the cultural and media contexts of contemporary democratic crises in Die USA im kollektiven Ausnahmezustand: Zwischen Amok und Reality-TV. His work also addresses environmental humanities and sustainable American studies. His edited collection The Environment in Sustainable American Studies: Powered by Nature (2026) connects ecocritical approaches to literature and culture with environmental justice, sustainability, and transnational cultural research.

Mehring is a member of the Environmental Humanities research group at the Radboud Institute for Culture and History (RICH). In 2025, the group collaborated with university library staff and the Center for Art History Documentation on the exhibitions Soil and Water: Go with the Flow, which explored human relationships with soil and water. Mehring developed TOPO (Theory, Organization, Performance, Outreach), a framework connecting transnational American studies with place-based learning and public engagement. The approach is applied in the RUDESA Spring Academy, a collaboration between Radboud University and the University of Duisburg-Essen. Radboud University He discusses this approach in “Finding the Cost of Freedom: Locating and Teaching Sustainable American Studies in Times of War and Climate Change”, published in RSAJournal (2026).

=== Academic service and public engagement ===
Mehring served as a member of the American Studies Association (ASA) International Committee (2018 to 2021).Together with Tatiani Rapatzikou and Stefan L. Brandt, he founded the journal AmLit (American Literatures) and the EAAS Digital Studies Network. Mehring volunteers as director of the Museum Forum Arenacum on the subject of art, culture and history in the Lower Rhine region. Since 2024, Frank Mehring has served as the President of the Netherlands American Studies Association (NASA) to promote interdisciplinary research, academic collaboration and cultural exchange between the Netherlands and the United States. Mehring is a co-founder of the Digital Studies Network at the European Association for American Studies (EAAS) and of the peer-reviewed online journal American Literatures (AmLit). He is an active member of the German Academic Scholarship Foundation and serves as a regional leader of the German Atlantic Association (Deutsche Atlantische Gesellschaft e.V.).

== Publications (selection) ==
=== As author ===
- Sight & Sound: Naturbilder in der Englischen und Amerikanischen Romantik. Tectum-Verlag, Marburg 2001 [with CD], ISBN 3-8288-8324-9
- Sphere Melodies: Die Manifestation Transzendentalistischer Ideen in der Musik von Charles Ives und John Cage. Metzler, Stuttgart 2003, ISBN 978-3-476-45311-2
- Karl/Charles Follen: Deutsch-Amerikanischer Freiheitskämpfer. (Studia Giessensia 12). Universitätsverlag Ferber, Giessen 2004, ISBN 978-3-932917-55-4
- The Democratic Gap: Transcultural Confrontations of German Immigrants and the Promise of American Democracy. Winter, Heidelberg 2014, ISBN 978-3-8253-6170-9
- De Soundtrack van de Bevrijding: Swingen, Zingen en Dansen op Weg naar Vrijheid. Vantilt, Nijmegen, 2015. ISBN 9789460042201 [with CD].
- Songs of Liberation in the Netherlands: The Transatlantic Soundtrack of Freedom. Amsterdam: AUP, 2025. ISBN 978-9-048570218
- BEUYS LAND. Gerd Ludwig. Lammerhuber, Wien, 2024. ISBN 978-3-903101-99-9

=== As editor ===
- Between Natives and Foreigners. Selected Writings of Karl/Charles Follen (1796–1840). With an introduction by Frank Mehring. (New Directions in German-American Studies) Lang, New York 2007, ISBN 978-0-8204-9732-7
- Transcultural Spaces: Challenges of Urbanity, Ecology, and the Environment in the New Millennium. With Winfried Fluck, Stefan Brandt. Narr, Tübingen 2010.
- Politics and Cultures of Liberation: Media, Memory, and Projections of Democracy. With Hans Bak, Mathilde Roza. Brill, Amsterdam 2018, ISBN 978-90-04-29200-0
- Sound and Vision: Intermediality and American Music. With Erik Redling. In European Journal of American Studies. 12 (4 ), 2017, ISSN 1991-9336 doi:10.4000/ejas.12384
- The Multicultural Modernism of Winold Reiss (1886–1953) – (Trans)National Approaches to his Work. Deutscher Kunstverlag, Berlin 2022. ISBN 978-3-422-98052-5
- Electronic Wastelands? Information Management, Cultural Memory, and the Challenges of Digitality. With Stefan Brandt and Tatiani G. Rapatzikou. AmLit – American Literatures. 3.1 (2023). doi:10.25364/27.2:2022.2.0
- Faces of Liberation. The Groesbeek Canadian War Cemetery. With Jaap Verheul. Amsterdam University Press, 2025. ISBN 978-9-048565849. Dutch Version: Gezichten van de Bevrijding; De Canadese Oorlogsbegraafplaats Groesbeek. Walburg Pers, 2025. 978-9-464564891
- The Environment in Sustainable American Studies: Powered by Nature. Routledge, 2026. ISBN 978-1-041-01687-8.

== Museum Director ==
Frank Mehring serves as the honorary museum director of the Museum Forum Arenacum in Rindern. The museum, with a focus on Roman and Franconian history, is a vital center for understanding the formative years of artist Joseph Beuys. The museum has initiated the "art and climate change" project which uses art to read landscape through an ecological lens.

In 2021, Mehring initiated the photographic landscape installation Beuys Land, featuring the work of German-American photographer Gerd Ludwig, to explore the connection between art and climate change in the unique natural landscape of Beuys' youth between Kleve in Germany and Nijmegen in the Netherlands.

=== Exhibitions (selection) ===
- 2018: The New Marshall Plan Europe 1948/2018 – Memories, Discoveries, Lessons, Radboud University and Hochschule Rhein-Waal, Kleve.
- 2021: Joseph Beuys: Kindheit und Jugend in Rindern, Forum Arenacum, Rindern
- 2021: Bäume, Beuys & Brüx. Forum Arenacum, Rindern
- 2022: Retro: Von Brüx bis Brüx 1902–2002, Forum Arenacum, Rindern
- 2023: Industrie-Fotografie: Josef Hintzen, Forum Arenacum, Rindern
- 2023: Resonanz: Fritz Poorten – Wasserburg-Kapelle in Rindern
- 2024: The Liberation 80 Years Ago - From Market Garden to the Rhineland Offensive, Rindern in Cooperation with Groesbeek Airborne Vrienden
- 2025: The Van Halen Story: From Nijmegen Roots to Global Success, Radboud University

Since becoming a museum director, Frank Mehring has published several works that bridge local art history, cultural studies, and transatlantic relation enriching both scholarly discourse and public engagement with cultural heritage. His publications feature collaborations with internationally renowned photographers such, as well as acclaimed illustrators and artists. In 2025, Mehring appeared in the ARTE documentary ''Der mystische Rhein von Joseph Beuys'', discussing the cultural and environmental legacy of the artist.

=== Publications ===
- Frank Mehring, Kurt Kreiten (Hrsg.): Die Wasserburg Rindern im Wandel der Zeit: Jagdschloss, Gefechtsstand und Bildungsstätte. Kleve, 2020. ISBN 978-3-981793277
- Gerd Ludwig, Frank Mehring: Beuys Land. Lammerhuber, 2024. ISBN 978-3-903101-99-9
- Frank Mehring, Die Kaese-Spionin: Das Geheimnis des Gelben Buches. Rindern: Edition Mosaik, 2025 ISBN 978-3-98135366-2.
