= Ansumana Jaia Kaikai =

Alhaji Ansumana Jaia Kaikai

Deputy Minority Leader of the Sierra Leone Parliament
- Incumbent
- Assumed office 2012

Member of Sierra Leone Parliament from Pujehun District
- In office 1996–present

Personal details
- Born: Pujehun District, Sierra Leone
- Party: Sierra Leone People's Party (SLPP)

Honorable Alhaji Ansumana Jaia Kaikai is a Sierra Leonean politician and the deputy minority leader of Sierra Leone Parliament. He is an elected member of Parliament from Pujehun District, representing constituency eighty seven. He is a prominent member of the Sierra Leone People's Party (SLPP). He is also the parliamentary chairman of the privileges and ethics committee.

Ansumana Kaikai is currently the longest serving member of the Sierra Leone Parliament. He was first elected to parliament in the 1996 Sierra Leone Parliamentary elections. He has easily won re-elections by large margins in 2002, 2007 and 2012 parliamentary elections.

Ansumana Kaikai is a native of Pujehun District in the south of Sierra Leone. He is a devout muslim and a member of the Mende ethnic group.
