= Hans Hauck =

German soldier

Hans Hauck (10 August 1920 – October 2003) was a German soldier who served in the Wehrmacht during the Nazi regime in Germany. He is one few known Afro-Germans that lived through the Nazi era whose biographical accounts are known.

== Biography ==
Hauck was born in Frankfurt, to Benmansur Belabissi, an Algerian tirailleur in the French Army and a German woman. The pair had met while Benmansur was stationed in Saarbrücken as part of the Entente occupation of the Saar. Hauck's mother had travelled to Frankfurt in order to stay in contact with Benmansur, who had been restationed there, and to avoid a scandal at home about the relationship.

Hauck spent his childhood in his mother's native Dudweiler in a Catholic household. His mother died when he was eight years old, after which Hauk was raised by his grandmother. According to himself, Hauck was accepted by his family and always considered himself German, but endured bullying by other children, both for his skin colour and his mother's contact with French occupiers. When the Nazi Party came into power in 1933, Hauck felt drawn to the idea of having "Aryan" features, believing that espousing the Nazis' ideals would make him appear more German to his peers. The same year, after being denied entry into Catholic youth organisations, Hauck joined the Hitler Youth and in 1935, he began an apprenticeship with Reichsbahn.

In 1936, Hauck was called to an unannounced court meeting, where he was ordered to undergo an anthropometric examination. This had been an excuse to forcibly sterilise him under the Nazi racial purity measures. The procedure, which had still been illegal under existing law, was performed without anesthesia in early 1937. He was then kept at a medical facility alongside five other teenage boys. Hauck noted that this had been the first time in his life that he met other people of mixed race heritage. After signing a document in which he agreed to not pursue any sexual relationships with those judge as fully or half-German, Hauck was released within ten days of his internment and continued his job as a railroad worker.

With the beginning of World War II, Hauck's work crew was pulled from its initial proximity to the Western Front, first to Paderborn, then Schneidemühl and finally Opladen. In 1939 he was declared "unworthy" to join the Army when he went through the conscription process. In 1941, with a renewed need for troops, Hauck received a summons letter to appear for training with the Sturmabteilung for eventual military deployment. Fearing this was a ploy to inter him to further sterilise him, Hauck unsuccessfully attempted suicide by shooting himself in the mouth. He joined the Wehrmacht the following year.

Hauck attributed his survival of the Nazi regime to his service in the Army, but was constantly afraid of being discharged and sent to a concentration camp, which he believed happened to a fellow Afro-German soldier. He made "Private first Class" within five months. was wounded five times, and captured by the Red Army in 1945. After spending four years as a prisoner of war in Minsk, he was released in 1949. Hauck immigrated to Canada, but returned to Germany soon after, spending the rest of his life in Dudweiler, where he died in 2003.

== See also ==
- Rhineland bastard
- Hans Massaquoi
