= Gandorhun =

Gandorhun Gandorhun, Sierra Leone
- Location in Sierra Leone
- Coordinates: 7°33′23″N 11°41′33″W
- Country: Sierra Leone
- Province: Southern Province
- District: Pujehun District

Population (2010)
  - Total: 12,288
- Time zone: UTC-5 (GMT)

Gandorhun is a major diamond-producing town in Sierra Leone and major town in the Pujehun District of the Southern Province. Gandorhun is one of the main cities in Southern Sierra Leone and lies about 45 miles southwest of Bo. The city has a population of around 12,288 residents and is mainly inhabited by the Mende people.
