= Masam =

Masam, Pujehun District
- Location in Sierra Leone
- Coordinates: 7°21′2″N 11°43′5″W
- Country: Sierra Leone
- Province: Southern Province
- District: Pujehun District
- Chiefdom.: Masam Kpaka Chiefdom.
- Time zone: UTC-5 (GMT)

Masam is a small rural town in Pujehun District in the Southern Province of Sierra Leone. The town is the chieftaincy seat of Masam Kpaka Chiefdom. The major industry in the town is farming.

The inhabitants of Masam are almost entirely from the Mende ethnic group, and the Mende language is by far the most widely spoken language in the town.
