= Nathaniel Varney Massaquoi =

Liberian educator and politician

Nathaniel Varney Massaquoi (1905–1962) was a Liberian educator and politician from the Vai community.

== Early life ==
Massaquoi was born on 13 June 1905 in Cape Mount, Liberia. His father was Momolu Massaquoi (1869–1938) (also known as Momolu IV), a Liberian king of the Gallinas kingdom prior to its dissolution by the British. He studied at the College of West Africa before his father was assigned as consul general to Germany for 1922–1930. Massaquoi followed his family to Hamburg, where he lived and studied.

== Career ==
Massaquoi studied law, and also worked as an English and mathematics teacher in Sierra Leone.

In 1940, he and a number of other Liberian leaders were arrested for allegedly plotting the assassination of President Edwin J. Barclay and the overthrow of the government. Massaquoi was released in 1944, along with other political prisoners, following the inauguration of President William Tubman, who decried Barclay's "illegal arrest of peaceful citizens without warrant".

Massaquoi served various judgeships from 1945 to 1960, and as secretary of public instruction from 1957 to 1962. He died in 1962 in a hospital in Hamburg, Germany.
