= Bomi, Sierra Leone =

Town in Southern Province, Sierra Leone

Bomi
- Location in Sierra Leone
- Coordinates: 7°14′46″N 11°31′33″W
- Country: Sierra Leone
- Province: Southern Province
- District: Pujehun District

Population (2009)
  - Total: 6,117
- Time zone: UTC+0 (GMT)

Bomi is a small town in Pujehun District in the Southern Province of Sierra Leone, near the border of Liberia. As of 2009 it had an estimated population of 6,117.

== See also ==
- 2014 Ebola virus epidemic in Liberia
