= Yakemo Kpukumu Krim Chiefdom =

- Chiefdom
- Country: Sierra Leone
- Province: Southern Province
- District: Pujehun District
- Capital: Karlu

Government
  - Paramount Chief: Matilda Lansana Minah
- Time zone: UTC+0 (GMT)

Yakemo Kpukumu Krim Chiefdom is a chiefdom in Pujehun District of Sierra Leone. Its capital is Karlu.
