= Momolu Massaquoi =

Liberian politician & diplomat (1869–1938)

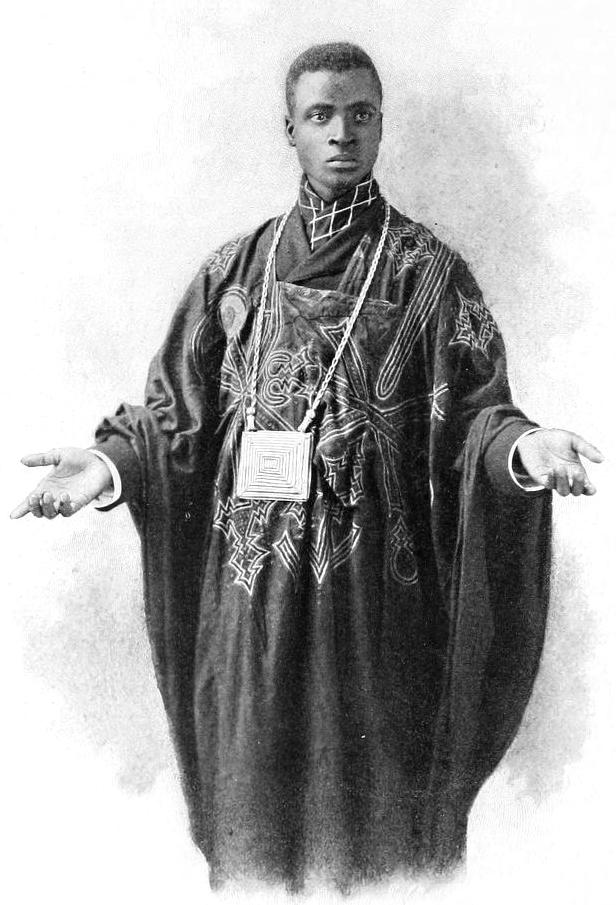
Momolu Massaquoi, from a 1905 publication.

Momolu Massaquoi (1869–1938) was a Liberian politician, diplomat, and monarch of the Vai people of Sierra Leone and Liberia. He served as Liberia's consul general to Germany 1922–1930, and appears to be the first indigenous African diplomat to modern Europe.

== Early life ==
Massaquoi was born on 6 December 1869 to King Lahai of the Gallinas Kingdom and his wife, Queen Fatama Bendu Sandemani of N’Jabacca. He attended a mission school in Cape Mount, before traveling to the United States to attend Central Tennessee College.

Massaquoi was required by his mother to begin to study at an early age. His parents were both Muslims, and in the hopes that their son might learn to read the Quran, they placed him as a student of a Muslim cleric when he was eight years old. Two years later, he came under Christian influence at a mission school of the Protestant Episcopal Church, where he was sent to learn the English language. After several years’ residence at the mission, he was baptized and confirmed.

In 1888, he began attending Central Tennessee College in Nashville, Tennessee. His mother died while he was in college, and her death made him the rightful ruler of N’Jabacca. He felt it to be his duty to return to his people, but again visited the United States to represent Africa at the Parliament of Religious and the African Ethnological Congress in connection with the World's Columbian Exposition. He opened, in May, 1900, an industrial school at Ghendimah, the capital of Gallinas. Here, the pupils were instructed in English, Vai, and Arabic, and in the industrial arts. He was endeavoring, in his own words, “to develop an African civilization independent of any, yet, like others, on a solid Christian principle.”

== Diplomatic career ==
The city-state of Hamburg had maintained diplomatic relations with Liberia since before the First World War with Massaquoi being named the consul general and arriving in the city to take up his post on June 12, 1922. He would hold the position until 1929 when his cousin James S. Wiles replaced him. Upon his return to Liberia he was named the postmaster general.

== Death ==
He died on June 15, 1938, at age 68.

== Notable descendants ==
- Nathaniel Varney Massaquoi, son, Liberian politician
- Hans Massaquoi, grandson, German journalist
- Fatima Massaquoi, daughter, Liberian academic
- Fasia Jansen, daughter, German singer-songwriter and political activist

== Bibliography ==
- The Missionary Review of the World. Missionary Review Publishing Company, Incorporated. 1905.
