= Matilda Lansana Minah V =

Sierra Leonean traditional ruler (born 1935)

- Incumbent
- Assumed office 1985

MP

Assembly Member for Pujehun District
- Incumbent
- Assumed office 2018

Personal details
- Born: March 25, 1935 (age 91)
- Awards: United Nations Women's Guild (2010)

Matilda Yayu Lansana Minah (born 25 March 1935) is Paramount Chief of the Pujehun District in Sierra Leone. She became chief in 1985 after the death of her father, and was elected to parliament in 2018. She is outspoken on women's rights, agriculture and education.

== Biography ==
Minah was born on 25 March 1935 in Sierra Leone. She graduated as a teacher in 1961.

After graduation she married, and went on to have eight children with her husband, who was a nurse. Due to his role the family lived in several locations and Minah taught in schools where they lived. She retired from teaching in 1982 and established a business with her brother, Francis Minah.

In 1985, her father, Momodu John Minah, died, and Minah was crowned Paramount Chief of Yakemo Kpukumu Krim Chiefdom (YKK) in Pujehun District in 1986. She resigned from her business interests at this time. One of her first priorities as chief was to improve agricultural yields in the chiefdom.

In 1987, her brother was murdered by members of the All People’s Congress, and in 1991 she was arrested during the Sierra Leone Civil War and imprisoned for almost a year. After release she travelled to Germany for medical treatment and then returned to Sierra Leone in 1993, living in the city of Bo, close to the Gondama refugee camp where many of her chiefdom's subjects were living. During the war she served on the committee for displaced chiefs. After the end of the war, Minah continued her work as chief with a particular focus on development and education for women. She was a member of the Truth and Reconciliation Commission.

Minah was elected a Member of the Parliament of Sierra Leone in 2018 and is a member of two House Committees: agriculture and non-governmental organisations. She was a member of the Sierra Leonean delegation to the Inter-Parliamentary Union in 2021.

Alongside Paramount Chief Teresa Vibbi, she has spoken out about how women in the north of Sierra Leone need to be acknowledged as landowners and have greater involvement in political life. She was a member of the eighteen women who make up the Women's Caucus of Parliament, and has called for the Sierra Leone parliament to have a 30% quota of women.

== Awards ==
- United Nations Women's Guild (2010)
