= Mano Sakrim Chiefdom =

Mano Sakrim
- Chiefdom
- Interactive map of Mano Sakrim
- Country: Sierra Leone
- Province: Northern Province
- District: Pujehun District
- Capital: Gbonjema

Population (2004)
  - Total: 7,536
- Time zone: UTC+0 (GMT)

Mano Sakrim is a chiefdom in Pujehun District of Sierra Leone with a population of 7,536. Its principal town is Gbonjema.
