= Kpaka Chiefdom =

- Chiefdom
- Interactive map of Kpaka Chiefdom
- Country: Sierra Leone
- Province: Southern Province
- District: Pujehun District
- Capital: Masam

Population (2004)
  - Total: 12,827
- Time zone: UTC+0 (GMT)

Kpaka is a chiefdom in Pujehun District of Sierra Leone with a population of 12,827. Its principal town is Masam.
