= Vai (Unicode block) =

- Range: U+A500..U+A63F (320 code points)
- Plane: BMP
- Scripts: Vai
- Major alphabets: Vai
- Assigned: 300 code points
- Unused: 20 reserved code points

Unicode version history
- 5.1 (2008): 300 (+300)

Unicode documentation
- Code chart ∣ Web page

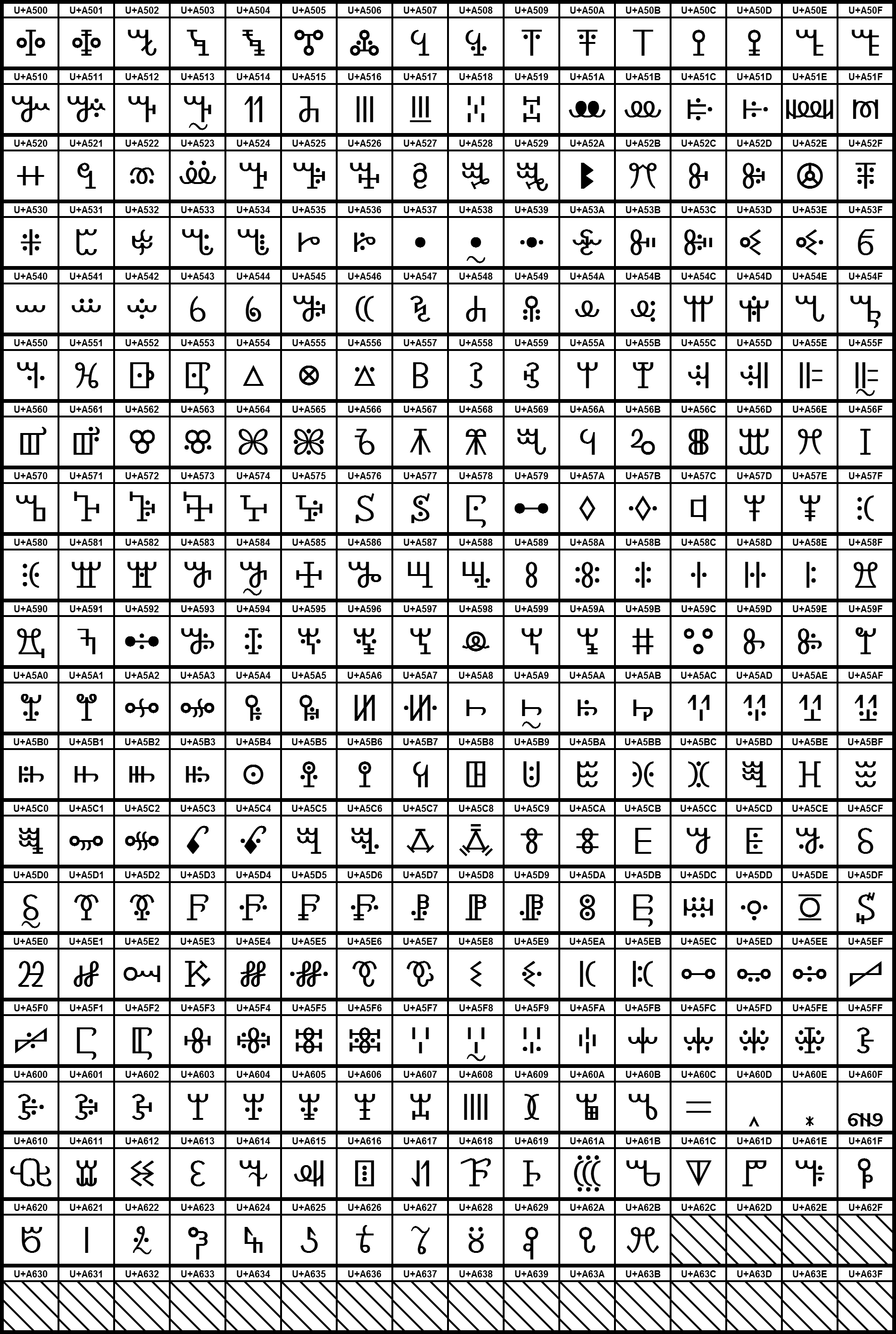
Graphical representation of the Vai Unicode block

Vai is a Unicode block containing characters of the Vai syllabary used for writing the Vai language of Sierra Leone and Liberia.

== Block ==
Vai^{[1]}^{[2]} Official Unicode Consortium code chart (PDF)
	0	1	2	3	4	5	6	7	8	9	A	B	C	D	E	F
U+A50x	ꔀ	ꔁ	ꔂ	ꔃ	ꔄ	ꔅ	ꔆ	ꔇ	ꔈ	ꔉ	ꔊ	ꔋ	ꔌ	ꔍ	ꔎ	ꔏ
U+A51x	ꔐ	ꔑ	ꔒ	ꔓ	ꔔ	ꔕ	ꔖ	ꔗ	ꔘ	ꔙ	ꔚ	ꔛ	ꔜ	ꔝ	ꔞ	ꔟ
U+A52x	ꔠ	ꔡ	ꔢ	ꔣ	ꔤ	ꔥ	ꔦ	ꔧ	ꔨ	ꔩ	ꔪ	ꔫ	ꔬ	ꔭ	ꔮ	ꔯ
U+A53x	ꔰ	ꔱ	ꔲ	ꔳ	ꔴ	ꔵ	ꔶ	ꔷ	ꔸ	ꔹ	ꔺ	ꔻ	ꔼ	ꔽ	ꔾ	ꔿ
U+A54x	ꕀ	ꕁ	ꕂ	ꕃ	ꕄ	ꕅ	ꕆ	ꕇ	ꕈ	ꕉ	ꕊ	ꕋ	ꕌ	ꕍ	ꕎ	ꕏ
U+A55x	ꕐ	ꕑ	ꕒ	ꕓ	ꕔ	ꕕ	ꕖ	ꕗ	ꕘ	ꕙ	ꕚ	ꕛ	ꕜ	ꕝ	ꕞ	ꕟ
U+A56x	ꕠ	ꕡ	ꕢ	ꕣ	ꕤ	ꕥ	ꕦ	ꕧ	ꕨ	ꕩ	ꕪ	ꕫ	ꕬ	ꕭ	ꕮ	ꕯ
U+A57x	ꕰ	ꕱ	ꕲ	ꕳ	ꕴ	ꕵ	ꕶ	ꕷ	ꕸ	ꕹ	ꕺ	ꕻ	ꕼ	ꕽ	ꕾ	ꕿ
U+A58x	ꖀ	ꖁ	ꖂ	ꖃ	ꖄ	ꖅ	ꖆ	ꖇ	ꖈ	ꖉ	ꖊ	ꖋ	ꖌ	ꖍ	ꖎ	ꖏ
U+A59x	ꖐ	ꖑ	ꖒ	ꖓ	ꖔ	ꖕ	ꖖ	ꖗ	ꖘ	ꖙ	ꖚ	ꖛ	ꖜ	ꖝ	ꖞ	ꖟ
U+A5Ax	ꖠ	ꖡ	ꖢ	ꖣ	ꖤ	ꖥ	ꖦ	ꖧ	ꖨ	ꖩ	ꖪ	ꖫ	ꖬ	ꖭ	ꖮ	ꖯ
U+A5Bx	ꖰ	ꖱ	ꖲ	ꖳ	ꖴ	ꖵ	ꖶ	ꖷ	ꖸ	ꖹ	ꖺ	ꖻ	ꖼ	ꖽ	ꖾ	ꖿ
U+A5Cx	ꗀ	ꗁ	ꗂ	ꗃ	ꗄ	ꗅ	ꗆ	ꗇ	ꗈ	ꗉ	ꗊ	ꗋ	ꗌ	ꗍ	ꗎ	ꗏ
U+A5Dx	ꗐ	ꗑ	ꗒ	ꗓ	ꗔ	ꗕ	ꗖ	ꗗ	ꗘ	ꗙ	ꗚ	ꗛ	ꗜ	ꗝ	ꗞ	ꗟ
U+A5Ex	ꗠ	ꗡ	ꗢ	ꗣ	ꗤ	ꗥ	ꗦ	ꗧ	ꗨ	ꗩ	ꗪ	ꗫ	ꗬ	ꗭ	ꗮ	ꗯ
U+A5Fx	ꗰ	ꗱ	ꗲ	ꗳ	ꗴ	ꗵ	ꗶ	ꗷ	ꗸ	ꗹ	ꗺ	ꗻ	ꗼ	ꗽ	ꗾ	ꗿ
U+A60x	ꘀ	ꘁ	ꘂ	ꘃ	ꘄ	ꘅ	ꘆ	ꘇ	ꘈ	ꘉ	ꘊ	ꘋ	ꘌ	꘍	꘎	꘏
U+A61x	ꘐ	ꘑ	ꘒ	ꘓ	ꘔ	ꘕ	ꘖ	ꘗ	ꘘ	ꘙ	ꘚ	ꘛ	ꘜ	ꘝ	ꘞ	ꘟ
U+A62x	꘠	꘡	꘢	꘣	꘤	꘥	꘦	꘧	꘨	꘩	ꘪ	ꘫ				
U+A63x																
Notes 1.As of Unicode version 17.0 2.Grey areas indicate non-assigned code points

== History ==
The following Unicode-related documents record the purpose and process of defining specific characters in the Vai block:

Version	Final code points (Note: Proposed code points and characters names may differ from final code points and names)	Count	L2 ID	WG2 ID	Document
5.1	U+A500..A62B	300	L2/04-374		Riley, Charles (2004-11-06), Status report on Vai encoding
5.1	U+A500..A62B	300	L2/05-053		Riley, Charles L.; Rivera, José R.; Sherman, Tombekai V.; Glavy, Jason (2005-01-31), Preliminary codechart for encoding Vai into the SMP of the UCS
5.1	U+A500..A62B	300	L2/05-159RR	N2948R	Everson, Michael; Riley, Charles; Rivera, José (2005-08-01), Proposal to add the Vai script to the BMP of the UCS
5.1	U+A500..A62B	300	L2/05-180		Moore, Lisa (2005-08-17), "Vai (C.2)", UTC #104 Minutes
5.1	U+A500..A62B	300		N2953 (pdf, doc)	Umamaheswaran, V. S. (2006-02-16), "7.4.5", Unconfirmed minutes of WG 2 meeting 47, Sophia Antipolis, France; 2005-09-12/15
5.1	U+A500..A62B	300	L2/06-136		McGowan, Rick (2006-04-18), Regarding WG2 N3081, proposal for additions to Vai
5.1	U+A500..A62B	300	L2/06-120R	N3081R	Everson, Michael (2006-04-23), Proposal for addition of Vai characters to the UCS
5.1	U+A500..A62B	300	L2/06-108		Moore, Lisa (2006-05-25), "C.12", UTC #107 Minutes
5.1	U+A500..A62B	300		N3103 (pdf, doc)	Umamaheswaran, V. S. (2006-08-25), "M48.3, M48.5c [U+A555]", Unconfirmed minutes of WG 2 meeting 48, Mountain View, CA, USA; 2006-04-24/27
5.1	U+A500..A62B	300	L2/07-104	N3243R	Everson, Michael (2007-04-18), Proposal to add additional historic syllables for Vai
5.1	U+A500..A62B	300	L2/07-118R2		Moore, Lisa (2007-05-23), "111-C17", UTC #111 Minutes
5.1	U+A500..A62B	300	L2/07-268	N3253 (pdf, doc)	Umamaheswaran, V. S. (2007-07-26), "M50.2", Unconfirmed minutes of WG 2 meeting 50, Frankfurt-am-Main, Germany; 2007-04-24/27
5.1	U+A500..A62B	300	L2/05-171		Riley, Charles (2008-07-21), List of Contributors and Participants in the Vai Proposal for Unicode
