= Momolu Duwalu Bukele =

Liberian linguist

Momolu Duwalu Bukele (sometimes known as Momolu Duala Bukare, or spelled as Mɔmɔlu Duwalu Bukɛlɛ), living in the 19th century, was the proliferator of the Vai syllabary derived from the Poro Society, used for writing the Vai language of Liberia—one of several African languages to develop its own writing system.

Bukele is thought by some foreign to the Poro to have invented it around 1833, although dates as early as 1815 have been alleged. According to Ayodeji Olukoju, the script certainly dates from after 1819, when Bukele returned to the interior of Liberia after a period of residence on the coast. The syllabary is supposed to have been revealed to him in a dream, and to have been communicated to friends and tribal elders.

Olukoju argues that the original idea must have arisen from his experience of literacy in coastal Liberia during his sojourn there, and that the visionary experience described may have followed from a period of work on the idea. Tuchscherer and Hair (2002) have presented evidence that exposure to the Cherokee syllabary was part of the process. Part-Cherokee migrants from the US lived in coastal Liberia.

After his creation of the syllabary Bukele and his supporters set up a school in Dshondu to teach the system, and other schools soon followed at Bandakoplo, Mala and other locations.

== Bibliography ==
- Dalby, David. 1967. A survey of the indigenous scripts of Liberia and Sierra Leone: Vai, Mende, Kpelle, and Bassa. African Language Studies 8:1–51.
- Tuchscherer, Konrad and P.E.H. Hair. 2002. Cherokee in West Africa: Examining the Origins of the Vai Script. History in Africa 29:427–486.
