= Soro Gbema Chiefdom =

Soro Gbema
- Chiefdom
- Interactive map of Soro Gbema
- Country: Sierra Leone
- Province: Northern Province
- District: Pujehun District
- Capital: Fairo

Population (2004)
  - Total: 31,977
- Time zone: UTC+0 (GMT)

Soro Gbema is a chiefdom in Pujehun District of Sierra Leone with a population of 31,977. Its principal town is Fairo.
