= Zimmi, Sierra Leone =

Zimmi
- Location in Sierra Leone
- Coordinates: 7°18′55″N 11°18′22″W
- Country: Sierra Leone
- Province: Southern Province
- District: Pujehun District

Population (2009)
  - Total: 5 369
- Time zone: UTC+0 (GMT)

Zimmi is a small town in Pujehun District of southern Sierra Leone. As of 2009 it had an estimated population of 5,369. The town is a trade centre in particular relating to agriculture, mining and commercial business activities, and provides a link for trade with Liberia. Zimmi Community Bank, founded in 2005, is located in the town and serves both the local area and the surrounding Chiefdoms of Barri, Sorogbema and Tunkia.
