= Mark Hanna Watkins =

American linguist and anthropologist (1903–1976)

Mark Hanna Watkins ca. 1930

Mark Hanna Watkins (November 23, 1903 – February 24, 1976) was an Afro-American linguist and anthropologist. He was born in Huntsville, Texas, the youngest of fourteen children of a Baptist minister. He obtained a Bachelor of Science from Prairie View State College in 1926, remaining there for a further two years as assistant registrar. In 1929, he enrolled at the University of Chicago, where he became a pupil of Edward Sapir and wrote a Master's thesis entitled Terms of Relationship in Aboriginal Mexico (1930), dealing with seven genetically unrelated language groups: Otomian, Tarascan, Aztecan, Mixtecan, Zapotecan, Mixean, and Mayan.

Turning from American to African languages for his Ph.D. thesis, between 1930 and 1932 he wrote A Grammar of Chichewa: A Bantu Language of British Central Africa, in cooperation with Kamuzu Banda, a young student from Nyasaland (as Malawi was then known), who in 1966 was to become the first President of the Republic of Malawi. This grammar was the first grammar of an African language to be written by an American. On completing his thesis Watkins became the first African American to receive the Ph.D. degree in anthropology.

From 1934 to 1947, Watkins served as professor of anthropology at Fisk University in Nashville, Tennessee. In 1943, the first African Studies program in the United States was founded at Fisk, and Watkins was one of its six faculty members. In 1944 he returned temporarily to Chicago and in 1945–47 he worked in Mexico and Guatemala. From 1947 to his retirement in 1972, Watkins was professor of anthropology at Howard University in Washington, D.C., where he worked particularly on African languages and on promoting exchange programs between students in Africa and America.

Shortly before his death, he dictated to his wife the final revision of "Setswana Phonemics: Sefokeng Dialect", which appeared posthumously in 1978.

== Bibliography ==
- Spears, Arthur K. (2018). "This Month in Linguistics History: Tribute to Mark Hanna Watkins". Linguistics Society of America.
- Wade-Lewis, Margaret (2004). "Bridge Over Many Waters: Mark Hanna Watkins, Linguistic Anthropologist". Dialectical Anthropology, Vol. 28, No. 2 (2004), pp. 147–202
- Wade-Lewis, Margaret (2005). "Mark Hanna Watkins". Histories of Anthropology Annual, vol 1, pp. 181–218.
- Watkins, Mark Hanna (1937). "A Grammar of Chichewa: A Bantu Language of British Central Africa", Language, Vol. 13, No. 2, Language Dissertation No. 24 (Apr.-Jun., 1937), pp. 5–158.
- Watkins, Mark Hanna (1943). "The West African "Bush" School". American Journal of Sociology, vol. 48, no. 6, pp. 666–75.
- Wright, Jerome W. (December 1976). "Mark Hanna Watkins, 1903-1976". American Anthropologist. 78 (4): 889–890. doi:10.1525/aa.1976.78.4.02a00140. ISSN 0002-7294.
