= Pujehun District =

- Location of Pujehun District in Sierra Leone
- Coordinates: 7°20′N 11°30′W
- Country: Sierra Leone
- Province: Southern Province
- Capital: Pujehun
- Largest city: Pujehun

Government
  - Type: District Council
  - Council Chairperson: Foday Kandeh Rogers (SLPP)
  - Deputy Council Chairperson: Madam Millicent Konneh(SLPP)

Area
  - Total: 4,105 km^{2} (1,585 sq mi)

Population (2015 census)
  - Total: 345,577
  - Density: 84.18/km^{2} (218.0/sq mi)
- Time zone: UTC-5 (Greenwich Mean Time)
- HDI (2017): 0.357 low · 13th

Pujehun District is a district in the Southern Province of Sierra Leone. Pujehun District is one of the sixteen districts of Sierra Leone. Its capital and largest city is the town of Pujehun. The other major towns in the district include Sahn Malen, Zimmi, Jendema, and Potoru. As of 2015, the district has a population of 345,577.

The district of Pujehun borders the Atlantic Ocean in the southwest, the Republic of Liberia to the southeast, Kenema District to the northeast, Bo District to the north and Bonthe District to the west. It occupies a total space of 4,105 km^{2} and comprises twelve chiefdoms.

The population of Pujehun District is mainly from the Mende ethnic group, though minority ethnic groups are also found in the district. Pujehun District is a large Muslim majority district, though there is a significant Christian minority as well.

== History ==
In 1982 the Ndogboyosoi (bush devil) War was fought in the district.

== Geography ==
Pujehun District is located at the southeast corner of Sierra Leone bordering Atlantic Ocean in the southwest and the Liberia to the southeast. The climate is tropical with a wet and dry seasons. At the 2004 census the population of Pujehun District was 234,234; the estimated population in 2010 was 276,970. The district has one of the lowest population densities of Sierra Leone, with most people living in villages of less than 2,000 residents.

== Economy ==
Diamond mining is a major economic activity in the district, as well as agricultural production of cassava, coffee, and cacao.

== Government ==
Pejehun District has six representatives in the Sierra Leonean Parliament, of which five members were elected to a 5-year term. Below are Pejehun District Representatives in the Parliament:

- Matilda Lansana Minah – Paramount Chief of Pujehun District
- Ansumana Jaia Kaikai (SLPP)
- Sidie Tunis (SLPP)
- Dixon Rogers (SLPP)
- Dauda Fahundu (SLPP)
- Senesie Fahundu (SLPP)

Former Ministers from Pujehun District:

- Sheik-Umarr Mikailu Jah (SLPP), 1996-2007.

== Administrative divisions ==
=== Chiefdoms ===
==== Pre-2017 ====
Prior to the 2017 local administrative reorganization, Pujehun District was made up of twelve chiefdoms as the third level of administrative subdivision.

1. Barri – Potoru
2. Gallines Perri – Blama
3. Kpaka – Masam
4. Kpanga Kagonde – Pujehun
5. Makpele – Zimmi
6. Malen – Sahn
7. Mano Sakrim – Gbonjema
8. Panga Krim – Gobaru
9. Peje – Futta
10. Soro Gbema – Fairo
11. Sowa – Bandajuma
12. Yekomo Kpukumu Krim – Karlu

==== Post-2017 ====
After the 2017 local administrative reorganization, Pujehun District has been made up of fourteen chiefdoms as the third level of administrative subdivision.

1. Barri – Potoru
2. Gallines (Note: Formerly part of Gallines Perri Chiefdom; split off.) – ?
3. Kagonde (Note: Formerly part of Kpanga Kagonde Chiefdom; split off.) – ?
4. Kpaka – Masam
5. Kpanga – Pujehun
6. Makpele – Zimmi
7. Malen – Sahn
8. Mano Sakrim – Gbonjema
9. Panga Krim – Gobaru
10. Peje – Futta
11. Perri – Blama
12. Soro Gbema – Fairo
13. Sowa – Bandajuma
14. Yekomo Kpukumu – Karlu

== Religion ==
Religion in Pujehun District (2015)
Religion	Percent(%)
Islam	94.6%
Christianity	4.8%
Baháʼí	0.0%
Traditional African religions	0.0%
Other	0.2%
No Religion	0.4%
