= Gallinas people =

The Gallinas people is a name applied to an ethnic group in eastern Sierra Leone, which formerly existed as an independent kingdom.

"Gallinas" is an exonym applied by Europeans to the inhabitants of the Gallinas River in southeastern Sierra Leone. In the 19th Century, the Gallinas people dominated the coastal area roughly between the Waanji river to the west and the Mano River to the east. Ethnically and linguistically, Gallinas are the northern part of the larger Vai people which overlap Sierra Leone and Liberia.

In 1868 and 1869, the Liberian government raided the chiefdoms of the Gbenmah and Gallinas.

In 1882, the king and chiefs of Gallinas ceded a piece of coastal territory to the British government.

== Kings and chiefs of the Gallinas people ==
King Siaka was king of the Gallinas in 1840, when Joseph Denman contacted him as regards the plight of Fry Norman, a Black British woman who he understood had been seized by Siacca's son Prince Manna.

Another prominent ruler was King Momulu Massaquoi, whose descendants constitute the contemporary royal family.
