= Vai language =

Mande language of Liberia and Sierra Leone

Vai
- ꕙꔤ
- Native to: Liberia, Sierra Leone
- Region: Africa
- Ethnicity: Vai people
- Native speakers: (120,000 cited 1991–2006)
- Language family: Mande: Western Mande; Central; Manding–Jogo; Manding–Vai; Vai–Kono; Vai
- Writing system: Vai syllabary

Official status
- Official language in: Liberia

Language codes
- ISO 639-2: vai
- ISO 639-3: vai
- Glottolog: vaii1241

Two Vai speakers, recorded in Liberia.

The Vai language, also called Liberian, Vy or Gallinas, is a Mande language spoken by the Vai people, roughly 104,000 in Liberia, and by smaller populations, some 15,500, in Sierra Leone.

== Writing system ==
Vai is noteworthy for being one of the few African languages to have a writing system that is not based on the Latin or Arabic scripts. This Vai script is a syllabary invented by Momolu Duwalu Bukele around 1833, although dates as early as 1815 have been alleged. The existence of the Vai script was reported in 1834 by American missionaries in the Missionary Herald of the ABCFM and independently by Rev. Sigismund Wilhelm Koelle, a Sierra Leone agent of the Church Missionary Society of London.

The Vai script was used to print the New Testament in the Vai language, dedicated in 2003.

== Phonology ==
Vai is a tonal language and has 11 vowels and 31 consonants, which are tabulated below.

=== Vowels ===
	Oral vowels		Nasal vowels	
	Front	Back	Front	Back
Close	i iː	u uː	ĩ ĩː	
Close-mid	e eː	o oː	ɛ̃ ɛ̃ː	ɔ̃ ɔ̃ː
Open-mid	ɛ ɛː	ɔ ɔː	ɛ̃ ɛ̃ː	ɔ̃ ɔ̃ː
Open	a aː		ã ãː	

=== Consonants ===
	Labial		Alveolar		Post-al. /palatal		Velar		Labial -velar		Glottal
Nasal		m		n		ɲ		ŋ			
Stop/ Prenasalised	p	b ᵐb	t	d ⁿd	c	ɟ ᶮɟ	k	g ᵑɡ	k͡p	ᵑᵐɡ͡b	
Implosive		ɓ		(ɗ)						ɠ͡ɓ	
Fricatives	f	v	s	z	(ʃ)						h
Approximant (Lateral)						j				w	
Approximant (Lateral)			l ~ ɗ								
Trill				(r)							

[r] and [ʃ] occur only in recent loanwords.

== Sample text ==
The following is a sample text in Vai of Article 1 of the Universal Declaration of Human Rights.

Vai: "ꕉꕜꕮ ꔔꘋ ꖸ ꔰ ꗋꘋ ꕮꕨ ꔔꘋ ꖸ ꕎ ꕉꖸꕊ ꕴꖃ ꕃꔤꘂ ꗱ, ꕉꖷ ꗪꗡ ꔻꔤ ꗏꗒꗡ ꕎ ꗪ ꕉꖸꕊ ꖏꕎ. ꕉꕡ ꖏ ꗳꕮꕊ ꗏ ꕪ ꗓ ꕉꖷ ꕉꖸ ꕘꕞ ꗪ. ꖏꖷ ꕉꖸꔧ ꖏ ꖸ ꕚꕌꘂ ꗷꔤ ꕞ ꘃꖷ ꘉꔧ ꗠꖻ ꕞ ꖴꘋ ꔳꕩ ꕉꖸ ꗳ."

IPA: /adama ɗeŋ nũ g͡bi tɔŋ maⁿd͡ʒa ɗeŋ nũ wa anũa wolo kiːjɛ fɛ, amũ ɓɛː siː lɔⁿɗɔɛ wa ɓɛ anũa kowa. aⁿɗa ko tɛmaː lɔ ka sɔ amũ anũ fala ɓɛ. komũ anũhĩ ko nũ tahajɛ lɛi la kɛmũ nɛ̃hĩ ɲɔ̃ː la kuŋ tija anũ tɛ./

English original: "All human beings are born free and equal in dignity and rights. They are endowed with reason and conscience and should act towards one another in a spirit of brotherhood."

== See also ==
- Vai syllabary
