= Loko people =

Ethnic group of Sierra Leone

Lokos (Landogo)
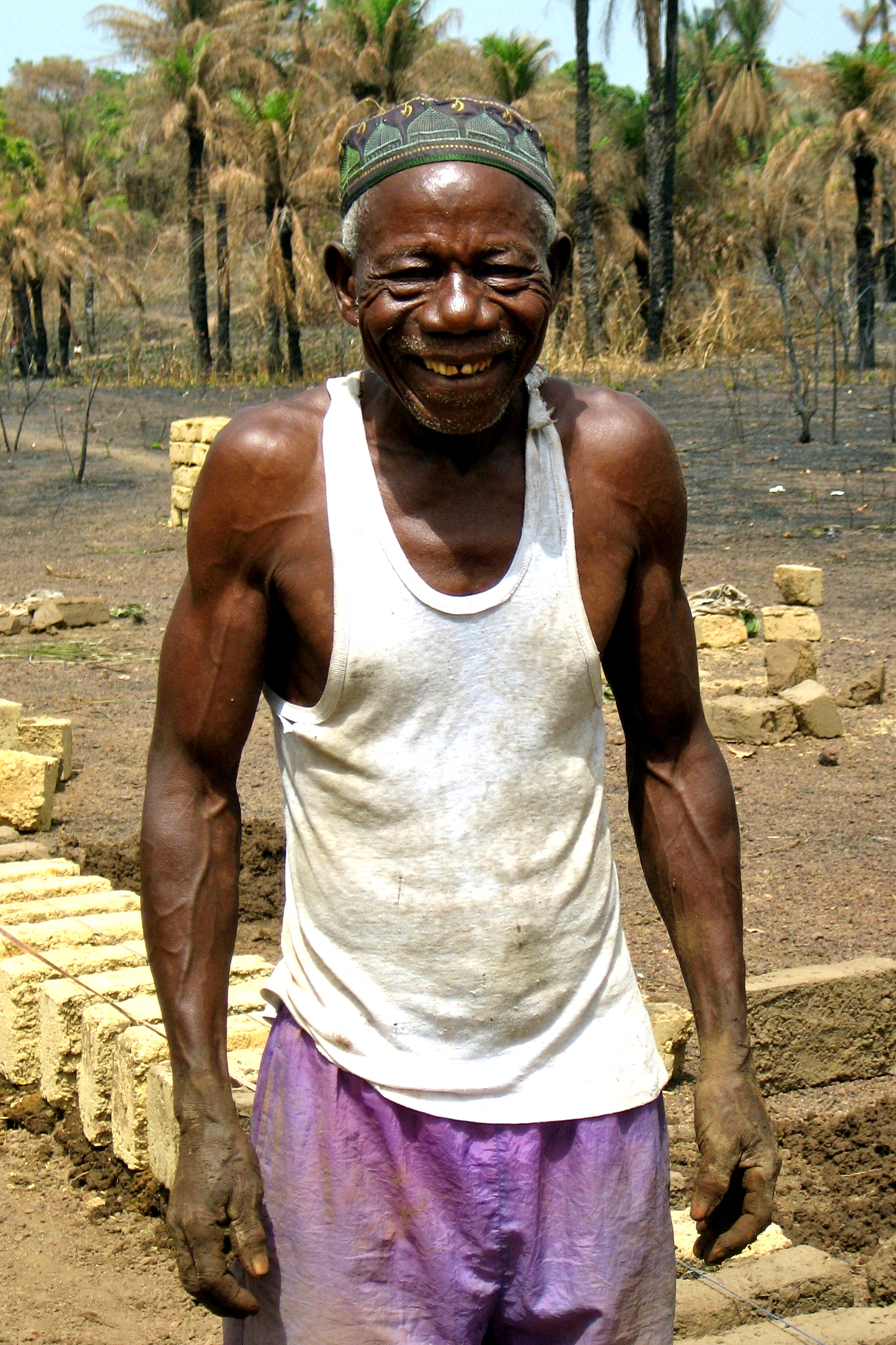
- A Loko stonemason and carpenter near Gbendembu

Total population
- 169,472

Regions with significant populations
- Bombali, Port Loko, Western Area

Languages
- Loko • Krio • English

Religion
- Islam 70%, Christianity 20%, Indigenous beliefs 10%

Related ethnic groups
- Mende, Loma, Gbandi, Kpelle, Zialo, Gola

The Loko (IPA: Lɔkɔ) are one of the indigenous ethnic groups in Sierra Leone. Landogo is used as an endonym for the people and language, but other groups refer to them as Loko. They speak a Southwestern Mande language that is also called Loko. The majority of the Loko people live in the Northern Province of the country, particularly in Bombali District, and around the capital city of Freetown in communities such as Regent. Important regional towns include Tambiama, Kalangba, Kagbere, Batkanu, and Gbendembu, though other groups such as the Mandingo, Fula and Temne peoples live there too.

The Loko belong to the larger group of Mande peoples who live throughout West Africa. The Loko are mostly farmers and hunters. Loko believe that most humanistic and scientific power is passed down through the secret societies, such as the Kpangbani. Most Loko are Muslim, they converted due to the growing influence of Muslim merchants in the area during the British colonial era.

The Loko people also utilize practices of the Bondo secret society which aims at gradually but firmly establishing attitudes related to adulthood in girls, discussions on fertility, morality and proper sexual comportment. The society also maintains an interest in the well-being of its members throughout their lives.

== Notable Loko ==
- Sheik I. Kamara, member of parliament of Sierra Leone
- Bai Kelfa Sankoh, paramount chief of Kambia District
- Ibrahim Sesay, member of parliament from Kambia District
