= Zialo people =

The Zialo
Ziolo

Regions with significant populations
- Guinea: 25,000

Languages
- Zialo, Looma, French

Religion
- Zialo religion, Islam, Christianity

Related ethnic groups
- Loma, Kpelle, Gbandi, Mende, Loko

The Zialo are an ethnic group of Guinea, who refer to themselves as Ziolo. Many speak the Loma language as well as others including Zialo, French, and Kissi. Since 2011, their Zialo language has been recognized as its own language, distinct from Loma and Bandi. Zialo country (le pays Zialo) extends 50 kilometres (31 mi) north of the Makona River, which forms part of the border between Guinea and Liberia.

== Population ==
As of 2011, there were an estimated 25,000 speakers of the Zialo language. Approximately 15,000 lived in 45 or so villages in Zialo country. Others live in urban areas such as the city of Macenta.
