= Religion in Liberia =

Religion in Liberia (2022 census)
1. Christianity (84.9%)
2. Islam (12.0%)
3. No religion (2.60%)
4. Traditional faiths (0.50%)

Christianity is the predominant religion in Liberia, with Protestantism being its largest denomination. Liberia is a secular state and its constitution guarantees freedom of religion. While most Liberians have religious affiliations, traditional belief systems are widespread.

Muslims are the largest minority group, largely coming from the Mandingo, Fula and Vai ethnic groups; traditional indigenous religions are practiced by 0.5% of the population, while 2.6% has no religion.

== Religions ==
=== Adherents ===
Christianity is by far the most common faith in Liberia, with recent surveys showing Christians making up 83-86% of the population, up significantly from surveys in the 1980s. By contrast, Islam has declined slightly from 14-15% in the 1980s to 11-12% in recent surveys. Traditional religions and non-religious individuals have seen greater declines.

Religious affiliation in Liberia
	Christian	Muslim	Traditional	Other/ Unknown	None
1984 Census	67.7%	17.4%	18.1%		
1986 DHS Survey	54.2%	17.2%	12.5%		18.9%
2007 DHS Survey	83.3%	14.1%	1.5%	0.8%	3.4%
2008 Census	85.5%	15.2%	0.6%	0.2%	1.5%
2013 DHS Survey	84.2%	14.8%	0.9%	0.3%	2.8%

=== Christianity ===
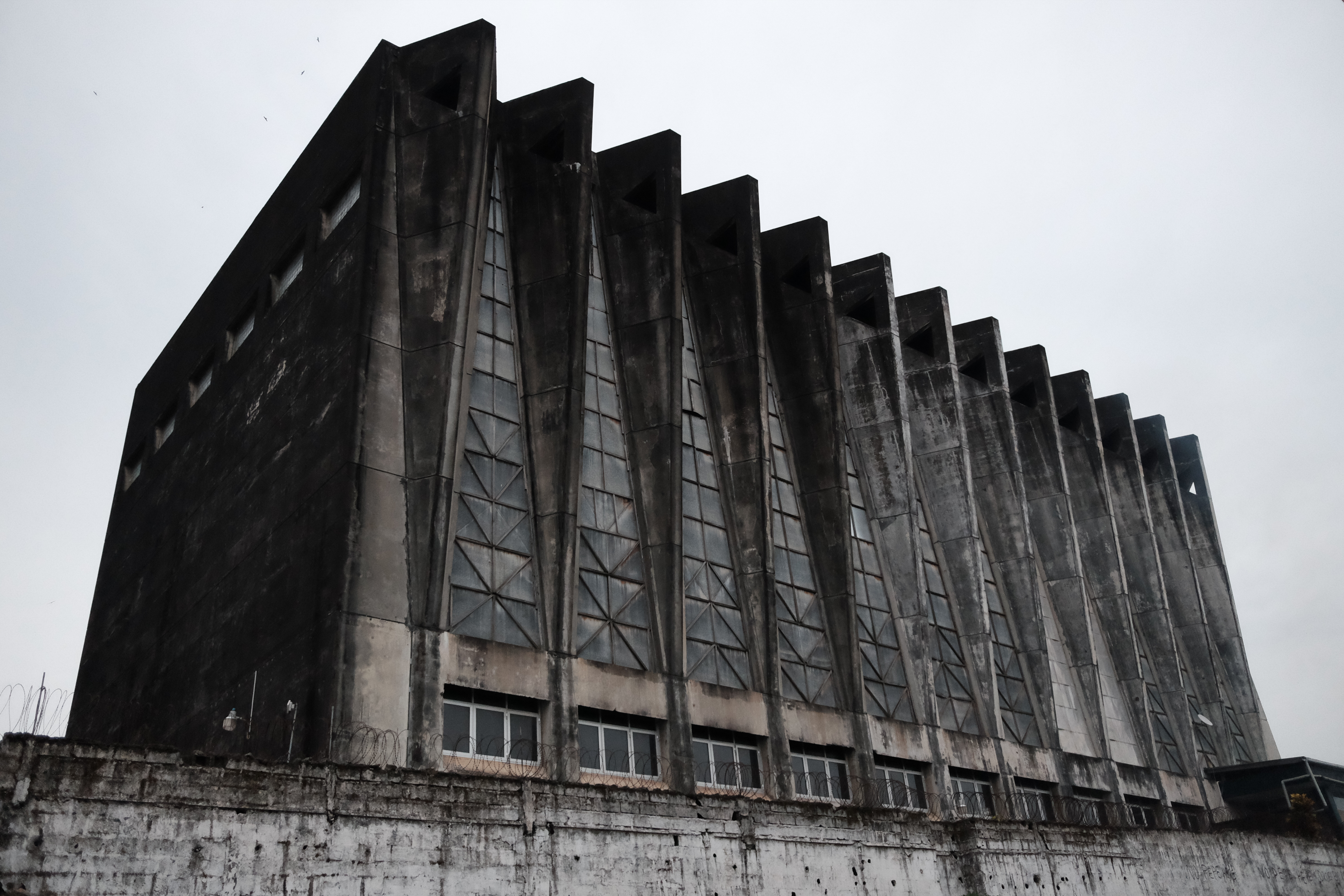
Episcopal Cathedral in Monrovia

Christian denominations include Baptist, African Methodist Episcopal and African Methodist Episcopal Zion churches, Presbyterian, Nazarene, Anglican, Lutheran, and a variety of Pentecostal churches. Some of the Pentecostal movements are affiliated with churches outside the country, while others are independent. There are also adherents of the Church of Jesus Christ of Latter-day Saints (Mormons), Seventh-day Adventists, and the Catholic Church. Christians live throughout the country.

In a religious context, the term kwi connotes a style of worship of a particular Christian church which is marked by formality and decorum. Kwi is a Liberian term used to connote Westernization. Services in churches considered to be non-kwi have more outward spiritualist expression, with dancing and even street processions in colorful costumes as key elements. Non-kwi churches also have self-proclaimed prophets who interpret dreams and visions, and prioritize a direct experience with the Holy Spirit. Liberia's educated elite have historically regarded the apostolic churches as churches of the uneducated and thus non-kwi.

The Lutheran hymn 'Come, Let Us Eat' was translated from Loma, a language spoken in Liberia. It was composed in the 1960s by Billema Kwillia, who converted to Christianity. Protestants are estimated to make up 75% of the populace.

=== Islam ===
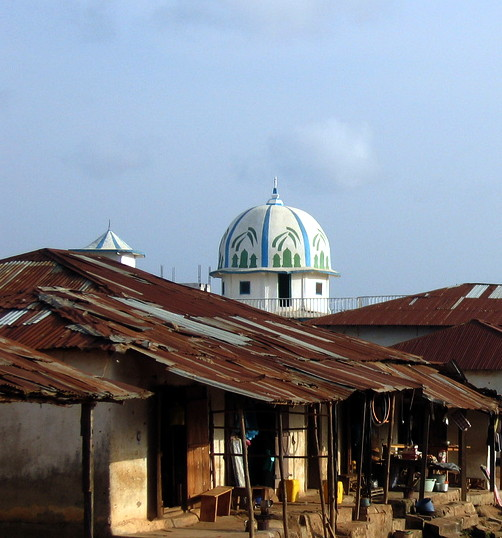
A mosque in Voinjama

The Muslim population is mainly found among the Mandingo, Gola and the Vai ethnic groups. The Vai and Gola live predominantly in the west. Mandingo reside throughout the country.

=== Traditional beliefs ===
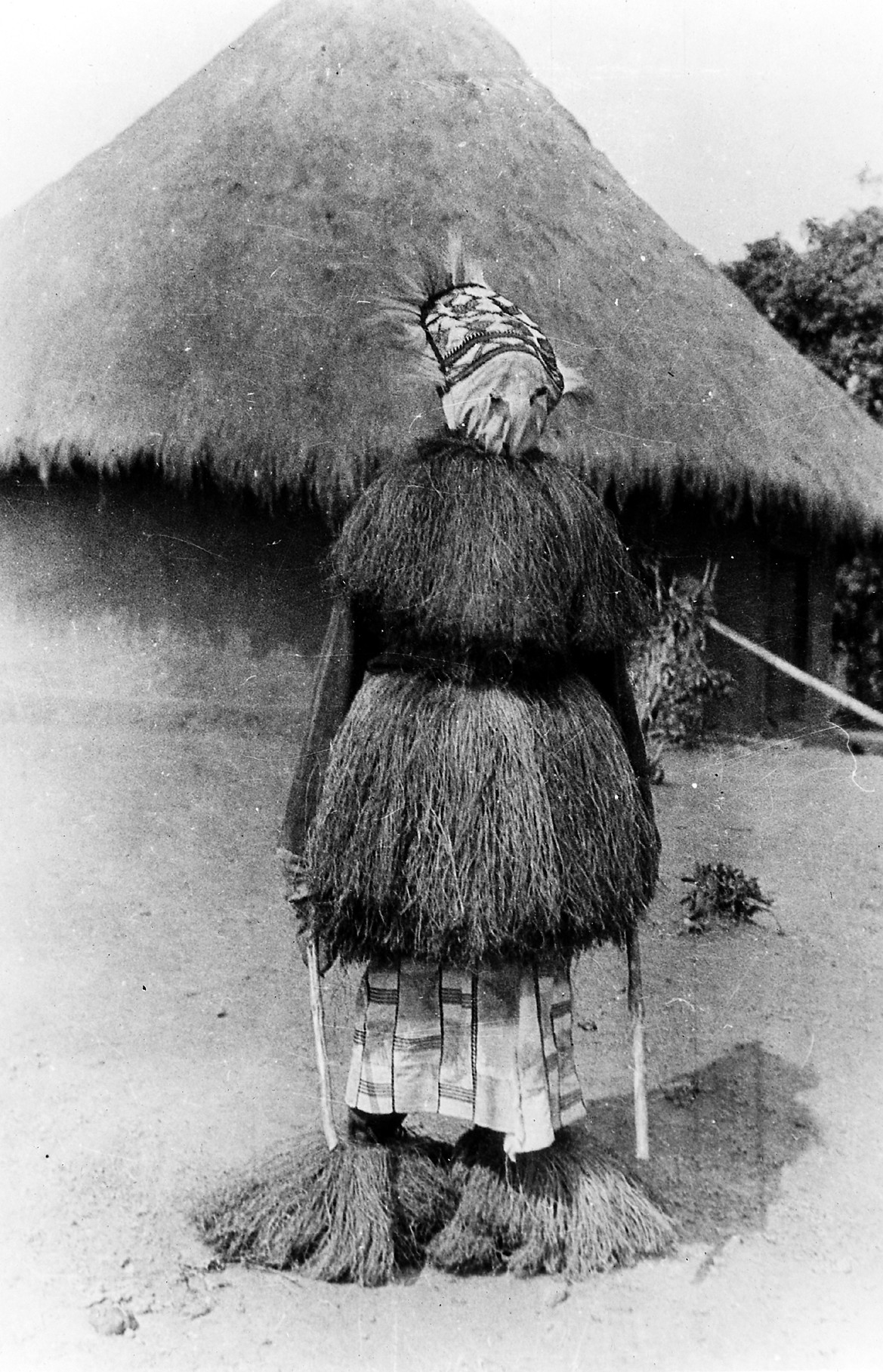
A masked Poro dancer.

A "vast majority" of Liberian Christians believe in a supernatural world of ancestral and bush spirits that impact daily life. Ethnic groups in all regions of Liberia participate in the traditional religious practices of the Poro and Sande secret societies, with the exception of the Krahn ethnic group, who have their own secret society.

Nigerian history scholar Ayodeji Olukoju has noted that "Liberian religious culture is characterised by a predisposition towards secrecy (encapsulated in the concept of ifa mo - 'do not speak it') and an ingrained belief in the intervention of mysterious forces in human affairs". Such beliefs prevail across social classes: "Both elite and non-elite Liberians usually attribute events to the activities of secret powers and forces".

"Beliefs include the conviction that there are deep and hidden things about an individual that only diviners, priests, and other qualified persons can unravel. This presupposes that whatever exists or happens in the physical realm has foundations in the spirit world".

==== Secret societies ====
The Sande society is a female secret society found in Liberia, Sierra Leone, Guinea and the Ivory Coast that initiates girls into adulthood, confers fertility, instills notions of morality and proper sexual comportment, and maintains an interest in the well-being of its members throughout their lives. In addition, Sande champions women's social and political interests and promotes their solidarity vis-a-vis the Poro society, a complementary institution for men. Today this social institution is found among the Bassa, Gola, Kissi, Kpelle, Loma, People and Vai of Liberia.

Throughout the region, the complementarity of men's and women's gender roles – evident in such diverse activities as farming, cloth production, and musical performances – reach full expression. The women's Sande and men's Poro associations alternate political and ritual control of "the land" (a concept embracing the natural and supernatural worlds) for periods of three and four years respectively. During Sande's sovereignty, all signs of the men's society are banished.

At the end of this three-year period, the Sande leadership "turns over the land" to its counterparts in the Poro Society for another four years, and after a rest period the ritual cycle begins anew. The alternating three- and four-year initiation cycles for women and men respectively are one example of the widespread use of the numbers 3 and 4 to signify the gender of people, places and events; together the numbers equal seven, a sacred number throughout the region.

=== Bahai ===
The Bahá'í Faith in Liberia begins with the entrance of the first member of the religion in 1952. By the end of 1963 there were five assemblies and Liberian Bahá'ís elected their first National Spiritual Assembly in 1975. The community was somewhat disrupted by the First Liberian Civil War but re-established their National Spiritual Assembly in 1998. Almost 9,500 Bahá'ís are believed to have been in Liberia in 2006.

== Dynamics ==
A large number of foreign missionary groups work openly and freely in the country. The Constitution provides for freedom of religion, and the Government generally respects this right in practice. Despite frequent interaction among religious groups, some tensions remain. Some societal abuses or discrimination based on religious belief or practice occur.

== Freedom of religion ==
In 2024, the country was scored 3 out of 4 for religious freedom.

== See also ==
- Roman Catholicism in Liberia
- The Church of Jesus Christ of Latter-day Saints in Liberia
