= Islam in Liberia =

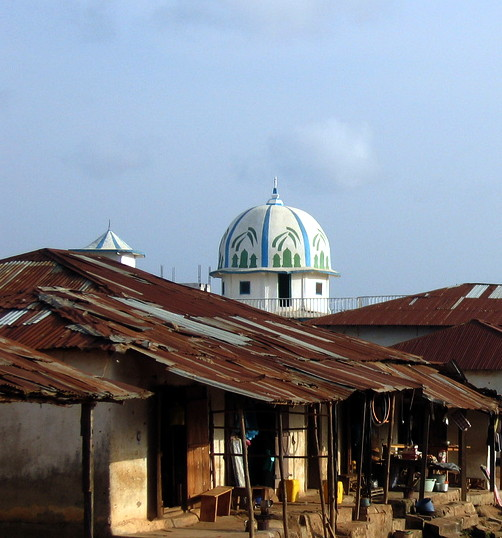
Mosque in Voinjama

Islam in Liberia is practiced by an estimated 12.2% of the population. The vast majority of Liberian Muslims are Malikite Sunni, with sizeable Shia and Ahmadiyya minorities. The primary Muslim ethnic groups are the Vai and Mandingo but also Gbandi, Kpelle and other ethnic groups. Historically, Liberian Muslims have followed a relaxed and liberal form of Islam that is heavily influenced by indigenous religions that were integrated into Islam when it came to Liberia in the 16th century with the collapse of the Songhai Empire in Mali. Islamic religious practices vary in cities and towns across the country. Younger Liberian Muslims, particularly in the cities along the coast, tend to be more secular but still practice Islam in everyday life. In rural areas, Liberian Muslims are more conservative in dressing modestly, performing prayers and attending religious studies. The practice of Islam in Liberia has been compared to Senegal and Gambia, with a strong orientation toward Sufism.

The major Islamic holidays, Eid el Fitr, Ramadan and Eid al Adha, called Tabaski Day, are celebrated annually in Liberia. People have begun to go on Hajj to Mecca in recent years. Joint English-Arabic language, Quranic, and Muslim universities and Islamic studies schools have opened and been rebuilt in the capital Monrovia, rural towns and other cities. Islam appears to be experiencing a revival alongside Christianity in the country as a result of the Liberian Civil War. America-Liberian Methodists, the first Christians in Liberia, arrived on January 7, 1822.

== History ==
Islam first appeared in Liberia during the 16th and 17th centuries, brought by Mandinka merchants and clerics. Further migration by Mandinka merchants to Liberia by the 18th century led to an increase of Islamic influence, eventually leading to conversions among several of the local population such as the Gola, Gbandi, Vai and Loma peoples. Muslims played a significant role in the construction of Liberia throughout its recent and modern history.

== Modern history ==
President Charles Taylor promulgated Islam for political reasons. Taylor, an ally of Libyan leader Muammar al-Gaddafi, trained in Libya before returning to Liberia. Taylor's government sent 220 Muslims to Mecca to do Hajj in 2001 and gave the Liberia Muslim's council a prominent building in Monrovia and the designation of two hours of national broadcasting weekly for Islam-related programming.

In modern times, countries such as Kuwait, United Arab Emirates, etc. have created Diplomatic relations with Liberia. Islamic organizations provide help to Liberian Muslims wanting to go on Hajj to Mecca. Rev. Dr. Laurence Konmla Bropleh Esq., Liberia's Information Minister and a reverend, attended as a guest speaker. Minister Bropleh called on the nation's legislature to designate non-Christian holidays as national holidays, specifically Hajj. He also suggested establishing a religious advisory board, representing all of the major religions practiced in Liberia, to advise the President. Methodist leaders condemned Bropleh's comments and accused him of fueling inter-religious tension.

== Destruction of mosques ==
A consequence of the civil war in Liberia was destruction of religious buildings, schools and places of worship across the country. In both urban and rural areas, government and opposition rebel forces destroyed numerous mosques belonging to Liberian Muslims from what the government considered enemy ethnic groups. Several massacres were also committed near mosques and schools. One of the most well known, barbaric and gruesome was the Bakerdu Massacre in the mainly Mandingo/Muslim Quardu Gboni District Lofa County on July 12, 1990. Over 400 civilians were killed (some by being burned alive) by Charles Taylor's National Patriotic Front of Liberia (NPFL). Destroyed buildings still stand on uneven foundations, raddled with bullet holes, demolished walls or simply blasted to skeletal buildings. Such destruction not only led to many faithful followers fleeing their hometowns, cities and villages for refugee camps in Sierra Leone, Ghana and other neighboring countries but also destroyed Islamic architecture that represented the blend between traditional Liberian, West African and Arab architectural design and influences. In recent years, diaspora Liberians abroad who practice Islam and Liberians in Liberia have participated in joint projects to rebuild and finance the reconstruction of mosques in many towns in the countryside.

== See also ==
- Ahmadiyya in Liberia
- Religion in Liberia
