= Zialo language =

Mande language of Guinea

Zialo
- Ziolo
- Native to: Guinea
- Native speakers: 25,000 (2010)
- Language family: Niger–Congo: Mande; Western Mande; Southwestern; Mende–Loma; Mende–Bandi; Bandi–Zialo; Zialo

Language codes
- ISO 639-3: zil
- Glottolog: zial1235
- ELP: Zialo

Zialo (self-identification Ziolo) is a language spoken by the Zialo people in Guinea.

The language of Zialo, which belongs to the Southwestern group of the Mande branch of the Niger–Congo language family, is spoken by approximately 25,000 people residing in the province of Macenta in the southeast of Guinea. The Zialo area covers over 50 villages (including two centers of subprefectures). Nearly a third of all Zialo live now in the nearby towns of Macenta and Guéckédou, as well as in the city of Conakry. The Zialo language does not have its own writing system; people use French in all official paperwork.

Zialo was recognized as a distinct language and studied by the Moscow-based linguist Kirill Babaev, member of the Russian Linguistic Expedition to Guinea, in January–February 2010. Before that, Zialo was considered a remote dialect of the language of Loma; however, significant differences were discovered between the two. The tonology and phonetics of Zialo do resemble Loma, but the lexicon and the morphological systems of Zialo are closer to those of Bandi and Mende. Zialo is characterized by the extensive use of nasal vowels and consonants, the wide system of initial consonant alternations, a great number of analytic verbal constructions of time and aspect, and over 15 sets of personal pronouns. Zialo speakers name five major dialects of the language: Bayawa, Wolo-Ziolo, Woyjawa, Kelighigo and Lawolozu, of which the last one seems the most specific.

The Zialo probably came to their present location from the south, the present-day territory of Liberia, as indicated by their legends. Nowadays, the majority of Zialo are Christians; there are also groups of Muslims and animists.
