= Kalangba =

Kalangba Ngangba, (in Loko)
- Country: Sierra Leone
- Province: Northern Province
- District: Bombali District
- Chiefdom: Ngowahun Chiefdom
- Time zone: UTC±00:00 (GMT)

Kalangba (/kælæŋbæ/; Loko: Ngangba) is a rural village in Bombali District, Northern Province, Sierra Leone. It is the headquarters for Ngowahun Chiefdom. It is situated about 15 miles (24 km) northwest of Makeni, the largest city in Sierra Leone's northern region. Kalangba is approximately 134 miles (216 km) north-east of the nation's capital, Freetown. It is a multicultural community. The majority of the inhabitants belong to the Loko ethnic group as well as the Fula and Mandingo. The Loko are the fifth largest ethnic group in Sierra Leone. As of the 2016 census, the population was 3,000.

== Etymology ==
A nearby settlement known as Makambie, founded by a warrior called Kambie, was merged with Kalangba. According to oral tradition, it is believed that the pre-colonial empire ruled by Bai Bureh, the hero of the Hut Tax War of 1898, extended from Kasseh in the Port Loko District to Kalangba. Oral tradition has also mentioned Gumbu Smart as associated with this settlement.

The inhabitants are mostly engaged in unsustainable subsistence livelihood activities – agriculture, fishing and hunting – for sustenance. The town lacks most of the basic needs and services required for a modern settlement. However, Kalangba has a junior secondary school, senior secondary school and extension college that offers various diplomas. The village has a primary health center that serves the community and the peripheral villages. Kalangba has also two elementary schools, one founded by the American Wesleyan Mission in the late 1940s and the other by the Sierra Leone Muslim Brotherhood in the late 1970s.

Kalangba is a religious community with converts and traditional Christians and Muslims. A majestic structure imposingly located at the center of the town, the Wesleyan Church of Sierra Leone Kalangba, has a capacity of over 500 people. Faith Baptist Church was founded in the early 1990s by two brothers, Reverends Today Koroma and Joseph Mojoko Koroma. There are three mosques, a court Barry and a market. Kalangba has become an trade center with Paramount Chief Kandeh Kpangai III at the helm of affairs. The chiefdom headquarters of NGowahun has recently seen the mining of lithium, gold and other precious minerals that is believed to generate income and create employment for the citizens.

== History ==
Present-day Kalangba is a merger of three prehistoric settlements – Macigolo to the northeast, Mandagai to the southeast and Makambi to the west. The Sesays, the Kargbos, the Fornahs and the Koromas lived in those settlements in the era of Trans-Saharan trade; up to the end of the trade in the 17th century, Kalangba was unknown because the trade in its real time never effectively reached that part of Sierra Leone.

Between the 15th and 18th centuries, there were intertribal conflicts all across West Africa from the Sahel to the coastlines. Much of the conflict was felt in Kalangba with the arrival of a splinter group of the Manes from Mandimansa (present-day Mali) who invaded Sierra Leone in the 16th century led by the great-grandfather of the Kamaras, Pa Tegbehun. Pa Tegbehun, known in Ngowahun as the great warrior, established his control over the three settlements in the first half of the 19th century from Gbangbawahun on the south side of Kalangba. At that time, the expansion of the British colony into the protectorate areas of Sierra Leone had just begun. However, colonial relationship with Kalangba was actually felt during the era of Pa Tegbehun's successor, Yangi Saio, better known as Kandeh Saio II.

Yangi Saio came to power during the spread of Islam in West Africa. It was during the time of Yangi Saio that the great Muslim cleric and prominent businessman Pa Alhaji Saccoh arrived. It was also during the time of Yangi Saio the three settlements were merged. The American missionaries from Oklahoma who had been in Sierra Leone since the late 1800s also came to Kalangba during that period.

Between the era of Yangi Saio and Kandeh Saio III, power shifted to Gbendembu for a while within the context of amalgamation of two chiefdoms, namely Gbendembu Chiefdom and Ngowahun Chiefdom. By the time Kandeh Saio III came to power, Kalangba had grown into a multicultural settlement. There were the Lokos, the Mandingoes, the Susu, the Fula, the Wolof, etc. The multiculturalism and increase in population was sped up with road construction between Makeni and Kamakwei and establishment of the ferry system on the Mabole River in the early 20th century.

== Infrastructure ==
The source of the water supply in Kalangba is underground water wells. There is no modern sewerage system.

Residents rely on generators for power as the village has no electrical grid.

== Education ==
=== Primary schools ===
- The Wesleyan Elementary School – founded in the 1940s by the American Wesleyan Mission of Fort Wayne, Indiana.
- The Muslim Brotherhood Elementary School – established in the 1970s.

=== Secondary schools ===
- Kalangba Junior Secondary School – a middle school.
- Kalangba Senior Secondary School – was under construction.

== Notable people ==
- Dr. Shekuba Saccoh was born in Kalangba, Ngowahun Chiefdom. He was a diplomat and a politician.
- John Amadu Bangura was born in Tambiama, Ngowahun Chiefdom. He was a former Governor-General of Sierra Leone.
