= Demographics of Liberia =

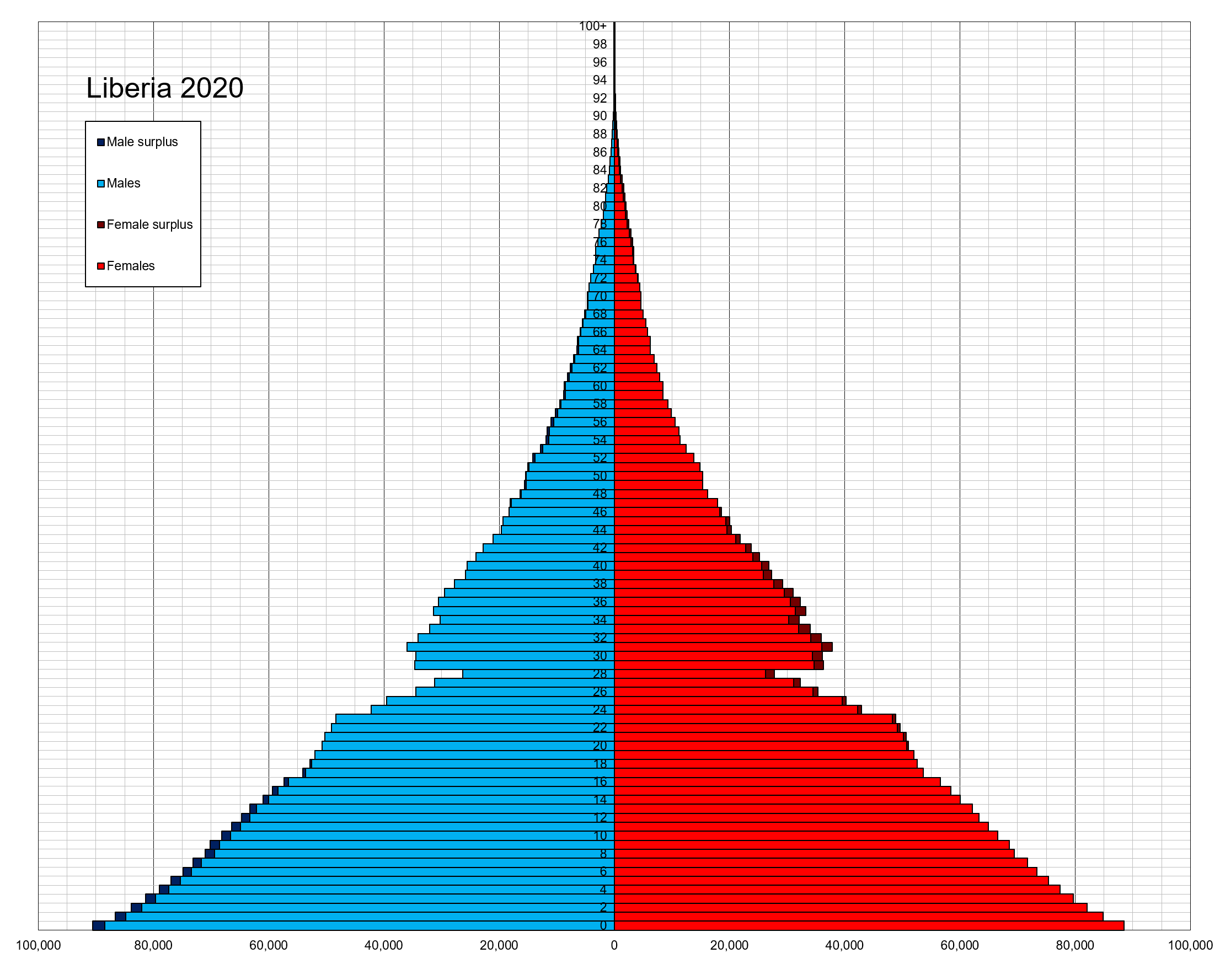
- Population pyramid of Liberia in 2020
- Population: ▲5,250,187 (2022)
- Growth rate: ▲2.99% (2022)
- Birth rate: 30.3 births/1,000 population (2025 est.)
- Death rate: 8.0 deaths/1,000 population (2025 est.)
- Fertility rate: 3.79 children born/woman (2025 est.)
- Net migration rate: -2.74 migrant(s)/1,000 population (2022 est.)

Age structure
- 0–14 years: 43.35%
- 65 and over: 2.83%

Nationality
- Nationality: Liberian

Language
- Official: English
- Spoken: Languages of Liberia

== Population ==
According to the 2022 revision of the World Population Prospects, Liberia's total population was 5,193,416 in 2021. This is compared to 911,000 in 1950.

43.5% of Liberians were below the age of 15 in 2010. 53.7% were between 15 and 65 years of age, while 2.8% were 65 years or older.

Estimates of Liberia's population prior to the 20th century are unreliable due to the lack of historical censuses. Estimates by scholars of pre-World War II demographics in Liberia differ wildly.

	Total population	Population Age (%)		
	Total population	0–14	15–64	65+
1950	911 000	41.0	55.9	3.0
1955	997 000	41.1	56.1	2.8
1960	1 116 000	41.4	55.9	2.7
1965	1 262 000	43.0	54.3	2.6
1970	1 440 000	44.1	53.3	2.6
1975	1 658 000	44.8	52.6	2.6
1980	1 923 000	45.5	51.9	2.6
1985	2 212 000	45.9	51.5	2.6
1990	2 127 000	45.6	52.8	2.6
1995	2 095 000	44.5	52.8	2.6
2000	2 847 000	43.6	53.8	2.6
2005	3 183 000	43.3	54.0	2.7
2010	3 994 000	43.5	53.7	2.8

Population by Sex and Age Group (Census 21.III.2008):

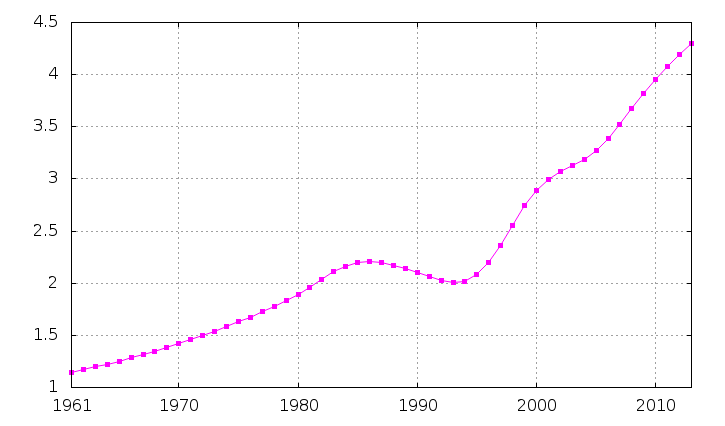
Liberia's population from 1961-2013. Liberia's population tripled in 40 years.

Historical population
Year	Pop.	±% p.a.
1984	2,101,628	—
2008	3,476,608	+2.12%
2022	5,250,187	+2.99%
Sources: Liberian censuses (1984–2022).

Age group	Male	Female	Total	%
Total	1 739 945	1 736 663	3 476 608	100
0–14	736 834	721 238	1 458 072	41.94
0–4	270 564	263 911	534 475	15.37
5–9	251 411	250 520	501 931	14.44
10–14	214 859	206 807	421 666	12.13
15–64	945 641	954 784	1 900 425	54.66
15–19	189 407	186 288	375 695	10.81
20–24	161 951	180 979	342 930	9.86
25–29	141 006	150 852	291 858	8.39
30–34	107 326	112 306	219 632	6.32
35–39	99 136	104 400	203 536	5.85
40–44	81 670	74 067	155 737	4.48
45–49	63 827	54 980	118 807	3.42
50–54	44 870	38 070	82 940	2.39
55–59	30 975	25 485	56 460	1.62
60–64	25 473	27 357	52 830	1.52
65-85+	57 470	60 641	118 111	3.40
65-69	19 250	20 557	39 807	1.14
70-74	12 343	13 403	25 746	0.74
75-79	11 580	11 333	22 913	0.66
80-84	5 408	6 599	12 007	0.35
85+	8 889	8 749	17 638	0.51

== Vital statistics ==
Population, fertility rate and net reproduction rate, United Nations estimates

Registration of vital events is in Liberia not complete. The Population Department of the United Nations prepared the following estimates.

Year	Mid-year population*	Live births per year*	Deaths per year*	Natural change per year*	CBR**	CDR**	NC**	TFR**	IMR**	Life expectancy (years)
1950	916,000	40,000	22,000	18,000	43.1	24.0	19.1	6.00	199.3	38.5
1951	933,000	41,000	23,000	18,000	43.7	24.2	19.6	6.04	198.8	38.6
1952	952,000	42,000	23,000	19,000	44.3	24.2	20.2	6.09	198.0	38.7
1953	971,000	44,000	24,000	20,000	44.9	24.2	20.6	6.12	197.3	38.8
1954	992,000	45,000	24,000	21,000	45.4	24.3	21.1	6.16	196.6	39.0
1955	1,014,000	46,000	25,000	22,000	45.8	24.5	21.3	6.19	197.2	38.8
1956	1,037,000	48,000	26,000	22,000	46.4	24.7	21.6	6.24	198.0	38.8
1957	1,061,000	50,000	26,000	23,000	46.8	24.9	21.9	6.28	198.7	38.7
1958	1,085,000	51,000	27,000	24,000	47.2	25.2	22.1	6.31	199.4	38.5
1959	1,110,000	53,000	28,000	25,000	47.7	25.4	22.3	6.35	200.1	38.4
1960	1,137,000	55,000	29,000	26,000	48.0	25.6	22.5	6.39	200.6	38.3
1961	1,165,000	56,000	30,000	26,000	48.4	25.7	22.7	6.45	200.7	38.3
1962	1,194,000	58,000	31,000	27,000	48.7	25.7	23.0	6.50	200.5	38.4
1963	1,224,000	60,000	31,000	28,000	48.9	25.7	23.2	6.56	200.0	38.5
1964	1,255,000	61,000	32,000	29,000	49.0	25.7	23.4	6.59	199.0	38.6
1965	1,287,000	63,000	33,000	30,000	49.1	25.5	23.6	6.62	197.5	38.8
1966	1,320,000	65,000	33,000	31,000	49.0	25.3	23.7	6.63	195.8	39.1
1967	1,354,000	66,000	34,000	33,000	49.0	25.0	24.0	6.65	193.7	39.4
1968	1,389,000	68,000	34,000	34,000	49.0	24.7	24.2	6.66	191.3	39.8
1969	1,426,000	70,000	35,000	35,000	49.1	24.4	24.7	6.64	188.5	40.2
1970	1,464,000	71,000	35,000	36,000	48.5	24.0	24.5	6.58	185.6	40.6
1971	1,502,000	72,000	35,000	37,000	48.0	23.6	24.5	6.54	183.1	40.9
1972	1,541,000	74,000	36,000	39,000	48.2	23.1	25.1	6.60	180.3	41.5
1973	1,583,000	77,000	36,000	40,000	48.4	22.8	25.6	6.65	177.7	41.9
1974	1,626,000	79,000	36,000	42,000	48.5	22.4	26.0	6.69	175.1	42.4
1975	1,672,000	81,000	37,000	44,000	48.6	22.1	26.5	6.74	172.4	42.8
1976	1,718,000	84,000	37,000	46,000	48.7	21.8	26.9	6.79	169.9	43.2
1977	1,768,000	86,000	38,000	48,000	48.7	21.4	27.3	6.84	167.6	43.6
1978	1,821,000	88,000	38,000	50,000	48.6	21.0	27.6	6.88	165.4	44.0
1979	1,876,000	91,000	39,000	52,000	48.5	20.7	27.8	6.92	163.4	44.3
1980	1,932,000	93,000	39,000	54,000	48.0	20.3	27.7	6.87	161.6	44.6
1981	1,990,000	94,000	40,000	55,000	47.5	19.9	27.5	6.83	159.9	45.0
1982	2,048,000	96,000	40,000	56,000	46.9	19.6	27.3	6.79	158.6	45.2
1983	2,109,000	98,000	41,000	57,000	46.5	19.4	27.0	6.76	157.8	45.4
1984	2,174,000	100,000	42,000	58,000	45.9	19.3	26.6	6.73	157.8	45.4
1985	2,240,000	102,000	44,000	58,000	45.7	19.7	26.1	6.69	159.9	44.7
1986	2,306,000	105,000	45,000	60,000	45.5	19.4	26.0	6.64	161.0	45.0
1987	2,372,000	107,000	47,000	60,000	45.0	19.7	25.3	6.57	164.0	44.5
1988	2,440,000	109,000	49,000	60,000	44.7	20.1	24.6	6.51	167.4	44.0
1989	2,508,000	111,000	51,000	60,000	44.5	20.5	24.0	6.43	170.6	43.5
1990	2,210,000	114,000	65,000	49,000	44.4	25.5	18.9	6.37	173.2	36.7
1991	1,939,000	85,000	40,000	45,000	44.6	21.0	23.6	6.32	175.0	42.8
1992	2,053,000	90,000	43,000	48,000	44.5	21.0	23.5	6.28	173.9	42.7
1993	2,133,000	95,000	46,000	49,000	44.6	21.5	23.1	6.25	174.8	42.2
1994	2,125,000	97,000	48,000	50,000	44.6	21.8	22.8	6.21	172.9	41.8
1995	2,142,000	94,000	43,000	52,000	44.7	20.2	24.4	6.17	166.1	43.9
1996	2,204,000	99,000	44,000	55,000	44.6	19.9	24.7	6.13	161.2	44.4
1997	2,383,000	100,000	39,000	60,000	44.4	17.6	26.8	6.08	151.5	47.8
1998	2,639,000	115,000	44,000	71,000	44.3	16.9	27.4	6.02	144.6	48.9
1999	2,790,000	122,000	45,000	77,000	44.1	16.1	27.9	5.95	137.3	50.0
2000	2,895,000	126,000	44,000	82,000	43.6	15.2	28.4	5.88	129.8	51.4
2001	2,982,000	128,000	43,000	86,000	43.0	14.3	28.7	5.77	122.0	52.8
2002	3,061,000	130,000	42,000	88,000	42.3	13.6	28.7	5.65	114.2	53.8
2003	3,085,000	131,000	43,000	88,000	41.7	13.9	27.9	5.55	108.9	53.0
2004	3,122,000	129,000	38,000	92,000	41.5	12.1	29.3	5.51	99.5	56.0
2005	3,266,000	133,000	37,000	96,000	41.5	11.6	29.9	5.52	93.2	56.9
2006	3,455,000	141,000	38,000	103,000	41.3	11.2	30.2	5.53	87.8	57.6
2007	3,633,000	147,000	39,000	108,000	40.9	10.8	30.1	5.46	83.3	58.3
2008	3,784,000	151,000	39,000	111,000	39.9	10.4	29.5	5.33	79.6	58.8
2009	3,905,000	152,000	39,000	113,000	38.9	10.1	28.8	5.17	76.5	59.2
2010	4,020,000	153,000	40,000	113,000	38.1	9.9	28.2	5.06	74.0	59.4
2011	4,181,000	155,000	40,000	114,000	37.4	9.7	27.7	4.97	72.0	59.6
2012	4,332,000	162,000	42,000	121,000	37.3	9.6	27.7	4.88	70.3	59.9
2013	4,427,000	160,000	42,000	118,000	36.1	9.5	26.7	4.75	68.8	59.9
2014	4,519,000	159,000	44,000	115,000	35.1	9.8	25.3	4.62	68.7	59.1
2015	4,612,000	158,000	45,000	113,000	34.2	9.7	24.5	4.52	67.7	59.1
2016	4,706,000	159,000	43,000	116,000	33.7	9.1	24.7	4.46	65.0	60.4
2017	4,797,000	159,000	43,000	116,000	33.2	9.0	24.2	4.40	63.7	60.6
2018	4,889,000	160,000	43,000	117,000	32.7	8.8	23.9	4.34	62.4	60.9
2019	4,985,000	161,000	43,000	118,000	32.2	8.7	23.5	4.26	61.1	61.1
2020	5,094,000	164,000	44,000	121,000	31.9	8.5	23.4	4.17	60.2	61.3
2021	5,205,000	166,000	45,000	121,000	31.5	8.5	23.0	4.09	58.8	61.2
2022	5,314,000	168,000	44,000	124,000	31.2	8.2	23.0	4.02	57.3	61.9
2023	5,433,000	170,000	44,000	126,000	31.0	8.1	22.9	3.95	55.9	62.2
2024					30.6	8.0	22.6	3.86		
2025					30.3	8.0	22.3	3.79		
* In thousands ** CBR = crude birth rate (per 1000); CDR = crude death rate (per 1000); NC = natural change (per 1000); IMR = infant mortality rate per 1000 births; TFR = total fertility rate (number of children per woman)

=== Demographic and Health Surveys ===
Total Fertility Rate (TFR) (Wanted Fertility Rate) and Crude Birth Rate (CBR):

Year	CBR			TFR		
Year	Total	Urban	Rural	Total	Urban	(Rural)
2007	37.6	32.5	40.4	5.2 (4.6)	3.8 (3.3)	6.2 (5.6)
2013	34.4	31.1	38.5	4.7 (4.0)	3.8 (3.3)	6.1 (5.1)
2019-20	30.1	27.5	33.6	4.2 (3.7)	3.4 (3.1)	5.5 (4.8)

View source data.
View source data.
View source data.
View source data.

Fertility data as of 2013 (DHS Program):

Region	Total fertility rate	Percentage of women age 15-49 currently pregnant	Mean number of children ever born to women age 40-49
North Western	5.8	10.3	7.1
South Central	3.8	6.7	5.8
South Eastern A	6.5	9.6	6.7
South Eastern B	5.9	9.2	7.1
North Central	5.6	10.2	6.2

== Ethnic groups ==
Ethnic groups in Liberia (2008)
Ethnic groups
Kpelle	20.3%
Other	20.1%
Bassa	13.4%
Grebo	10%
Gio	8%
Mano	7.9%
Kru	6%
Lorma	5.1%
Gola	5.1%
Kissi	4.8%

Liberia has 17 recognized ethnic groups representing the majority of the population. The largest groups include the Kpelle, Bassa, Gio, Mano, Grebo, Kru, Lorma, Gola, Kissi, Vai, Mandingo, Gbandi, Krahn, Sapo, Belleh (Kuwaa), Mende, and Dey.

== Citizenship and legal framework ==
The 1986 Constitution of Liberia restricts citizenship to persons who are "Negroes or of Negro descent", as stated in Article 27(b).

== Religion ==
Religion in Liberia (2008)
1. Christianity (85.6%)
2. Islam (12.2%)
3. None (1.40%)
4. Traditional (0.60%)
5. Others (0.20%)

According to the 2008 National Census, 85.5% of Liberia's population practices Christianity. Muslims comprise 12.2% of the population, largely coming from the Mandingo and Vai ethnic groups. The vast majority of Muslims are Malikite Sunni, with sizeable Shia and Ahmadiyya minorities. Traditional indigenous religions are practiced by 0.5% of the population, while 1.8% subscribe to no religion.

== Languages ==
English is the official language which serves as the country's lingua franca, and 27 indigenous languages are spoken in Liberia. Liberians also speak a variety of creolized dialects collectively known as Liberian English.

=== Linguistic classification ===
The indigenous ethnic groups of Liberia can be broadly classified into several major language families within the Niger–Congo language family:

- Mande-speaking groups, including the Kpelle, Gio, Mano, Lorma, Vai, Mende, and Mandingo
- Kru-speaking groups, including the Bassa, Grebo, and Kru
- Mel-speaking groups, including the Kissi
- Other groups such as the Gola language, often classified separately within the Niger–Congo phylum

== See also ==
- Persecution against Indigenous Liberians

== Bibliography ==
- Ciment, J. (2013) Another America: The Story of Liberia and the Former Slaves Who Ruled It. New York: Hill and Wang. ISBN 978-0-8090-9542-1
- Clegg, C. (2004). The Price of Liberty: African Americans and the Making of Liberia. Chapel Hill: UNC Press. ISBN 978-0-8078-2845-8
- Sundiata, I. (2003) Brothers and Strangers: Black Zion, Black Slavery, 1914-1940. Durham: Duke University Press ISBN 0-8223-3233-7
