= Kwi =

Kwi may refer to:

- Kwi (Liberia), a cultural concept of Liberia
- Kwi languages, a language family of southern Africa
- Kuwait International Airport (IATA: KWI)
- Klaus Werner Iohannis, President of Romania
- Bishops' Conference of Indonesia (Indonesian: Konferensi Waligereja Indonesia, a.k.a. KWI) is the episcopal conference of the Catholic bishops of Indonesia
