= Sanko =

Sanko or Sankō may refer to

- Sanko (surname)
- Sankō, Ōita, a town in Japan
- Sankō Shrine in Osaka, Japan
- Sankō Line, a railway line in Japan
- Sanko Grand Summer Championship, a defunct golf tournament held in Japan
- Sanko Group, the parent corporation of Turkish textile manufacturer ISKO
  - Sanko Park, a shopping mall in Gaziantep, Turkey
  - Sanko University in Gaziantep, Turkey
- Sanko Harvest, a ship that was wrecked in 1991
