= Sankoh (surname) =

Sankoh is a surname originating from West Africa and can refer to:

- Abu Sankoh, Sierra Leonean football manager
- Alfred Sankoh (born 1988), Sierra Leonean footballer
- Alimamy Bakarr Sankoh, head of the Sierra Leone People's Democratic League (PDL)
- Bai Kelfa Sankoh, Sierra Leonean politician
- Baïssama Sankoh (born 1992), Guinean footballer
- Foday Sankoh (1937–2003), Sierra Leonean rebel leader
- Gibril Sankoh (born 1983), Sierra Leonean footballer
- Lamina Sankoh (1884–1964), Sierra Leonean politician

== See also ==
- Sanko (surname)
