= Guilavogui =

Guilavogui is a surname. Notable people with the surname include:

- Josuha Guilavogui (born 1990), French footballer
- K. Guilavogui, Guinean politician and engineer
- Michel Guilavogui (born 1993), Guinean footballer
- Mohamed Guilavogui (born 1996), Malian footballer
- Morgan Guilavogui (born 1998), French-born Guinean footballer
- Pépé Guilavogui (born 1993), Guinean footballer
