= Billema Kwillia =

Literacy teacher, evangelist, and hymn writer

- Born: c. 1925 (age c. 99); Liberia
- Occupation: Teacher
- Known for: Hymn: 'Come, Let Us Eat'

Billema Kwillia, or Belema Kwelea, or Belema Kollia (born c. 1925) is a teacher and composer from Liberia. She composed the hymn "A va de laa" which was translated to English from Loma as "Come, Let Us Eat", and features in several modern hymnals.

== Biography ==
Kwillia was born around 1925 in Liberia. Little is known about her early life, other than she was taught to read Loma through a literacy programme funded by a missionary church. She converted to Christianity and became an evangelist, as well as working as a teacher.

Her most widely known work is the hymn "Come, Let Us Eat", which was originally written in Loma in the 1960s and was recorded by Margaret Miller. Miller was an American missionary who worked at the Lutheran Literacy Centre in Wozi. She transcribed the Loma original "A va de laa" from a recording of a church service held in 1969. The song's structure is based on Liberian traditional "call and response" music. According to S T Kimbrough Jr. and Daniel W. Sopo, Kwillia had composed several hymns in Loma which were used by the Lutheran church there, of which Sopo had a list of seven.

"A va de laa" was first published in 1970 in Laudamus which was a hymnal produced for the international gathering of the Lutheran World Federation in Evian. However it was not translated to English until 2004. It has been arranged by several people, including by John Miller who set it for voices, piano and hand bells.

== Reception ==
The inclusion of Kwillia's works in western hymnals brought to attention the issue that Western notation is not able to capture the nuance of music from non-Western cultures. This can contribute to the Western version having little resemblance to the original. For "Come, Let Us Eat", this hymn is meant to be sung unaccompanied in unison, following Liberian practice; however most often in the west a keyboard instrument leads the tune. Madeline Forell Marshall has noted that it is not just the melody that western music can misunderstand but also the significance of the structure of the lyrics, as well as their content.
