= The Church of Jesus Christ of Latter-day Saints in Liberia =

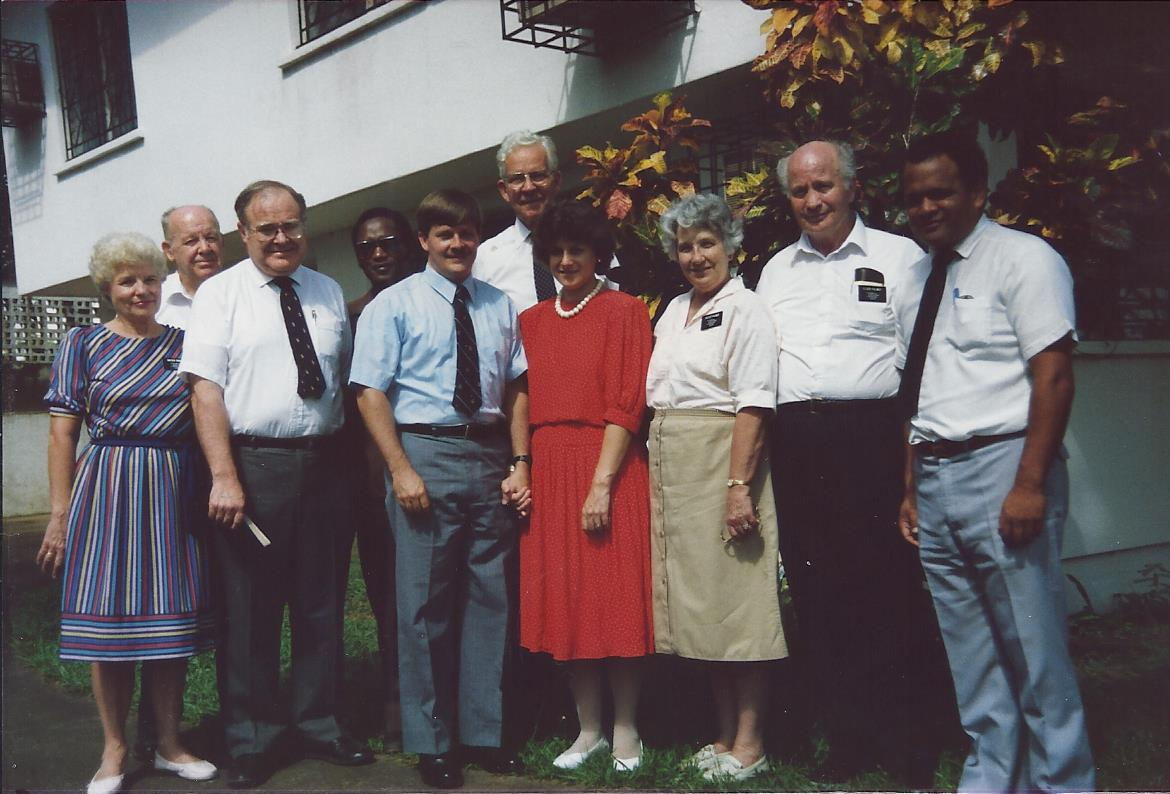
- Liberia Dedicated for the Preaching of the Gospel by Apostle Marvin J. Ashton. In attendance were Juanita & Philander Smartt, Alexander Morrison, Biz Kajunju, Steven Wolf, Marvin J. Ashton, Barbara Wolf, Jocelyn & J. Duffy Palmer, Thomas Peihopa.
- Area: Africa West
- Members: 25,767 (2025)
- Stakes: 7
- Districts: 2
- Wards: 51
- Branches: 35
- Total Congregations: 86
- Missions: 1
- Temples: 1 announced
- FamilySearch Centers: 17

The Church of Jesus Christ of Latter-day Saints in Liberia refers to the Church of Jesus Christ of Latter-day Saints (LDS Church) and its members in Liberia. At year-end 1986, there were fewer than 100 members in Liberia. In 2025, there were 25,767 members in 86 congregations. As of year-end 2025, Liberia had the second most members of the LDS Church per capita, behind Cape Verde.

== History ==
Membership in Liberia
Year	Membership
1986*	<100
1993*	1,400
1995*	1,600
1999	2,694
2004	4,218
2009	5,039
2014	8,081
2019	14,538
2024	23,217
2025	25,767
*Membership was published as a rounded number.

The LDS Church gained a formal presence in Liberia on 3 July 1987 with the arrival of J. Duffy Palmer and his wife, Jocelyn, as the church's first full-time missionaries in the country.

The origins of the LDS Church in Liberia go back about two years farther. Joe C. Jarwhel received the address of a missionary at Temple Square in Salt Lake City, Utah from a fellow Liberian who had just returned from a visit to Salt Lake City. Jarwhel sent a letter seeking more information about the LDS Church; this letter was forwarded to John K. Carmack, who was at the time president of the LDS Church's International Mission. Carmack sent Jarwhel a copy of the Book of Mormon. Jarwhel was a school teacher and used the Book of Mormon in his teaching.

Jarwhel's associate, John Tarsnoh, also learned of the Book of Mormon and created an organization called the Temple of Christ's Church, which began teaching the doctrines found in the book. Sometime in 1986, Thomas Peihopa, a Latter-day Saint from New Zealand who was employed in Monrovia, came in contact with this group. Peihopa taught them more of the doctrine of the LDS Church. During this time other members of the church living in Monrovia began teaching interested Liberians who were eager to learn more. Harvey Brown, an employee of USAID, began corresponding with church leadership in Salt Lake City to send full-time missionaries to Liberia due to the increasing interest in the church. In response, the Palmers were assigned to come to Liberia.

Due to the preparation for preaching that was laid by Jarwhel, Tarsnoh and Peihopa, the Palmers were able to quickly establish the LDS Church and were followed by the arrival of Philander and Juanita Smartt on 21 August as full-time missionaries. Tarsnoh was baptized on 22 August 1987 along with 46 others, mainly fellow members of his Temple of Christ's Church. The following day, two units of the church were organized, the New Krutown Unit presided over by Peihopa and the Congotown Unit presided over by Steven Wolf, an American citizen in Monrovia on a military assignment with the U.S. Coast Guard. Wolf's counselors were Mike Endecott, an American citizen working at the U.S. Embassy and new Liberian member Joseph Forkpah. The country was formally dedicated for the preaching of the gospel on 2 September 1987 by apostle Marvin J. Ashton and Alexander Morrison, the church's area president over the missions in England and Africa. The dedicatory service was conducted in the backyard garden of the home of the Wolf's along with the Palmers, the Smartts, Peihopa and Biz Kajunju.

By October 1987, church membership had increased to over 100 members. On 21 February 1988, Forkpah became the first Liberian citizen to serve as a branch president. The Liberia Monrovia Mission was organized with Palmer as president on 1 March 1988. Forkpah became the first Liberian citizen to be ordained to the office of elder in the Melchizedek Priesthood on 13 March 1988.

As civil war broke out in 1990, missionaries were transferred to Sierra Leone. Most of these missionaries were Liberians, but conditions were so bad in the country that it was felt to be safer to send them elsewhere. In 1991, the Monrovia mission was combined with the Ghana Accra Mission. A. Tarr, who had been a member less than four years and had been serving as the first counselor in the district presidency, became the church's presiding leader in Liberia with the departure of the mission president and most foreign nationals. In 1999, missionaries were able to return to Liberia. At the height of the civil war in 1992 about 70% of church members had fled the country. LDS Church leaders instructed those remaining to only hold small gatherings. Over the next seven years many church members returned, most of the eight branches that had existed at the time the war broke out were reorganized, and 43 Liberians managed to serve full-time missions in other countries, primarily Sierra Leone and Ghana.

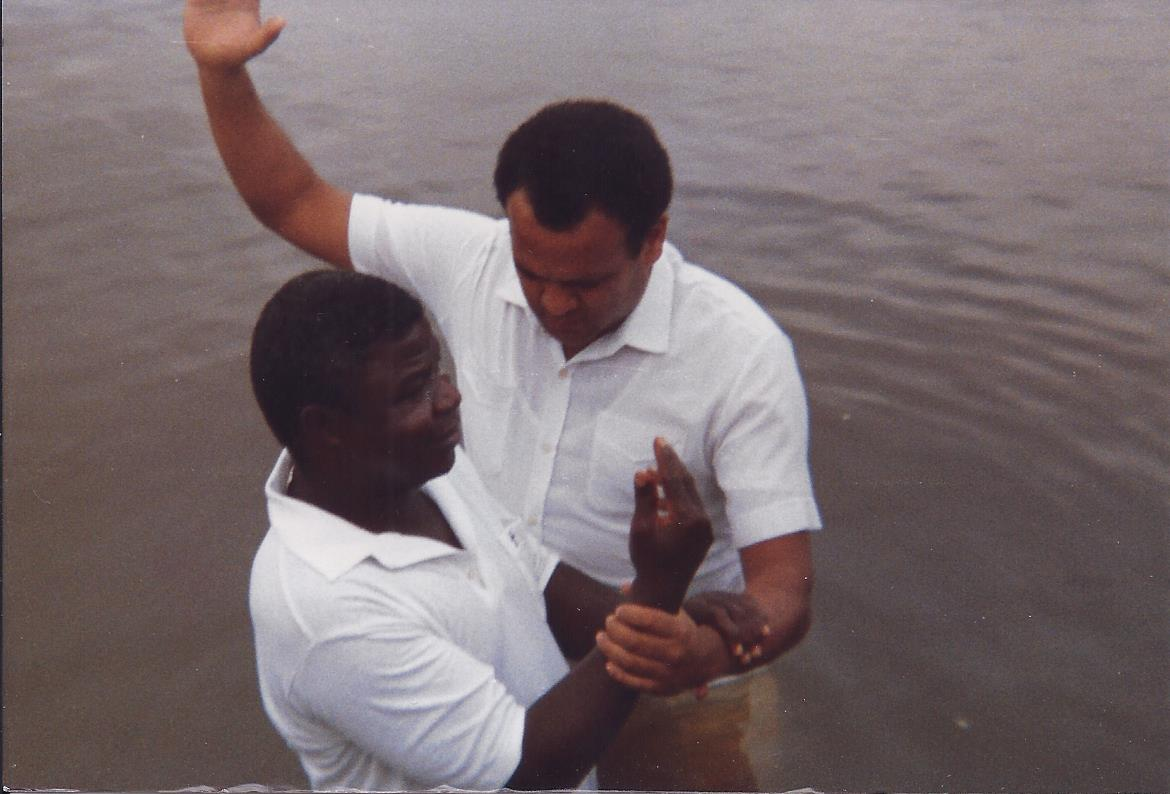
John Tarsnoh baptized by Thomas Peihopa

In June 2000, the Monrovia Liberia Stake was organized with Toby wleboe Tweh Sr. as president. Tweh had been among the members of Tarsnoh's Temple of Christ Church prior to joining the LDS Church. In June 2007, the stake was discontinued and divided into two mission districts. The next July a new mission, the Freetown Sierra Leone Mission, which covered Sierra Leone and Liberia, was organized. Liberia was converted into its own mission in July 2013.

2,200 converts were baptized in 2021, the most since the mission was established in 2013.

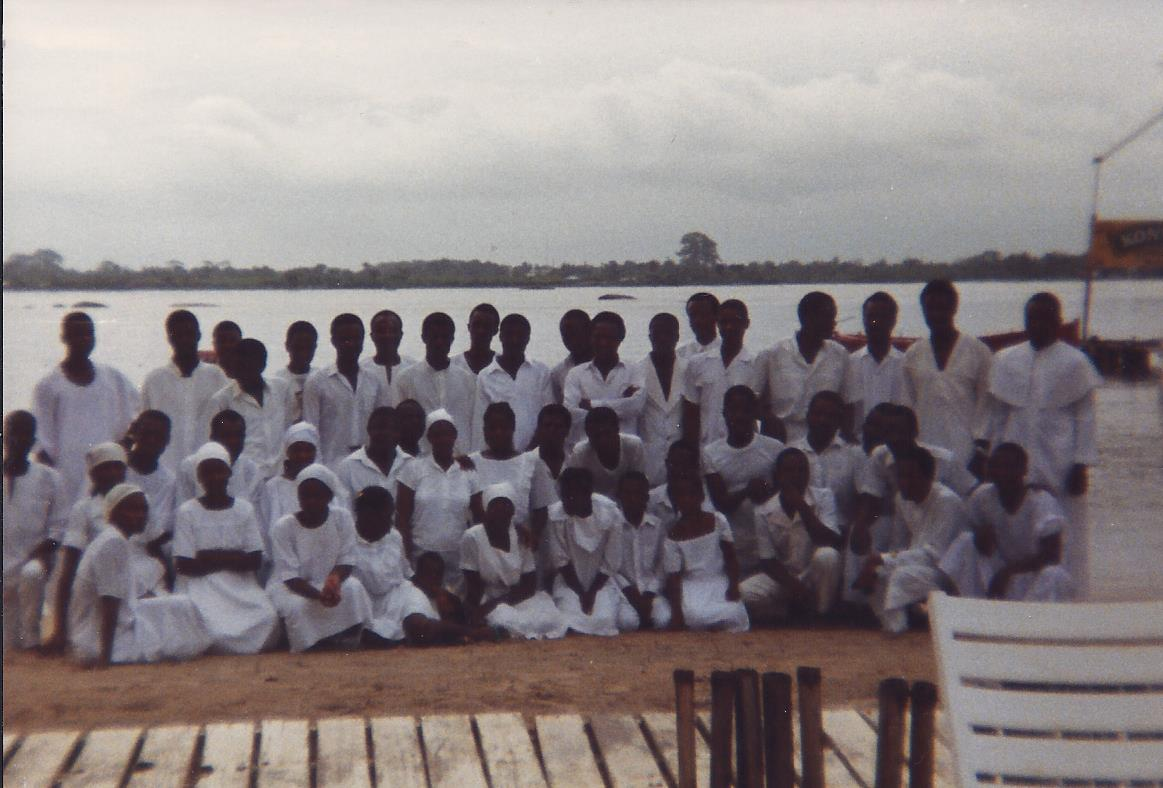
First group of 47 Liberians baptized on Aug 22, 1987.

== Stakes and districts ==
As of November 2025, Liberia had the following stakes and districts:

Stake/District	Organized	Mission
Caldwell Liberia Stake	10 Dec 2017	Liberia Monrovia West
Gardnersville Liberia Stake	16 Jun 2019	Liberia Monrovia West
Harbel Liberia District	12 Jan 2025	Liberia Monrovia East
Kakata Liberia District	10 Jun 2018	Liberia Monrovia East
Monrovia Liberia Bushrod Island Stake	27 Nov 2016	Liberia Monrovia West
Monrovia Liberia Stake	11 Jun 2000	Liberia Monrovia East
Paynesville Liberia Stake	10 Dec 2017	Liberia Monrovia East
Thinker Village Liberia Stake	2 Feb 2025	Liberia Monrovia East
Virginia Liberia Stake	13 Mar 2022	Liberia Monrovia West

Congregations not part of a stake or district include the following:

- Ganta Branch
- Gbarnga Branch
- Greenville Branch
- Harper Branch
- Pleebo Branch
- Totota 1st Branch
- Totota 2nd Branch
- Zwedru Branch
- Liberia Monrovia Dispersed Members Unit

The Liberia Monrovia Dispersed Members Unit serves families and individuals in Madagascar that is not in proximity of a meetinghouse.

== Missions ==
The Liberia Monrovia Mission was organized on March 1, 1988 but closed on February 12, 1991 due to civil war with work transferred to the Ghana Accra Mission. The mission was recreated in July 2013. Gary S. Price served as the mission president July 2019 to June 2022.

Mission	Organized
Liberia Monrovia East Mission	1 Mar 1988
Liberia Monrovia West Mission	1 Jul 2026

=== 2014 West Africa Ebola outbreak ===
After two church members died during the 2014 West Africa Ebola outbreak, the LDS Church required its missionaries to remain in their apartments as a precautionary measure. On August 1, 2014, the LDS Church announced that it would transfer all of its 274 missionaries out of Sierra Leone and Liberia, thereby closing the Liberia Monrovia Mission for the duration of the outbreak. In July 2015, a new mission president returned to Liberia to reopen the mission. New missionaries were called and a number or current missionaries were reassigned to the Liberia Monrovia Mission to assist in reopening the mission.

== Temples ==
On October 3, 2021, church president Russell M. Nelson announced plans in general conference to construct the Monrovia Liberia Temple.

296. Monrovia Liberia Temple (Announced); Official website; News & images	
Location: Announced:	Monrovia, Liberia; 3 October 2021 by Russell M. Nelson

== See also ==
Religion in Liberia

- 2010 Deseret News Church Almanac (Salt Lake City, Utah: Deseret News, 2009) pp. 518–519, 571.
- E. Dale LeBaron. "Liberia" in Arnold K. Garr, Donald Q. Cannon and Richard O. Cowan, ed., Encyclopedia of Church History (Salt Lake City: Deseret Book, 2000) p. 662.
