= Shekuba Saccoh =

Sierra Leonean diplomat

Alhaji Shekouba Saccoh

Sierra Leone Ambassador to Guinea
- Incumbent
- Assumed office 1998
- President: Alhaji Ahmad Tejan Kabbah and Ernest Bai Koroma

Personal details
- Born: Kalangba, Bombali District, Sierra Leone
- Party: Sierra Leone People's Party (SLPP)
- Education: Njala University: Njala, Moyamba District, Sierra Leone
- Profession: Diplomat

Alhaji Shekuba Saccoh (born in Kalangba, Bombali District) is a Sierra Leonean diplomat and the current Sierra Leone's ambassador to Guinea. He was appointed to the position by president Ahmad Tejan Kabbah. He is a member of the Mandingo.

He was the favoured choice by many prominent SLPP members in the Northern Province to be chosen as Solomon Berewa's running mate for the 2007 Presidential and Parliamentary elections. The position, however, went to foreign minister Momodu Koroma. He ran again for the SLPP leadership at the party convention held in on April 12, 2009, in the south-eastern city of Kenema but he came in third place behind John Oponjo Benjamin and J.B Dauda.

After losing at the convention, Saccoh accused the SLPP of being a Mende party. He claimed the only reason he lost the leadership is because he is not from the Mende ethnic group. Saccoh said he was unfairly treated because he is from the minority Mandingo ethnic group, the same ethnic group former Sierra Leone's president Ahmad Tejan Kabbah belongs to.
