= Wealth in people =

Concept developed by anthropologists and historians

Wealth in people (sometimes written wealth-in-people) is a concept developed by anthropologists and historians to describe social systems in which status, power, and influence are achieved and mediated through the number of one's dependents, followers, or other social ties and affiliations. The dependent's labor generates material wealth, which is in turn used to attach further dependents. Such systems can therefore exist independent of or alongside other capitalist or monetary modes of value and accumulation. The concept is most commonly applied to ethnographies and histories of Africa, particularly the tropical equatorial regions.

== Origins of term ==
Anthropologists have long emphasized the importance of ties and affiliations for gaining status. One of the earliest uses of the concept was by Max Gluckman in his 1941 work Economy of the Central Barotse Plain, with other similar uses by anthropologists such as Kenneth Little in 1951, Lloyd A. Fallers in 1964, and David Murray Schneider in 1968. However, the specific term "wealth-in-people" did not gain widespread use until the early 1980s. The first of this wave of anthropological studies was Caroline H. Bledsoe's 1980 work on Women and Marriage in Kpelle Society, which used the concept to examine how urbanization affects the strategies of Kpelle women and men to gain power an influence by binding themselves to their superiors through ties of marriage, clientship, and filial obligation. In Bledsoe's framework, people can be understood as resources, and the way society is ordered therefore is the result of rational choice.

In the 1990s, the concept of wealth-in-people became a widespread conceptual tool not only in anthropology but also history.

In the beginning of urbanization in Africa, they created mobile cities. If the land was no longer suitable for crops, then the people would have to change their location. The importance of Wealth in People in Africa could be related to the people in Africa having a primacy of exit. With there being so much land around, if the people did not like the way a ruler was leading, they could leave and start a new settlement. When the European settlers came, they also acknowledged the importance of Wealth in People. This is seen with European men like the laçandos who married prominent African women in order to gain more connections for trading. Additionally Wealth in People is also connected to Wealth in Knowledge. Wealth in Knowledge and Wealth in People are closely related; they both focus on the number of people or things that a person knows as a marker of his or her power in African society. This emphasis of knowledge could also be related to the heavy presence of oral history in African society. The griots were African oral historians and were highly ranked in society. The ability to learn the history like the Sundiata epic became a sacred tradition passed between father and son.

== Examples ==
The concept of wealth-in-people has been used to understand a range of societies, most of which are in central Africa.

=== Cameroon ===
Nicholas Argenti applies the concept to southern Cameroon to show the flip side of wealth in people, noting the marginalized status that would accompany men who were not able to acquire a sufficient number of dependents (including wives, children, and clients).

Jane Guyer and Samuel Eno Belinga also discuss the concept of wealth in people as it relates to Central Africa and, in particular, Cameroon. In “Wealth in People as Wealth in Knowledge: Accumulation and Composition in Equatorial Africa,” Guyer and Eno Beligna use Moneblum (The Blue Man), a Cameroonian epic by Daniel Osomo, as evidence of the role wealth-in-people plays in political mobilization. The epic tells the story of a son, Mekui-Mengomo, who challenges his father in a quest to marry. Rather than win through his own powers, Mekui-Mengomo must call on the community to help him in this quest. Each power he needs is owned by a different person, and each must come forth individually to supply it. Mekui-Mengomo drives this process, but he cannot do it alone, or through oppressive force. Instead he must attract people to his cause. The dynamic found in Mekui-Mengomo’s story reflects the broader culture in which “the ability to range over vast differentiated social and geographic space for exactly the right components to produce a particular desired goal was intrinsic to social power.”

=== Colonial Era ===
Jeffrey Herbst draws on the wealth-in-people concept when writing about power in pre-colonial Africa more generally, and about the challenges Europeans faced in trying to impose control within this environment. Herbst argues that the Europeans were unprepared for the dynamic they found in a “world where the extension and consolidation of power meant something very different from the broadcasting of authority in Europe or in postcolonial regions of the developing world.” Power in Africa was “nonterritorial,” a sharp contrast to the dynamics that had developed in Europe by the colonial era (though, Herbst argues, not necessarily earlier). Property was focused instead on people, who were comparatively scarce and very mobile. In order to gain power, a state or leader had to draw people in—and those people could leave, using the ample land resources available, if they were mistreated. Herbst argues that this challenge so frustrated Europeans that colonial states went to “elaborate lengths” to give the appearance of control, and responded with violence when these attempts failed or came under threat. Herbst thus shows that wealth-in-people had an impact not only on African societies before the colonial era, but also may have played a significant role in shaping and challenging colonialism as it developed.
