= Magbaiamba Ndowahun Chiefdom =

Magbaiamba Ndowahun
- Chiefdom
- Country: Sierra Leone
- Province: Northern Province
- District: Bombali District
- Capital: Kagbere

Population (2004)
  - Total: 8,655
- Time zone: UTC±00:00 (GMT)

Magbaiamba Ndowahun is a chiefdom of Bombali District in the Northern Province of Sierra Leone. The principal town lies at Kagbere.

As of 2004 the chiefdom has a population of 8,655.
