= Persecution against Indigenous Liberians =

Domination of indigenous ethnic groups in Liberia

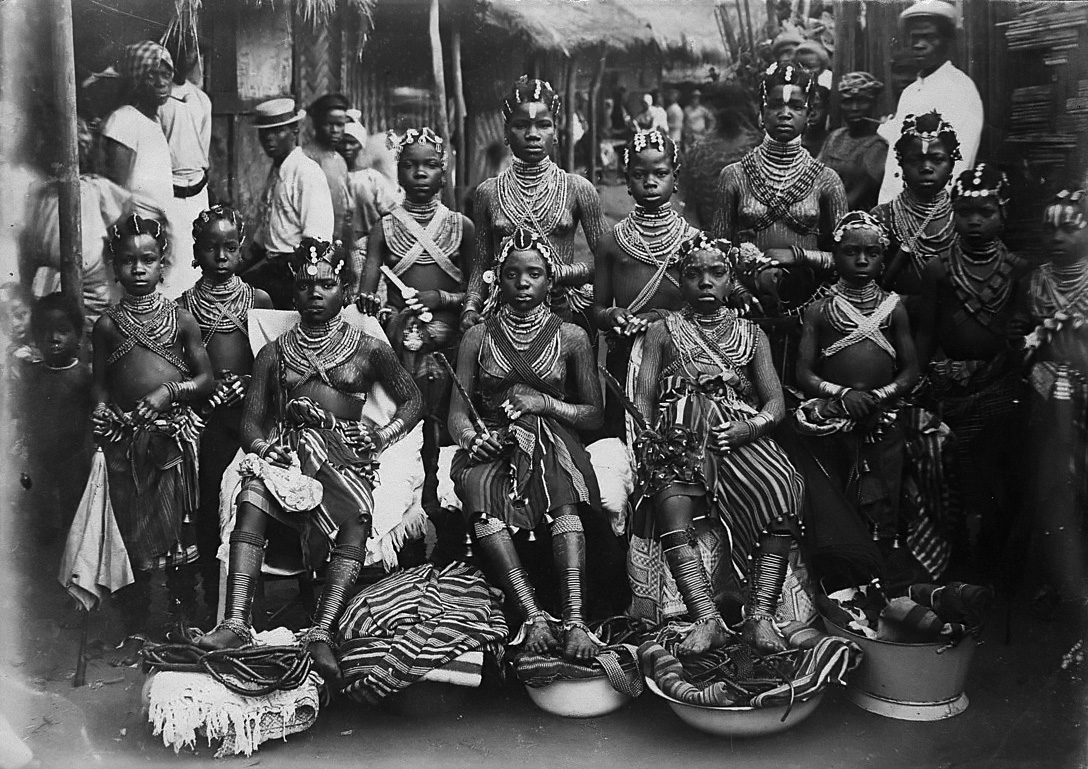
Indigenous Liberian women (1910)

The Persecution of Indigenous Liberians by Americo-Liberians refers to the political, economic, and social domination of indigenous ethnic groups in Liberia by the Americo-Liberian settler elite during the 19th and 20th centuries. Following the establishment of Liberia by settlers associated with the American Colonization Society, indigenous communities were frequently excluded from political power, subjected to coercive labor practices, and denied equal civil rights.
