= Gbendembu Ngowahun Chiefdom =

Gbendembu Ngowahun
- Chiefdom
- Interactive map of Gbendembu Ngowahun
- Country: Sierra Leone
- Province: Northern Province
- District: Bombali District
- Capital: Kalangba

Population (2004)
  - Total: 29,971
- Time zone: UTC±00:00 (GMT)

Gbendembu Ngowahun is a chiefdom of Bombali District in the Northern Province of Sierra Leone. The principal towns are Gbendembu and Kalangba.

As of 2004 the chiefdom has a population of 29,971.
