= Bai Kelfa Sankoh =

Sierra Leonean politician

Bai Kelfa Sankoh is a Sierra Leonean paramount chief representing Kambia District, one of the five districts that make up the Northern Province. He is a member of the Loko ethnic group.
