= Kwi (Liberia) =

Kwi is a Liberian term used to connote Westernization, adherence to Christianity (versus indigenous religions), a Westernized first name and surname, literacy through a Western-style education, and adherence to a cash economy instead of a subsistence economy, regardless of an individual's ethnic origin. However, it has historically denoted strong adherence to Americo-Liberian cultural norms, although one need not identify as ethnically Americo-Liberian in order to be kwi.

== Etymology ==
The term kwi has roots in the Kpelle word kwi-nuu (foreigner or civilized person). The Kpelle tribal members defined kwi as a person who spoke fluent English and wore Western attire. They also associated kwi status with Monrovia, Liberia's capital city, which they referred to kwi-taa (foreigner town or civilized town).

The Kru tribe also used the term kwi to identify the Americo-Liberian settlers - many of whom were mulattoes - and it was the same word that Krus used to describe whites.

== Evolution of the term ==
The term was first used in the 1800s by indigenous Africans to identify Americo-Liberian settlers and any other foreigners as outsiders not indigenous to the area. However, the term was adopted by Americo-Liberians as a synonym for civilized. Indigenous Africans later adopted the new definition as a result of missionary education and labor migration along Liberia's coast.

Before the Liberian Civil War, the most important feature of Liberian social stratification was civilization, with kwi status as the determining factor.

Kwi status was defined by Americo-Liberians by family background, education, church membership (particularly in a mainstream Protestant denomination), and other social relationships. Kwi status became a prerequisite for a favored position among the Americo-Liberian elite, where indigenous Africans were often sponsored by Americo-Liberian families to acquire kwi status and advance in Liberian society.

== Religious usage ==
In a religious context, the term kwi connotes a style of worship of a particular Christian church which is marked by formality and decorum. Services in churches considered to be non-kwi have more outward spiritualist expression, with dancing and even street processions in colorful costumes as key elements. Non-kwi churches also have self-proclaimed prophets who interpret dreams and visions, and prioritize a direct experience with the Holy Spirit. Liberia's educated elite have historically regarded the apostolic churches as churches of the uneducated and thus non-kwi.
