= Charles Fassou Sagno =

Guinean economist and politician

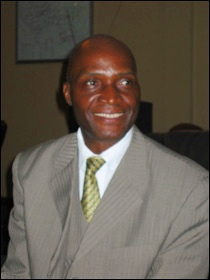
Charles Fassou Sagno

Charles Niankoye Fassou Sagno (born November 4, 1945, in Kindia) is a Guinean economist and politician. He belongs to the Guerze ethnic group.

A graduate of Economics and Finance and PhD in Econometrics from the University Paris IX Dauphine, he taught for a year before returning to Guinea. After a long career in the upper Guinean administration, as National Director of Planning, he became involved in politics and into the government of Lansana Conté from 1997 to 2004. From 1997 to 2000 he was Minister of Energy and Hydraulics. A Member of the Unity and Progress Party (PUP), he has since worked as an economic consultant for NGOs and American international companies operating in Guinea and resumed work as a government minister. During the President's second term in office, he took on the same duties, working with the new prime minister Mamadi Youla. On June 13, 2016, he was replaced by Madame Bangoura Gnalen Condé.
