= Laurence Konmla Bropleh =

Liberian politician, diplomat, clergyman, and lawyer

- Born: April 13, 1967 (age 59); Buchanan, Grand Bassa County, Liberia
- Citizenship: Republic of Liberia
- Education: Monrovia College; Lott Carey Baptist Mission School; Morgan State University; Wesley Theological Seminary; Louis Arthur Grimes School of Law
- Occupations: Attorney educator media personality politician presidential advisor
- Years active: 1990–present
- Known for: Humanitarian work, preaching, politics and teaching
- Political party: Independent (2018–)
- Relatives: Alfred Francis Russel; Beverly Page Yates; Amos Herring
- Family: Abner Bropleh (son); Lauris Bropleh (daughter Joseph D. Summerville (Great-great-grandfather); Josiah Hilton Davis (Grandfather); Sarah Luvenia Summerville (Grandmother); Charles Walker Brumskine (Maternal Cousin)

Laurence Bropleh (born April 13, 1967) is a Liberian politician, diplomat, United Methodist clergyman, lawyer, former Cabinet-Level government official, and business executive. Bropleh was Minister of information, Cultural Affairs and Tourism of the Republic of Liberia in the administration of President Ellen Johnson Sirleaf. He is the owner of a farm in Grand Bassa County and Law Practice on United Nations Drive in Monrovia. Bropleh received primary education in Liberia and advanced degrees including a Ph.D. in the United States.

== Early life ==
Born in Buchanan to Paul Bropleh a Kru-Fante judge, United Methodist clergyman, and educator and Joanna Elizabeth Bropleh (née: Davis) an Americo-Liberian educator, humanitarian and activist. His middle name, Konmla comes from the Klao language, meaning "Blessed" or "Lucky." Bropleh's mother ascends from two strong United Methodists families, the Summerville and Davis families, which had a lasting impact on his faith. Bropleh has raised the settlement of Upper Buchanan, Grand Bassa County. He and his six siblings were raised in close proximity to their maternal relatives, including grandparents, great-grandparents, aunts, uncles, cousins, and other relatives. As Bropleh was growing up he experienced an accident that left him blind in one eye. His mother encouraged him to not let his disability to hinder him, he frequently went to Monrovia for formal swimming lessons at the Ducor Hotel where he met his former wife. He later attended Lott Carey Mission School in Brewerville, Montserrado County, Liberia and was educated at the College of West Africa in Monrovia before moving to the City of Baltimore in the United States, where he studied at Morgan State University and Wesley Theological Seminary, respectively.

== Career ==
In the mid-eighties, while studying journalism and law in the United States, Bropleh's mother died in Liberia and his father suffered a stroke leaving him seemingly alone in Baltimore. In 1991, he became a student-pastor of Mt. Zion United Methodist Church a rural Methodist congregation in Dickerson, Maryland. In 1993, under Bropleh's commission, Mt. Zion merged with Warren United Methodist Church, another local church. Rev. Bropleh served as Pastor of Mt. Zion-Warren for seven years. In 1998, he was appointed Regional Executive Secretary for Sub-Saharan Africa by the United Methodist Church’s general board of Global Ministries managing at the time, forty-eight countries. While the pastor of Mt. Zion Warren Bropleh was an advocate for the youth, elderly, and low-class, he and his then-wife, Doris Minikon, founded a youth camp at Owens Park in Bealsville.

While at the UMC's Global Ministries Bropleh is accredited with the Ministries of Hope Programme along with other faith-based related initiatives that benefit people all over the African Continent, especially in conflict resolution and peacebuilding.

In 2003, Dr. Bropleh was named as the World Council of Churches (WCC) Ambassador and Permanent Representative to the United Nations, he is the first Liberian and African to be appointed to that position.

In 2006, Bropleh returned to Liberia and was appointed as Minister of information, Cultural Affairs, and Tourism of the Republic of Liberia in the administration of President Ellen Johnson Sirleaf. In 2009, Bropleh resigned as Minister per charges of corruption. Dr. Bropleh was later exonerated of charges of corruption after an investigation and trial.

Bropleh created a radio show entitled "Changing Minds Changing Attitudes: The Liberian Renaissance" on the Liberia Broadcasting System’s ELBC Radio Station which he regularly hosts every Tuesday at 8 PM. As of 2013, he does the same show in his hometown of Buchanan on Saturday mornings.

Dr. Bropleh ran for Grand Bassa County’s District No. 3 (Buchanan District) in the 2011 Liberian general election and the 2017 Liberian general election, respectively. He lost both races but continues to be a prominent citizen, humanitarian, and public figure in Buchanan and the country at large.

On February 14, 2019, Rev. Dr. Laurence K. Bropleh was appointed as Special Envoy and Advisor to President George Weah.

== Personal life ==
Bropleh currently practices law at Bropleh and Associates Law Firm in Monrovia and Buchanan, a law firm he founded after working and leaving Brumskine & Associates Law Firm. Bropleh was married to Doris M. Minikon, the daughter of a Liberian career diplomat, statesman, and former Deputy Minister of Information, Christopher Minikon and his wife Bernadette M. S. Minikon. Together, Bropleh and Minikon had three children: Ulrich, Abner, and Lauris. The marriage was dissolved in the early 2000s.

== Ancestry ==
Due to his Americo-Liberian ancestry, Bropleh has a varying degree of European, Native American and Portuguese, East Indian and West Indian ancestry. Both Bropleh's parents have ethnically diverse backgrounds. His mother was a descendant of mixed race; West Indians from Barbados and Bahamas and African-Americans from Virginia, Georgia, Mississippi and other regions in the Americas who were described as Octoroon, Mulatto, and Mixed Race. His father comes from the Kru and Fante ethnic groups who are mixed-race with varying degrees of Dutch, Portuguese and French ancestry.
