= Southwestern Mande languages =

West African language group

Southwestern Mande
- Geographic distribution: Sierra Leone, Guinea, Liberia
- Linguistic classification: Niger–Congo: Mande; Western Mande; Southwestern Mande
- Subdivisions: Kpelle; Loma-Mende

Language codes
- ISO 639-3: –
- Glottolog: sout2842

The Southwestern Mande languages are a branch of the Mande languages spoken in Sierra Leone, Guinea, and Liberia. There are around 2.8 million total speakers. The largest languages by far are Mende of Sierra Leone, with 1.4 million, and Kpelle of Liberia and Guinea, with 1.2 million.

== Member languages ==
- Mende, spoken by 1.4 million in the Southern and Eastern provinces, Sierra Leone
- Loko, spoken by around 140,000 predominantly in Bombali and Port Loko districts, Sierra Leone.
- Kpelle, spoken by around 1.2 million in central Liberia and Guinée forestière, Guinea.
- Loma, or Toma, spoken by around 300,000 in Guinea and Liberia.
- Zialo, once classified as a dialect of Loma, spoken by around 25,000 around Macenta and Guéckédougou, Guinea.
- Gbandi, spoken by around 100,000 in Liberia.

== Classification ==
A likely internal classification is as follows.

- Southwestern Mande
  - Mende–Loma
    - Looma
    - Mende–Bandi
      - Bandi–Zialo
      - Mɛnde–Loko
  - Kpɛllɛ
