= Sanko (surname) =

Sanko is the surname of the following people:

- Alina Sanko (born 1998), Russian model and beauty pageant titleholder
- Anton Sanko, American music composer, orchestrator and producer
- Erik Sanko (born 1963), American bass guitar player
- Galina Sanko (1904–1981), Soviet war photojournalist
- Laura Sanko (born 1982), American mixed martial arts commentator
- Oleg Sanko (born 1970), Russian footballer
- Olga Sanko (born 1978), Russian handball player

== See also ==
- Sankoh (surname)
