= Loma language =

Mande language spoken in West Africa

Loma
- Looma
- Lɔ̀ɔ̀màgòòi / Löömàgòòi / Löghömàgòòi
- Pronunciation: [lɔːmàɡòːi] [lɔɣɔmàɡòːi]
- Native to: Liberia, Guinea
- Ethnicity: Loma
- Native speakers: 560,000 (2017–2020)
- Language family: Niger–Congo: Mande; Western Mande; Southwestern; Mende–Loma; Loma

Language codes
- ISO 639-3: Either: lom – Liberian Loma tod – Toma
- Glottolog: loma1259

- People: Löömàgìtì [lɔːmàɡìtì] in Liberia; Löghömagiti [lɔɣɔmaɡiti] in Guinea
- Language: Löömàgòòi [lɔːmàɡòːi] Löghömàgòòi [lɔɣɔmàɡòːi]

A Loma speaker, recorded in Liberia.

Loma (Loghoma, Lɔɣɔma, Lɔɔma, Lorma) is a Mande language spoken by the Loma people of Liberia and Guinea.

Dialects of Loma proper in Liberia are Gizima, Wubomei, Ziema, Bunde, Buluyiema. The dialects of Guinea, distinguished as "Toma" (Toa, Toale, Toali, or Tooma, the Malinke name for Loma), are an official regional language.

In Liberia, the people and language are also known as "Bouze" (Busy, Buzi), which is considered offensive.

== Writing systems ==
Today, Loma uses a Latin-based alphabet which is written from left to right. A syllabary saw limited use in the 1930s and 1940s in correspondence between Loma-speakers, but today has fallen into disuse.

== Phonology ==
Loma has 21 consonants, 28 vowels, and 2 tones.

Loma consonants
		Labial	Alveolar	Palatal	Velar	Labial-velar
Nasal		m	n		ŋ	
Stop	voiced	b	d		g ~ ɡ̟	ɡ͡b
Stop	implosive	ɓ				
Stop	voiceless	p	t		k ~ k̟	k͡p
Stop	aspirated	pʰ	tʰ		kʰ	
Fricative	voiced	v	z		ɣ	
Fricative	voiceless	f	s		x	
Semivowel		w		j		
Approximant		ʋ	l ~ ɾ			

Loma vowels
	Front	Central	Back
Close	i		u
Close-mid	e		o
Open-mid	ɛ		ɔ
Open		a	

Every vowel has 4 forms: Short and non-nasalized, Short and nasalized, Long and non-nasalized, and Long and nasalized making a total of 28 vowels.

Loma has 2 tones: the High Tone (˦) ⟨á⟩ and the Low Tone (˨) ⟨à⟩.

== Sample text ==
The Lord's Prayer in Loma:

Yài è ga gé ɣeeai è gee-zuvɛ,
ɓaa ɣa la yà laa-zeigi ma,
yà masadai va,
è yii-mai ɣɛ zui zu è ɣɛ velei é ɣɛɛzu la è wɔ vɛ,
è zaa mii ŋenigi ʋe gé ya,
è gé vaa ʋaitiɛ zu ʋaa yɛ,
è ɣɛ velei gá ɓalaa gé zɔitiɛ zu ʋaa yɛga la gá ʋaa yega te va.
Mɛ lɛ kɛ tɛ-ga ɔ́ wo ga gíɛ,
kɛ̀ è gé wulo tuɓo-vele-yowũ nui ya.

== Hymns ==
In the 1960s several hymns composed in Loma by Billema Kwillia were recorded by the missionary Margaret D. Miller and then adopted by the Lutheran Church, first appearing in print in Loma in 1970. The most widely used, 'A va de laa' was not translated to singable English until 2004; it is also translated to German.

== Bibliography ==
- Rude, Noel. 1983. Ergativity and the active-stative typology in Loma. Studies in African Linguistics, 14:265–283.
- Sadler, Wesley. 1951. Untangled Loma: a course of study of the Looma language of the Western Province, Liberia, West Africa. Published by Board of Foreign Missions of the United Lutheran Church in America for the Evangelical Lutheran Church in Liberia.
