= Gbendembu =

Coordinates: 9°20′N 12°06′W

- Interactive map of Gbendembu
- Country: Sierra Leone
- Province: Northern Province
- District: Bombali District
- Chiefdom: Gbendembu Ngowahun
- Time zone: UTC+0 (GMT)

Gbendembu is the chiefdom seat town in the Gbendembu Ngowahun Chiefdom (an amalgamated Chiefdom), in the Bombali District, Northern Province of Sierra Leone. It is located about 30 miles north west of Makeni, Sierra Leone's Northern provincial city. Gbendembu is a multicultural settlement with significant number of Loko, Temne, Fula and Mandingo. The natives of Gbendembu are the Loko community, the fifth largest ethnic group in Sierra Leone, who are believed to have originated from Liberia.
