= Kagbere =

Kaghbere
- Country: Sierra Leone
- Province: Northern Province
- District: Bombali District
- Chiefdom: Magbaiamba Ndowahun
- Time zone: UTC+0 (GMT)

Kagbere is the chiefdom seat town in the Magbaiamba Ndowahun Chiefdom, in the Bombali District, Northern Province of Sierra Leone.
