= Loko language =

Mande language spoken in Sierra Leone

Loko
- Landogo
- Pronunciation: /læn.dɔɣɔ/
- Native to: Sierra Leone
- Ethnicity: Loko people
- Native speakers: 210,000 (2019)
- Language family: Niger–Congo: Mande; Western Mande; Southwestern; Loko
- Dialects: Landogo; Logo
- Writing system: African reference alphabet

Language codes
- ISO 639-3: lok
- Glottolog: loko1255

Loko, or Landogo, is a Southwestern Mande language spoken by the Loko people, who primarily live in Northern Sierra Leone. There are two known dialects, Landogo and Logo, which are mutually intelligible. Ethnic Loko outnumber native Loko speakers due to the linguistic encroachment of Temne and Krio and urbanization to Freetown, where Loko is internally and externally seen as a low-prestige language.
