= Kpelle people =

Ethnic group in West Africa

Kpelle
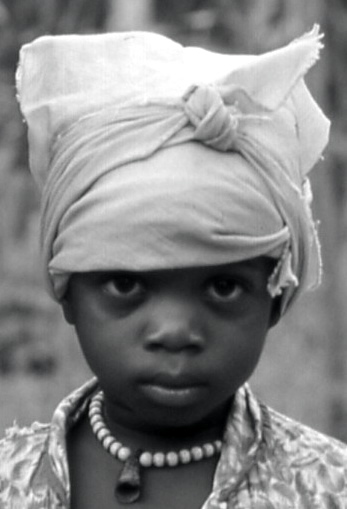
- A Kpelle girl from Liberia, May 1968.

Total population
- c. 2 million

Regions with significant populations
- Liberia: 1,058,448 (20.3%)
- Guinea: 1,004,475 (7.8%)
- Ivory Coast: 30,000

Languages
- Native; Kpelle; Also; French (in both Guinea & Ivory Coast) • English (in Liberia)

Religion
- Christianity, Traditional, Islam

Related ethnic groups
- Mende people, Kissi people, Loma people, Mano people, Vai people, Kono people, Gbandi people

The Kpelle people (Note: The Kpelle are also known as the Guerze, Kpwesi, Kpessi, Sprd, Mpessi, Berlu, Gbelle, Bere, Gizima, or Buni.) are the largest ethnic group in Liberia. They are located primarily in an area of central Liberia, extending into Guinea. They speak the Kpelle language, which belongs to the Mande language family.

Despite their yearly heavy rainfalls and rough land, Kpelle survive mostly on their staple crop of rice. Traditionally organized under several paramount chiefs who serve as mediators for the public, preserve order and settle disputes, the Kpelle are arguably the most rural and conservative of the major ethnic groups in Liberia.

The Kpelle people are also referred to as Gberese, Gbese, Gbeze, Gerse, Gerze, Kpelli, Kpese, Kpwele, Ngere, and Nguere.

== History ==
The Kpelle or Guerze lived in the Sudan region during the sixteenth-century, before fleeing into what is now Mali. Their flight was due to internal conflicts between the tribes from the crumbling Mali Empire. Some migrated to Liberia, Mauritania, and Chad. They still maintained their traditional and cultural heritage despite their migration. A handful are still of Kpelle origin in the Sudan.

Kpelle are also located in Mali and maintain their heritage.

The Kpelle also used to trade with the Muslim Vai and Mandingo who live in small numbers in the country and reside nearby. The Kpelle trade with Lebanese merchants, U.S. missionaries and Peace Corps volunteers.

There were 3 days of ethno-religious fighting in Nzerekore in July 2013. Fighting between ethnic Kpelle, who are Christian or animist, and ethnic Konianke, who are Muslims and close to the larger Mandinka ethnic group, left at least 54 dead. The dead included people who were killed with machetes and others who were burned alive. The violence ended after the Guinea military imposed a curfew, and President Conde made a televised appeal for calm.

== Location ==
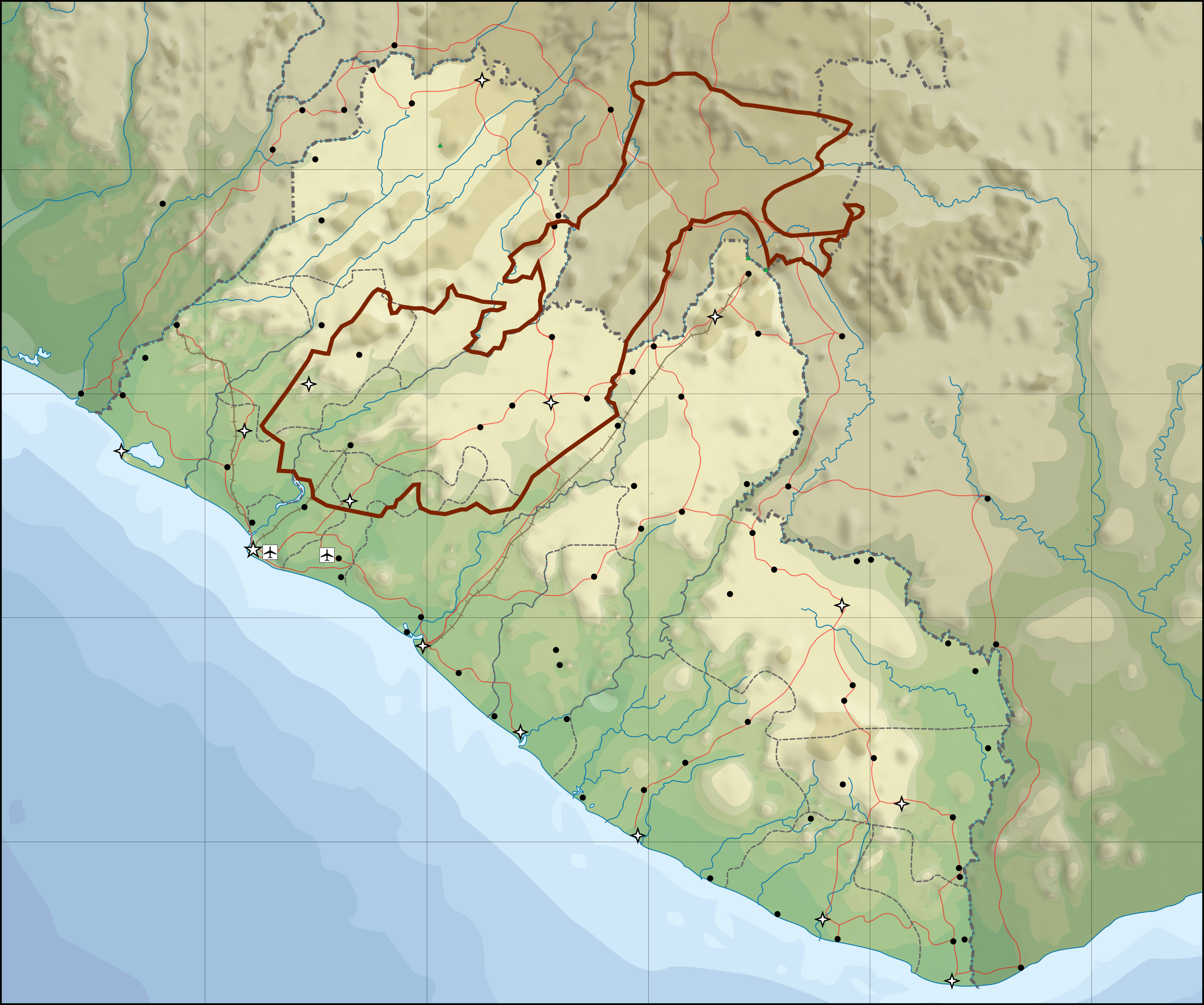
Map showing the Kpelle people, with Liberia highlighted

The Kpelle are the largest ethnic group of the West African nation of Liberia and are also an important ethnic group also in southern Guinea (where they are also known as Guerze) and north western Ivory Coast. in Liberia, most Kpelle inhabit Bong County, Bomi County, Gbarpolu County, and Lofa County. They are major food suppliers of the capital cities.

The terrain in the area includes swamps, hills and, in lowland areas, rivers. May through October brings their rainy season with an annual rainfall from 180 to 300 centimeters. The Kpelle territory sees the lowest temperatures dropping to 19 °C with the average temp around 36-degree C.

It is supplemented by cassava, vegetables, and fruits; cash crops include rice, peanuts, sugarcane, and nuts they also enjoy fufu and soup, sometimes the soup is spicy but it depends on the way they want it. Soup may be eaten as an appetizer or in conjunction to the main dish.

== Culture ==
Traditionally, the Kpelle have been farmers with rice as the main crop. The word Kpelle is often used as an adjective to refer to someone as hard working and very humble people in Liberia and Guinea.

Traditionally, a Kpelle family consists of a man, his wives and his children. The household has been the usual farming unit, and all the family members participate in daily farming work. Young children learn how to farm and help the older family members with farm activities.

In their social structure, leadership was very crucial. Every Kpelle tribe used to have a chief who oversaw their own interests as well as the interests of the society. These chiefs were recognized by the national government. They used to act as mediators between the government and their own tribes. Each town also had its own chief. The chiefs act as liaisons for different groups in the society. Anthropologists such as Caroline Bledsoe have characterized Kpelle social organization as one premised on wealth in people.

Their flight was due to internal conflicts between the tribes from the crumbling Sudanic empire.

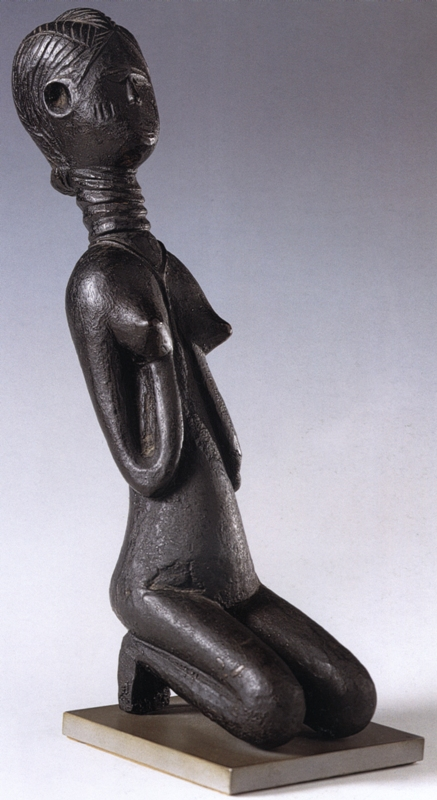
Kpelle wood made structure

== Kpelle surnames ==
B

Balamou, Balomou, Bamamou, Bénémou, Bimou, Blélamou, Blémou, Boamou, Bohamou, Bolamou, Boolamou, Bolomou, Bonamou, Bréhémou

D

Decamou, Delamou, Diémou, Doualamou, Dounamou, Douolamou, Douonamou, Dramou

F

Faghamou, Fanghamou, Fanhamou, Félémou

G

Gamamou, Gbalémou, Gbamou, Gbanamou, Gbanmou, Gbémou, Gbilémou, Gbilimou, Gegbelémou, Gnabalamou, Gnanawéamou, Gnékoyamou, Gamou, Gomou, Gonomou, Goromou, Gouamou, Goumou, Gromou, Guémou

H

Habalamou, Hagbalamou, Hamoutéamou, Haomou, Haoulomou, Hébélamou, Hébélemou, Hélémou, Honomou,

I

Iromou

K

Kanimou, Kanmou, Kolamou, Kolomou, Konomou, Korémou, Koulémou, Kpamou, Kpanamou, Kpoghomou, Kpoghonamou, Kpogmou, Kpohomou, Kpokomou, Kponhonamou, Kpoulémou, Kpoulomou, Kpowolamou, Kpowolomou, Kpowomou

L

Lamou, Loholamou, Lolamou, Loramou, Louamou, Loulémou, Lowolamou

M

Mahomou, Malamou, Malémou, Malomou, Manamou, Manémou, Manimou, Maomou, Maouomou, Minamou, Malmou, Molmou, Molomou, Moloumou, Monémou, Mulbah

N

Nanamou, Ninamou, Nonamou, Nonémou, Noramou, Nyambalamou (Niambalamou)

O

Ognémou, Olamou, Olémou, Onikoyamou, Oualamou, Ouamounou, Ouélamou, Ouémou, Ouiémou

P

Pilicemou, Pkogomou, Plégnémou, Pricémou

S

Sangbalamou, Sangbaramou, Saoromou, Saoulomou, Saouromou, Saromou, Sonomou, Soomou, Soromou, Souomou

T

Tohonamou, Tonamou

W

Wolamou

Y

Yarawéyamou, Yeamou

Z

Zagaimou, Zébélamou, Zégbélemou, Zogbélémou, Zomou, Zotamou, Zouémou, Zoutomou, Zowotamou

== Notable Kpelle people ==
- DenG, Liberian singer
- Knero Lapaé, Liberian singer
- Jeremiah Sulunteh, Liberian politician
- Moussa Dadis Camara, former Guinean military officer
- Daniel Goumou, Guinean footballer
- Boniface Haba, Guinean footballer
- Paul Haba, Guinean sprinter
- Remy Lamah, current Minister of Health and Public Hygiene of Guinea
- Alexandre Cécé Loua, Guinean diplomat
- Joseph Loua, Guinean sprinter
- Claude Pivi, former Guinean military officer
- Paul Pogba, French footballer
- Mathias Pogba, Guinean footballer
- Florentin Pogba, Guinean footballer
- Charles Fassou Sagno, Guinean politician
- Ilaix Moriba, Guinean footballer
- Oprah Winfrey, American media mogul

== See also ==
- Culture of Liberia
