= Gbandi people =

Ethnic group in Liberia

The Gbandi
Regions with significant populations
- Liberia: 105,250
- Guinea: 14,000

Languages
- Gbandi

Religion
- Gbandi religion, Islam, Christianity

Related ethnic groups
- Loko, Mende, Kpelle, Loma, Zialo, Gola, Vai

Gbandi (or Bandi, Bande, Gbande, Gbunde, Gbandi) is an ethnic group of Liberia.

== History ==
The Gbandi people, one of sixteen of Liberia's original ethnic groups, originated from Sudan - not to be confused with modern Sudan but of Western Sudan (Mali) in the late 17th century. Some may have also migrated, along with the Mende ethnic group, as political refugees from Guinea in the mid-16th century due to the Mandingo expansion. After moving to Liberia, the Gbandi settled in the county of Lofa, in the northern part of the country. The Gbandi are bordered by the Kissi, Mende, Gola, Kuwaa and Loma peoples.

The major demographic city for the Gbandi is Kolahun, which is also the district headquarters.

== People ==
The population is estimated at 107,000 people; of which many fled to Guinea and Sierra Leone during the Liberian Civil War. The Lokos of Sierra Leone are an offshoot of the Gbandi.

Gbandi people practice Islam and Christianity, as well as some traditional beliefs. 10% identify as Christian (with 1% Evangelical) and 10% Islamic. 80% practice traditional religions; many believe in animism.

Actual censuses of the Gbandi are rare to find, as the Gbandi do not register births or deaths.

Many Gbandi rely on agriculture for their economy and are primarily farmers. Mostly rice is grown in the swamps as well as the hillsides. The tilling and planting of the land is taken on by the entire family, regardless of age, and at least eight months of the calendar year are dedicated to planting, nurturing, and harvesting subsistence and cash crops. Planting of rice crops are done by aall able-bodied members of the family, though women are usually in charge of subsistence farming for the family. These crops, such as cabbage, potatoes, and okra, are grown behind the home. Young men and boys are typically responsible for the family's animals, usually cattle, sheep, and goats.

Girls are set into arranged marriages from childhood, usually infancy. Grooms are expected to pay the bride's family a dowry before the wedding. It is common that men may have more than one wife, and widows typically become married to their brother-in-law. The Gbandi live in what one anthropologist calls "a reciprocal obligatory society" between families in regards to marriage and lifestyle. Individualism is seen as a threat to the stability of the community. A woman may find a man more attractive for marriage if he has many wives. Alternatively, a man's social status is raised when he has two or more wives, though few have more than two or three. In the past, Gbandi Chiefs could have anywhere from thirty to fifty wives, which was meant to be reflective of the size of his rice fields. Parallel or familial marriage, such as cousin-marriage is prohibited. There is no word for "cousin" in the Gbandi language, as all cousins are referred to as brothers or sisters. Few marriages are truly dictated by those within them.

Sexual behavior is socially regulated and institutionalized. Girls are expected to remain virgins until marriage and are ostracized by their community if they are not. But, extramarital affairs are common. A woman's romantic or physical relationship with another man elevates her social status, as she is seen as presitigous and desirable.

Children also elevate social status, especially in the passing on of the father's name. Gbandi also believe that children are the reincarnations of ancestors and family, and thus childbirth is common. A child in Gbandi culture refers to an infant who still relies primarily on the mother for feeding and cannot walk to talk. Once a child can walk and speak clearly, they are no longer included as a "child". Those who do not have children are at a lower social status than those with children, and the more children a family has, the higher their social status will grow. The amount of children a family has garners them respect and is used as bragging rights in the community. Adolescent boys may choose to engage in marriage contracts with other male friends, as a show of lasting friendship, and to ensure that their children marry into each other's families.

== Religious Beliefs ==
The Gbandi believe in a polytheistic structure of religion, that permeates into every aspect of everyday life. Ancestoral spirits are held in the highest regard and the Gbandi believe in reincarnation. Bringing any amount of disgrace, through malicious behavior or committing falsehoods, to ancestors is incredibly serious and most follow rules out of respect for their ancestors rather than a duty to follow the law.

The Gbandi view death as happening for one of three reasons: either the ancestors called them, the person was killed by a witch, or was killed by "the witch within himself".

== Language ==
Gbandi is a Southwestern Mande language, which belongs to the Niger-Congo language family. There are six dialects of the language: Tahamba, Wawana, Wulukoha, Hasala, Lukasa, and Hembeh. The language of Gbandi is not found in any other regions of Liberia.

There is a 96% similarity between the six dialects, 83% are the most similar to the Mende dialect. The Tahamba dialect is used mainly for literature. There are believed to be about 160,000 native speakers of the language and is written in the Latin style.

Gbandi means a "reckoning force" or "hot". It is pronounced "Gbaa--ndi", stressing the sound of the "Gba".

== Notable Gbandi ==
- Dr. Stephen A. Yekehson - Late (professor and president of the University of Liberia)
- Dr. Harry Fombah Moniba - Late (Vice President under Samuel Doe)
- Jackson Fombah Kanneh - Journalist (Reporter for Voice Of America and Reuters News Agency)
