= Kpelle language =

Mande language spoken in West Africa

Kpelle
- 'Kpɛlɛwoo
- Region: Liberia, Guinea, Ivory Coast
- Ethnicity: Kpelle people
- Native speakers: (1.3 million cited 1991–2012)
- Language family: Niger–Congo?: Mande; Southwestern; Kpelle
- Writing system: African Reference Alphabet, Kpelle syllabary

Official status
- Official language in: Liberia

Language codes
- ISO 639-2: kpe
- ISO 639-3: kpe – inclusive code Individual codes: gkp – Guinea Kpelle xpe – Liberia Kpelle knu – Kono
- Glottolog: kpel1252

A Kpelle speaker, recorded in Liberia.

The Kpelle /kəˈpɛlə/ language (endonym: Kpɛlɛɛ) is spoken by the Kpelle people of Liberia, Guinea and Ivory Coast and is part of the Mande language family. Guinean Kpelle (also known as Guerze in French), spoken by half a million people, is concentrated primarily, but not exclusively, in the southeastern forest regions of Guinea bordering Liberia, Ivory Coast, and Sierra Leone. Half a million Liberians speak Liberian Kpelle, which is taught in Liberian schools.

== Phonology ==
=== Consonants ===
		Labial	Alveolar	Palatal	Velar	Labial–velar
Plosive	plain	p	t		k	k͡p
Plosive	voiced	b	d		ɡ	ɡ͡b
Implosive		ɓ				
Fricative	plain	f	s			
Fricative	voiced	v	z		ɣ	
Trill			r			
Lateral			l			
Nasal		m	n		ŋ	
Approximant				j		w

=== Vowels ===
	Front	Central	Back
Close	i		u
Close-mid	e		o
Open-mid	ɛ		ɔ
Open		a	

=== Tones ===
Kpelle is a tonal language with a three-way level tone distinction: high, mid, and low. Tone patterns within a word are limited, only including:

- High throughout: pɛ́le "also"
- Mid throughout: pɛlɛ "to start"
- Low throughout: pɛ̀le "small"
- High to low: pɛ̂rɛ "side of body"
- Mid to high-low: pɔmûŋ "germinate"

These patterns apply to words without affixes, as affixes carry their own tone patterns.

=== Stress ===
Words with high, high-low and low tone patterns are stress-initial. Mid to high-low have second-syllable stress.

== Grammar ==
=== Alienability and plurals ===
All nouns fall into either the alienable or inalienable category. Inalienable nouns are called dependent, and include integral parts of the possessor that cannot be discarded. This category encapsulates body parts, relatives, and membership names. Most Kpelle nouns have one form to represent both singular and plural, with number usually indicated by context. This is except for nouns for people, where the plural is indicated in different ways for dependent and independent nouns. While dependent nouns suffix -ni-, independent nouns have varied plurals.

Dependent nouns always require a possessor and cannot stand alone. For example, náŋ "father" is not a valid noun, where kúnaŋ "our father" is.

=== Compounds ===
Compounds are formed by combining two or more words. The compounding process transforms the final stem into having a low tone, or the tone 'high-low' pattern if the preceding word contains a mid-tone. The compounds are head-final, meaning that the base word being modified is the last morpheme. (e.g. mii "to eat" + sále "medicine" → mii-sále 'pill').

=== Noun phrases ===
The order in a noun phrase goes, from earliest to latest:

1. possessor
2. noun
3. adjective
4. numeral
5. specificity suffix
6. demonstrative pronouns

=== Adjectives ===
There are two classes of adjectives in Kpelle, predicating and descriptive. Most adjectives are predicating, being derived from verbs. This can be done through lengthening or changing the value of the final vowel. The suffix takes a high tone except for when the stem has a low tone, in which case the suffix. Examples include táma "to be plentiful" → támaa "much, a lot" and kpɔlu "ripen" → kpɔluɔ "ripe". Another method for deriving predicative adjectives is altering the tone of the word. These adjectives are then used as a verb, suffixing low tone -ì. These phrases follow the pattern object + adjective stem + suffix vowel + -ì. The noun that is described by the adjective takes the form of an object.

=== Locatives ===
Locatives, the set of adverbs or adjectives that place an agent or action in a location. There are multiple locative prefixes that Kpelle employs for different styles of location. Examples include: pɛrɛ "house" + mù "inside" → ɓɛ́rɛi mu "inside the house" and pɛrɛ "house" + lá "near" → ɓɛ́rɛi la "near the house". These can be taken also as the complement of a noun phrase to express explicit locationality. It can also be used as a noun phrase as the subject to express the location itself, and can be described with predicating clauses.

=== Pronouns ===
==== Subject pronouns ====
Kpelle has a markedly complex pronominal system, with sets of pronouns that differ often in tense and have distinct sets for affirmative and negative.

Affirmative 1 is used for present, future, and customary tenses. Affirmative 2 is used for past and hortative-consecutive tenses. Affirmative 3 is only used for conditional phrases.

Affirmative
	Affirmative 1		Affirmative 2		Affirmative 3	
	Singular	Plural	Singular	Plural	Singular	Plural
1st Person	ŋa	kwa	ŋá	kú	ŋà	kwà
2nd Person	ɓa	ka	í	ká	ɓà	kà
3rd Person	a	da	è(é)	dí	à	dà

Negative 1 is used for present, future, past, and hortative-consecutive tenses. Negative 2 is used for the customary tense. Negative 3 is used for conditional tenses.

	Negative 1		Negative 2		Negative 3	
	Singular	Plural	Singular	Plural	Singular	Plural
1st Person	fé	kúfé	fa	kúfa	nâi	kûi
2nd Person	ífé	káfé	ífa	káfa	dîi	kâi
3rd Person	vé	dífé	va	dífa	èì	dîi

== Sample text ==
The Lord's Prayer in Kpelle:

Kunâŋ gáa ŋele sui,
Tɔɔ ku iláai siɣe a maa waa.
Tɔɔ Ikâloŋ-laai é pá,
Tɔɔ ínîa-mɛni é kɛ́,
Nɔii ma ɓɛ yɛ̂ɛ berei gáa la Ɣâla-taai.
I kukɔ sâa a kuɣele-kuu tɔnɔ-tɔnɔ mii-sɛŋ;
I ipôlu fe kutɔ̂ŋ-karaa-ŋai dîa,
Yɛ̂ɛ berei kwa kupôlu fè la kuɓarâai ditɔ̂ŋ-karaa-ŋai dîai;
Tɔɔ kutúɛ kufe pili yee-laa-maa su,
Kɛ́lɛ, i kukúla mɛni nyɔ́mɔɔ su.
