= Gbandi language =

Mande language of Guinea and Liberia

Gbandi
- Native to: Guinea, Liberia
- Ethnicity: Gbandi people
- Native speakers: 160,000 (2014–2020)
- Language family: Niger–Congo ?: Mande; Western Mande; Southwestern; Mende–Loma; Mende–Bandi; Bandi–Zialo; Gbandi
- Dialects: Tahamba; Wawoma; Vukoha; Hasala; Lukasu; Hembeh
- Writing system: Latin

Language codes
- ISO 639-3: bza
- Glottolog: band1352

The Bandi language, also known as Bande, Gbande, Gbandi and Gbunde, is a Mande language. It is spoken primarily in Lofa County in northern Liberia by the Gbandi people.

Bandi has six dialects: Hasala, Hembeh, Lukasa, Wawana, Wulukoha, and Tahamba, which is the dialect used for literature. The dialects have a lexical similarity of 96% among one another, and 83% with the most similar dialect of the Mende language.

== See also ==
- Languages of Liberia
