= K. Guilavogui =

Guinean politician

K. Guilavogui is a Guinean politician and engineer and the Minister of Hydraulic works and energy in Guinea. He spoke at HYDRO 2006 in Porto Carras, Greece and at HYDRO 2007 in Huerta del Sello in Granada, Spain in which he spoke of Guinea's vast hydro potential and role it will play in meeting the regional power requirements of the country in the future.
