= Loma people =

West African ethnic group

Loma
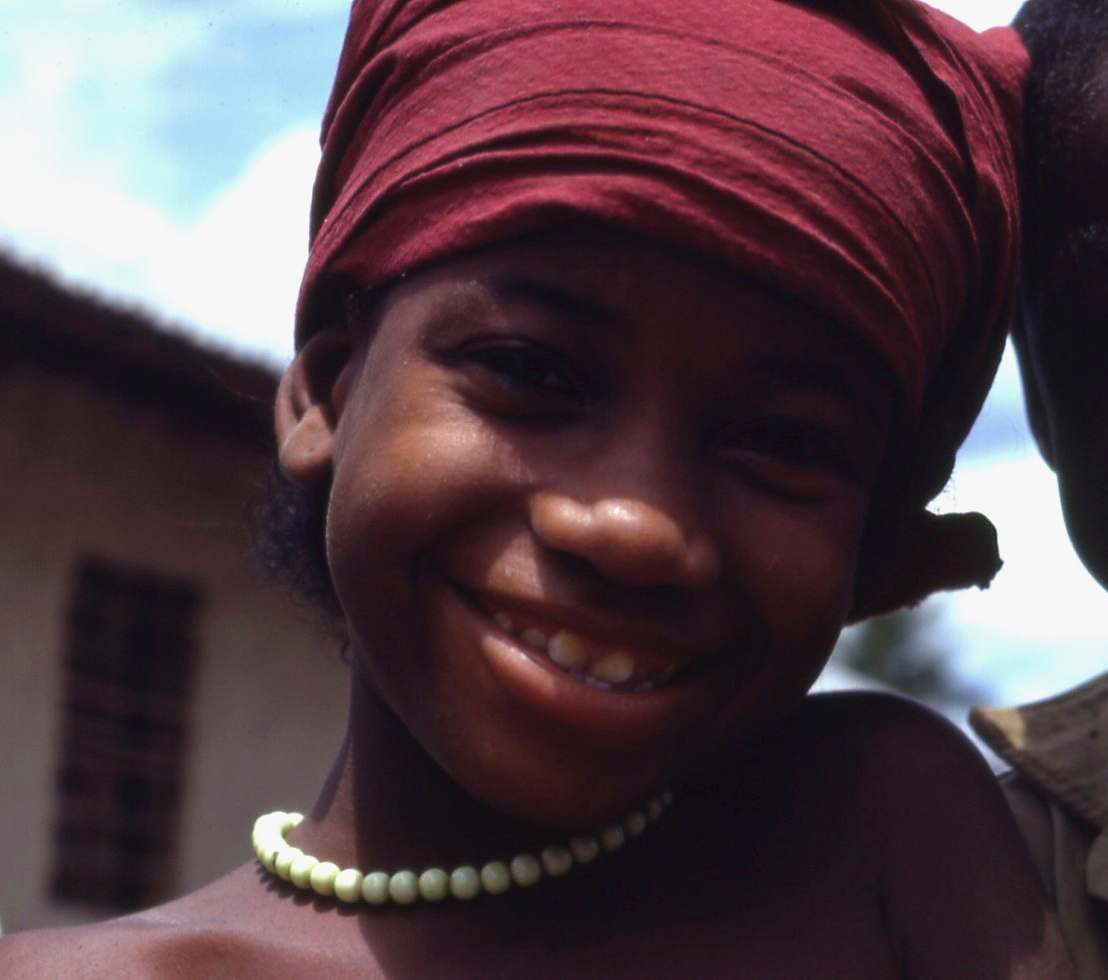

Total population
- 309,000

Regions with significant populations
- Guinea: 144,000
- Liberia: 165,000

Languages
- Loma, French, English

Religion
- Traditional, Christianity, Islam

Related ethnic groups
- Mende people, Kpelle people, Kissi people, Mano people, Vai people, Kono people, Gbandi people

The Loma people, sometimes called Loghoma, Looma, Lorma or Toma, are a West African ethnic group living primarily in mountainous, sparsely populated regions near the border between Guinea and Liberia. Their population was estimated at 330,000 in the two countries in 2010. They are closely related to the Mende people.

The Loma speak a language in the Southwestern branch of the Mande languages, belonging to the Niger-Congo family of languages. The language is similar to the Kpelle, Mende, Vai, and Bandi languages. The Loma refer to their language as Löömàgòòi [lɔːmàɡòːi], or Löghömàgòòi [lɔɣɔmàɡòːi] in Guinea. They refer to themselves as Löömàgìtì Loma pronunciation: [lɔːmàɡìtì], or Löghömagiti [lɔɣɔmaɡiti] in Guinea. The Loma people, led by Wido Zobo and assisted by a Loma weaver named Moriba, developed a writing script for their language in the 1930s. This writing script contains at least 185 characters.

The Mandinka, Koniaka, and Kissi refer to the Loma as Toma. The Loma have retained their traditional religion, and resisted the Islamic incursion. The Loma people called the religious conflict with Mandinka people a historic 'rolling war'.

The Loma people are notable for their large wooden masks that merge syncretic animal and human motifs. These masks have been a part of their Poro secret rites of passage. The largest masks are about six feet high, contain feather decorations and believed by Loma to have forest spirits.

The Loma people farm rice, but in shifting farms. They are exogamous people, with patrilineal social organization in matters related to inheritance, succession and lineage affiliations with one-marriage rule. Joint families, or virilocal communities are common, wherein families of brothers settle close to each other.

The Loma people are also referred to as Buzi, Buzzi, Logoma, Toale, Toali, Toa, or Tooma.

== Loma patronyms ==
Loma surnames	Bamavogui; Bassingui; Bavogui (Gbavogui); Béavogui; Billivogui; Bolivogui; Dopagui; Dopavogui; Falivogui; Foniwogui; Grovogui; Guilavogui; Goépogui; Golovogui; Gouavogui; Honivogui; Inapogui; Kalivogui; Kebawogui; Koévogui; Koivogui; Koropogui; Kovogui; Kovoigui; Koyavogui; Kpakpavogui; Lenogui; Monpagui; Nikavogui; Oivogui; Onépogui; Onipogui; Onivogui; Pamavogui; Papavogui; Poévogui; Povogui; Sakouvogui; Sakovogui; Sampogui; Savogui; Sedepogui; Sevogui; Sivogui; Soivogui; Solopogui; Solovogui; Somopogui; Soropogui; Sorovogui; Sovogui; Sovoïgui; Sowogui; Sympogui (Simpogui); Toulouvogui; Toupouvogui; Zoumanigui

== Notable Loma people ==
- Louis Lansana Béavogui, former prime minister of Guinea from 1972 to 1984
- Joshua Guilavogui, French footballer
- K. Guilavogui, Guinean politician
- Michel Guilavogui, Guinean footballer
- Mohamed Guilavogui, Malian footballer
- Morgan Guilavogui, French footballer
- Pépé Guilavogui, Guinean footballer
- Balla Onivogui, Guinean trumpet player
